= The Wedding of Smailagić Meho =

Bosniak oral epic poem

The Wedding of Smailagić Meho (Serbo-Croatian: Ženidba Smailagić Meha; also translated as The Wedding of Meho, Son of Smail) is a South Slavic oral epic poem of the Bosniak epic tradition. It recounts the coming of age of the frontier hero Meho Smailagić, who leaves the Ottoman border fortress of Kanjiža to obtain official investiture as a military leader in Buda and to secure his marriage, overcoming ambush, treachery and a large scale battle on the Ottoman–Habsburg frontier.

The most famous version of the poem was dictated between 5 and 12 July 1935 by the guslar Avdo Međedović to collectors Milman Parry and Albert Lord in Bijelo Polje. This text, preserved as Parry Collection no. 6840, consists of 12,311 decasyllabic lines and is one of the longest recorded epics in the Serbo-Croatian oral tradition. It has been discussed in scholarship on the oral-formulaic theory of composition.

== Background and textual history ==
=== Early recordings ===
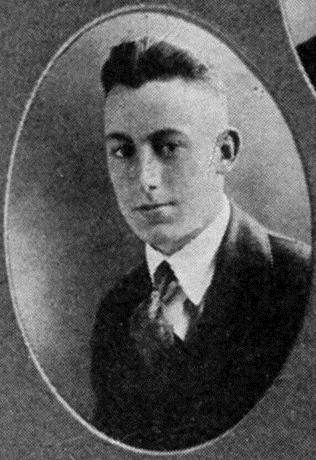
Milman Parry

The story of Meho Smailagić circulated in oral tradition before being recorded in writing. An early collected text was taken down in 1885 by the Austrian ethnographer Friedrich S. Krauss from the singer Ahmed Isakov Šemić in the village of Rotimlja (near the confluence of the Buna and Neretva rivers). Krauss published the Bosnian text with a German translation in Vienna in 1890 as Mehmeds Brautfahrt. Ein Volksepos der südslavischen Muhammedaner.

Krauss’s published version (about 2,160 lines) presents the narrative framework in a compressed form compared with later recorded performances, and later discussion of Međedović’s poem often uses it as a point of comparison for expansion and variation within the tradition.

=== Parry–Lord fieldwork and Avdo Međedović ===
In the early 1930s the American classicist Milman Parry undertook fieldwork among South Slavic epic singers as part of his investigation into the oral background of Homeric poetry.

Parry conducted two principal expeditions (1933; and June 1934 to September 1935) and worked in locations including Novi Pazar, Bijelo Polje, Kolašin, Gacko, Stolac and the Bosnian Krajina. The resulting archive is preserved as the Milman Parry Collection of Oral Literature.

The collection preserves both sung performances accompanied by the gusle and dictated texts produced under fieldwork conditions.

Parry’s recording apparatus used two turntables so that discs could be changed in sequence and long performances could be documented without breaks despite the short duration of individual disc sides.

A singer who became especially important for later scholarship was Avdo Međedović from Obrov near Bijelo Polje. Albert Lord treated Međedović as a particularly informative performer for studying the composition of long narrative songs within a living oral tradition and for comparing how narrative scale and detail could vary across performances and recording circumstances. Lord later returned to the region in 1950–1951 and recorded additional material from singers connected with Parry’s earlier fieldwork.

=== Dictation of the 1935 text and publication ===
At Parry’s request, Međedović dictated The Wedding of Smailagić Meho in July 1935. Accounts of the poem’s transmission note that Međedović learned the basic narrative outline from a printed version read aloud to him and then developed the story using the techniques and resources of the oral epic tradition. The dictated text preserved as Parry Collection no. 6840 runs to 12,311 lines.

The 1935 dictated text was later published with an English translation and scholarly apparatus as volume 3 of Serbocroatian Heroic Songs, edited and translated by Albert B. Lord and David E. Bynum.

=== Editions and translations ===
In addition to the Harvard edition and translation, the poem has appeared in several later South Slavic editions intended for regional readerships, including the Sarajevo edition published by Svjetlost with an extended introductory study by Enes Kujundžić. This edition situates Međedović’s dictated version within the Bosniak epic tradition and provides contextual discussion of its narrative structure, themes, and stylistic features.

The poem has also been published in Bosnian-language editions by El-Kelimeh, which present the text for contemporary readers and educational use within Bosnia and Herzegovina and the Sandžak region, generally without extensive critical notations.

== Synopsis ==
The poem begins with a brief invocation and then shifts to the Ottoman frontier fortress of Kanjiža, where Bosnian border captains and warriors convene in an assembly under Hasan-paša Tiro. The gathering includes accounts of earlier raids, duels, and frontier warfare. Meho Smailagić, the only son of Smail-aga, the pilgrim, remains silent and is questioned about his mood. He states that he lacks neither wealth nor equipment, but that he has been denied the opportunity to lead men or prove himself publicly, leaving him without the status expected of his position. In anger he threatens to defect to the frontier enemy, General Petar of Karabogdan (Moldavia), and to fight against his own side. The leaders respond by confirming that Meho will succeed to the family office of alajbey and instruct him to travel to Buda (Budim) to obtain formal confirmation from the vizier.

Meho is prepared for the journey by his household. His mother dresses him in ceremonial clothing and arms him for travel, and he departs with his experienced standard-bearer, Osman-bajraktar. On the road they pause at the home of a local Christian notable who receives them hospitably but warns Meho not to place trust in imperial officials. As Meho approaches Buda, he encounters an escorted carriage and hears distress from within. He confronts the escort commander, kills him during the dispute, and fights the escort troops with Osman. In the carriage Meho discovers Fatima, the daughter of the Budim noble Zaim Ali-beg. Fatima explains that she is being taken against her will to General Petar and that the arrangement was ordered by the vizier of Buda as part of an alliance directed against Bosnian frontier interests. She further reports that her father has been dispossessed and exiled to Baghdad.

Meho escorts Fatima to her household in Buda, where her mother receives her after believing her lost. Meho then appears before the vizier to obtain confirmation of his alajbey appointment. The vizier grants the investiture but continues to act in ways that Meho interprets as hostile and obstructive. Meho also seeks a marriage certificate (nikahnama) through the court, where the presiding judge refuses cooperation until Meho threatens force. Meho and Fatima are formally betrothed, but Meho insists that he must return to Kanjiža to inform his family and to assemble a wedding party strong enough to travel safely and to confront any expected treachery.

Back at Kanjiža, Meho’s family and the frontier leadership prepare a large armed wedding procession (svatovi) that also functions as a military host. Messages are sent across Bosnia and the frontier regions to summon allies, including well known heroes from other epic songs, such as Mustay-bey of Lika and the Hrnjica brothers. Special effort is made to recruit Budalina Tale (Tale of Orašac), an unconventional fighter whose blunt speech and mercenary habits set him apart from the other captains. Supplies are also requisitioned from local dependents to support the host on the march.

The wedding host rides toward Buda. The vizier sends messages encouraging delay and extended feasting, which Tale treats as a tactic to buy time. During this period General Petar secures a key crossing at a bridge over the river Klima and destroys the Bosnian advance guard stationed there. When news reaches the main party in Buda, Tale takes a leading role in organising a response and directing the attack. The poem describes a prolonged battle at the bridge and on the surrounding heights, involving repeated assaults and heavy losses. Meho is portrayed as capturing General Petar alive, while the Bosnian leaders also seize the vizier and other officials associated with the plot. The captives are judged and executed, and the vizier’s accumulated wealth is seized.

After the fighting, the Bosnian leaders send a petition to the sultan describing the vizier’s abuses and the circumstances of the conflict. The poem presents the sultan as approving the frontier leaders’ actions and authorising a replacement appointment. A new vizier is installed in Buda from among those connected to Fatima’s family, and the sultan also orders a search for the exiled nobles in Baghdad. Fatima’s father is located, restored, and returned. The epic ends with Meho and Fatima’s completed marriage and the return of the wedding party to Kanjiža, followed by extended celebrations and a closing prayer.

== Historical and geographical background ==
The poem’s setting reflects the Ottoman–Habsburg frontier zone in Central Europe, with locations, offices, and conflicts presented through the conventions of South Slavic frontier epic rather than as a strictly documentary account. Place names and titles correspond to historical administrative and military centres of Ottoman Hungary, but they function primarily as narrative anchors within a borderland world characterised by warfare, raiding, negotiation, and shifting authority.

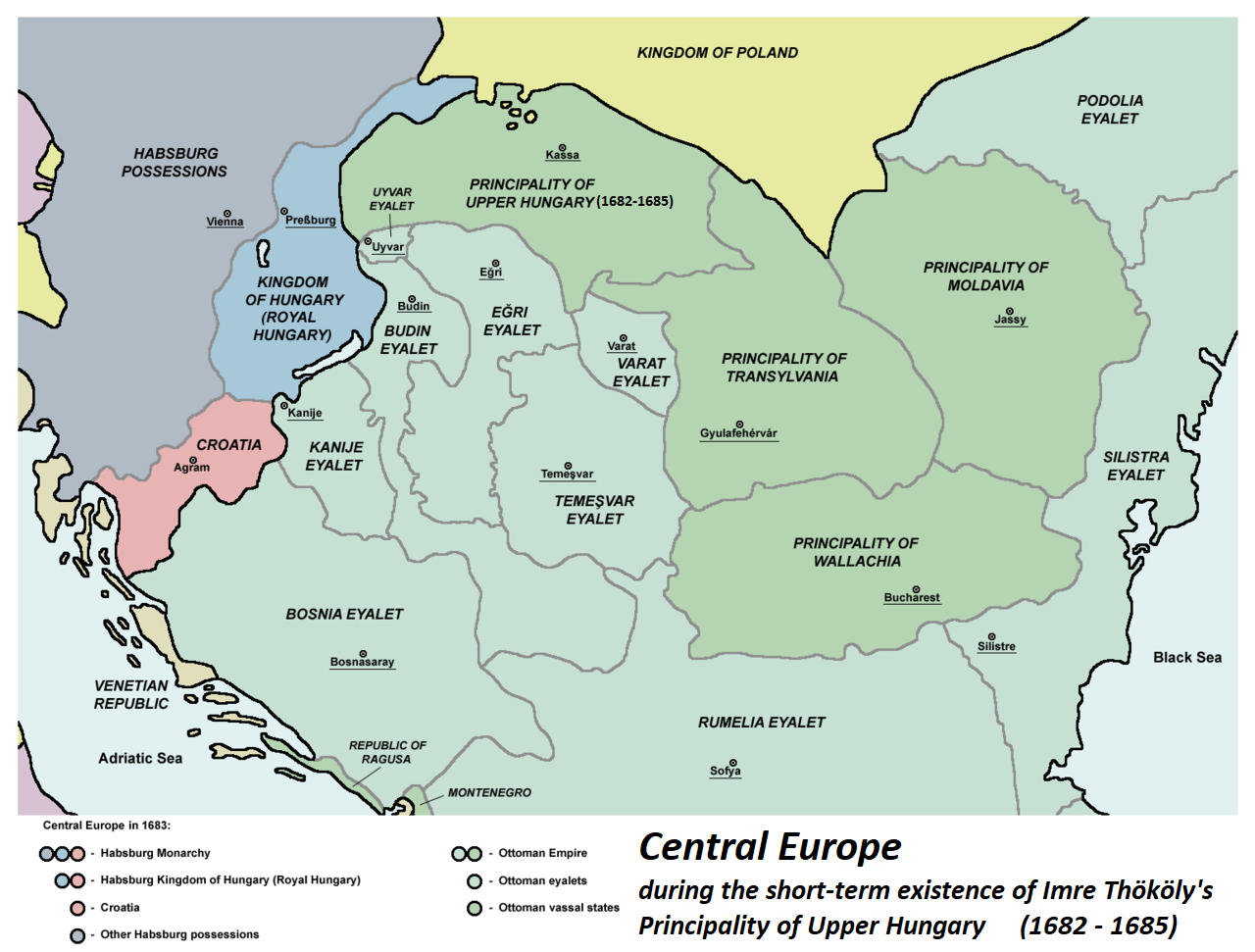
Ottoman rule in Hungary at its greatest territorial extent in 1683. The poem reflects conditions associated with the Ottoman–Habsburg frontier during the seventeenth century.

In the poem, Kanjiža is presented as a border fortress and gathering place for frontier captains. The name corresponds to Nagykanizsa (Ottoman Kanije/Kanizsa), a strategically important stronghold in southwestern Hungary that became a focal point of Ottoman frontier defence following its capture in 1600. In early modern historical sources, Kanizsa is closely associated with Tiryaki Hasan Paşa and the successful Ottoman defence of the fortress during the Habsburg siege of 1601.

Buda (Budim) appears in the poem as the seat of a vizier and as a centre where official documents, judicial decisions, and marriage arrangements are secured. Historically, Buda was held by the Ottomans from 1541 until 1686 and served as the capital of the Budin province (eyalet), functioning as a major administrative, judicial, and military hub in Ottoman Hungary.

The social world depicted in the poem is organised around armed households, frontier captains, and collective assemblies, and it repeatedly represents wedding processions as armed escorts. Such depictions correspond to broader patterns observed in Ottoman borderlands, where military service, mobility, and local organisation played a central role in maintaining security and authority alongside imperial institutions.

From the perspective of regional history, the poem reflects conditions associated with Bosnia’s position within the Ottoman frontier system. From the sixteenth century onward, Bosnia functioned as a major frontier province in the empire’s western military organisation and as a recruitment and supply zone for garrisons and campaigns in adjacent theatres. Population movements accompanying warfare and later Ottoman territorial contraction in Central Europe are one context in which frontier-themed narratives circulated and were re-performed in different local settings within the South Slavic epic tradition.

Although the poem employs recognisable place names and Ottoman administrative titles (such as vizier and alajbey), its individual antagonists and political alignments are shaped by epic convention rather than by precise historical correspondence. Characters such as “General Petar of Karabogdan” function as standardised frontier adversaries associated with Moldavia (Karabogdan) within the epic tradition and should not be interpreted as straightforward representations of specific historical commanders.

== Poetic form and themes ==
The Wedding of Smailagić Meho is composed in the decasyllabic line (deseterac) typical of South Slavic heroic epic, commonly described with a regular caesura after the fourth syllable. Performances in the tradition are associated with sung delivery accompanied by the one-stringed fiddle (gusle), while fieldwork in the Parry Collection also documented dictated versions produced for transcription under research conditions.

The poem’s diction and narrative movement rely on repeated epithets, formulaic phrasing, and recurring thematic units associated with oral composition. Scholarship on oral-formulaic composition has used South Slavic material, including Međedović’s long dictated texts and sung performances, to describe how singers can maintain narrative continuity while extending episodes such as assemblies, journeys, catalogue-like invitations, and battle sequences.

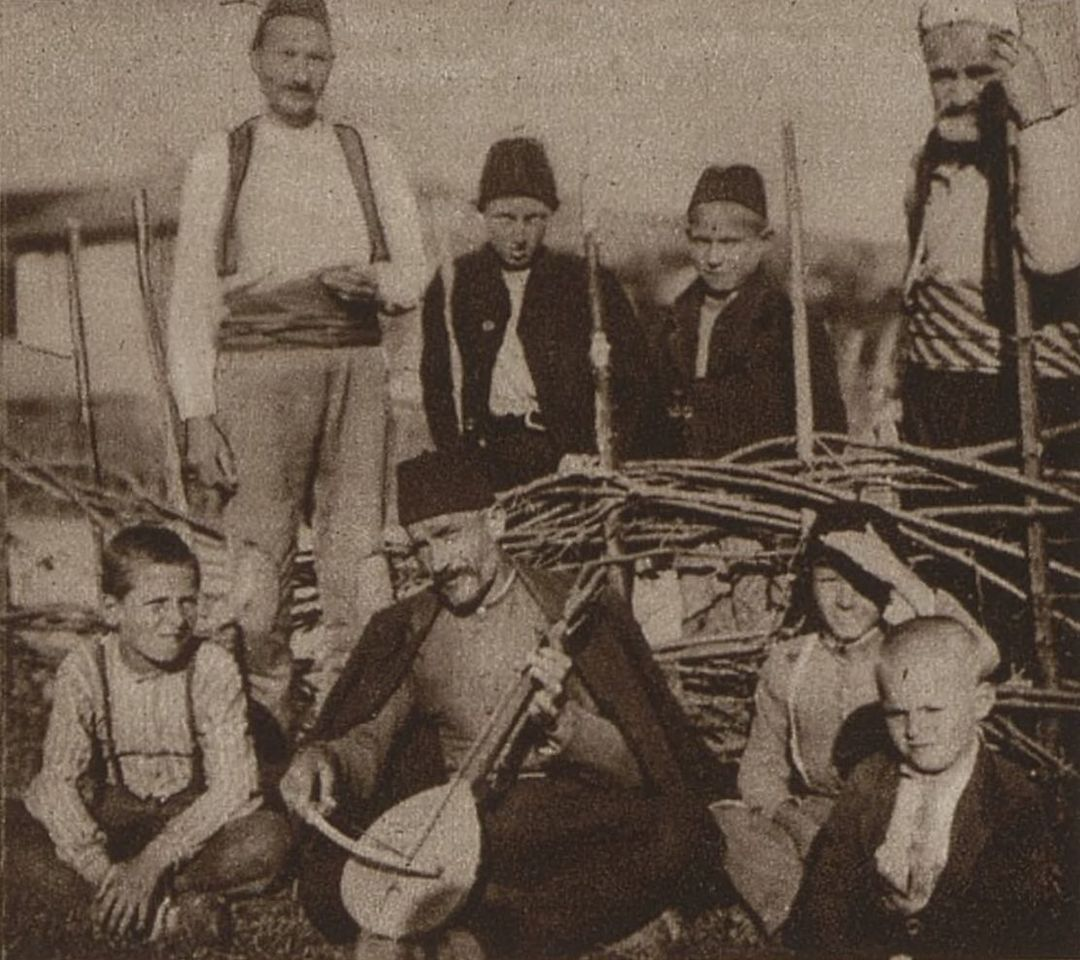
A Bosnian playing the gusle. Epic poetry was often sung to the accompaniment of the Gusle or Šargija.

In thematic terms, the poem combines an initiation narrative centred on a young, untested hero with depictions of frontier politics and collective decision-making on the Ottoman border. It places particular emphasis on honour and reputation, the negotiation of authority within a household, and the way marriage alliances intersect with political conflict.

A further recurring focus in discussion of the poem is Budalina Tale (Tale of Orašac), who combines comic effect with practical influence on the plot. His blunt speech, unconventional appearance, and sceptical attitude toward official assurances contrast with more formal heroic behaviour, while his interventions are presented as instrumental in recognising danger and directing collective action at moments of crisis.

== Reception ==
The poem has been cited in scholarship on South Slavic oral epic in connection with questions of oral composition, performance, and the documentation of long narrative songs through twentieth-century field recording, including the relationship between recorded performance, dictation, transcription and publication.

Because Parry’s initial interest in South Slavic epic was linked to his research on Homeric poetry, the poem and its documentation have also been referred to in comparative work that uses the South Slavic evidence as a point of reference for debates about oral tradition in ancient epic.

Within regional literary scholarship, The Wedding of Smailagić Meho is commonly treated as part of a Bosniak frontier epic repertoire associated with the Ottoman–Habsburg borderlands and is discussed alongside other songs and cycles that share characters, settings and narrative conventions of the Krajina epic tradition.

== See also ==
- Avdo Međedović
- Bosniak epic poetry
- Milman Parry
- Albert Lord
- Oral-formulaic composition
