= Bosniak epic poetry =

Form of epic poetry created by Bosniaks

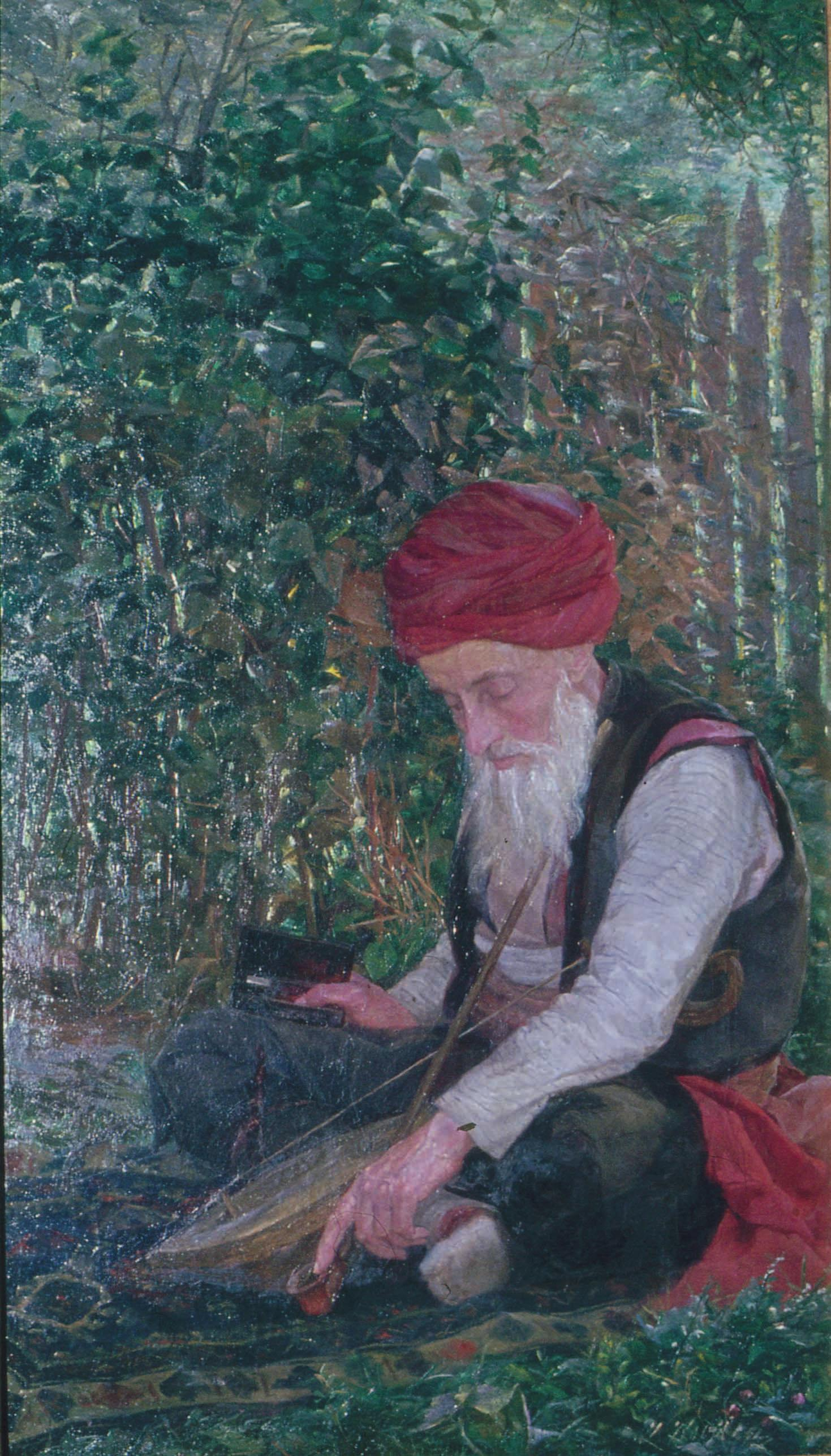
Ivana Kobilca - Bošnjak z Goslimi "Bosniak with the Gusle" 1900

Bosniak epic poetry (Bosnian: Bošnjačke epske narodne pjesme) is a form of epic poetry originating in today's Bosnia and Herzegovina and in the Sandžak region, which is a part of modern-day Serbia and Montenegro. Bosniak epic poetry developed during the Ottoman period. Historically, they were accompanied by the Gusle. The theory of oral-formulaic composition was developed also through the scholarly study of Bosnian epic verse.

== History ==
The first records of Bosniak epic songs, discovered and dated so far, come from the first decades of the 18th century. However, there is information about Bosniak epics from the end of the 15th to the end of the 17th century, which were hidden for a long time in little-known travelogues, manuscripts of various profiles, chronicles, and war reports.

The Slovene Benedikt Kuripečić brought the earliest attestation about Bosniak oral epic poetry. The attestation originates from the year 1530, when Kuripečić, as a member of the Austrian embassy, on his way to Constantinople, passed through Bosnia and, near the walls of a small town called "Japra" together with other members of the embassy met the subaša Malkosthitz (Malkošić) accompanied by his 50 armed horsemen. "They sing a lot about his heroid ceeds in Croatia and Bosnia," says Kuripečić. Kuripečić's data explicitly states that the songs of the Bosniaks are created and shaped simultaneously with the poetry of other confessional groups in the neighbouring South Slavic areas. It is certainly a rarity in the epic tradition of the Slavs that a person enters epic tradition while they're still alive. Toma Maretić accounts in a mention of South Slavic folk songs "The first absolutely certain" evidence for Bosniak epic poetry in the 16th century. The Ottomanist Hazim Šabanović later verified that the subaša of Kamengrad from 1530 was Malkošić - Malkoč Bey, buried in Banja Luka, and that he had the personal name Malkoč. The inhabitants of the Croatian frontier called him "the most fiery Bosnian beg" which corresponds to what Kuripečić recorded about him.

Slavic songs from the Ottoman era played a strong, inciting and artistic role in the Ottoman army, which included a significant proportion of Bosniaks. Evidence of this was left by the Hungarian writer Sebestyén Tinódi, an eyewitness and participant in the Ottoman-Hungarian battles, which he described in his chronicle in verse, which was published with the title in Latin (Chronica) in Kolozsvar, 1554.

=== Milman Parry and Albert Lord ===
Modern field studies of oral epics in the former Yugoslavia, organized by the American classicist Milman Parry in the period from 1932 to 1934 (in parts of Bosnia and Herzegovina, Sandžak and Montenegro), will establish the largest collection of South Slavic oral epics, and its most significant part consists of Bosniak epics. Helping Milman Parry, his student Albert B. Lord gained experience and love for further research on oral South Slavic epics, which was of crucial importance in deciding to continue collecting South Slavic poetry after Parry's death, again predominantly Bosniak. Albert Lord will return to the Balkans in the years 1935, 1937, 1950, 1951, and in the period between 1960 and 1965.

The entire collection is preserved in the "Parry Collection" at Harvard University's Library. The epic forms the core of this collection, in which there are over 1,000 epic poems.

A significant part of the South Slavic collection has been published, including many Bosniak epics in the "Serbian-Croatian Heroic Songs" edition. The first book consists of songs by singers from Novi Pazar: Salih Ugljanin (fourteen songs), Sulejman Fortić (one song), Džemal Zogić (one song), Sulejman Makić (two songs) and Alija Fjuljanin (three songs). Except for Sulejman Fortić, they were all Albanians, and among them Salih Ugljanin and Džemal Zogić were able to translate songs from Albanian into Bosnian, while Sulejman Makić and Alija Fjuljanin were able to sing only in Bosnian.

=== Avdo Međedović ===
Avdo Međedović was a guslar from Bijelo Polje in Sandžak (1875-1955). The researchers, Milman Parry and Albert Lord were led to him after visiting a local kafana and asking for guslars. The researchers were astonished by Avdo and his ability to recite poetry; he was the most skillful performer that they encountered in their voyages through the Balkans. Lord writes that Avdo had a repertoire of fifty-eight epics. Parry recorded nine of these on phonograph discs, and Nikola Vujnović, the translator, wrote down four others from Avdo's dictation.

Most of Avdo's songs had an origin in the Krajina region. As can be concluded by the main characters in his songs being semi-historical figures from the Krajina region. Despite the geographic distance between Avdo and Bosnia Albert Lord states that he in his songs would pride himself of the times when Bosnia was "the lock and the golden key" of the Ottoman Empire. To Avdo, this greatness was in the moral fiber and loyal dedication of the Bosnian heroes.

The most impressive song was "The Wedding of Smailagić Meho" (Ženidba Smailagić Meha). This song had been written down by F. S Krauss in 1885, by a Muslim singer from Rotimlje in Herzegovina, later published in Dubrovnik and reprinted in Sarajevo in 1886. Avdo claims that a friend of his had read the song from a published source 5 or 6 times, then followed his memorization of the text. Despite this, Avdo's oral version is very different from the original published one, and much more descriptive:

In the case of two of Avdo's songs, "The wedding of Meho, Son of Smail" and "Bećiragić Meho", we had the exact original from which Avdo had learned them and we knew the circumstances under which he acquired them. A friend of his had read "The Wedding of Meho" to him five or six times from a published version. It had been written down in 1885 by F. S. Krauss from an eighty-five year old singer in Rotimlje, Hercegovina, named Ahmed Isakov Šemić, and had been published in Dubrovnik in 1886. It was later reprinted, with minor changes in dialect, in cheap paper editions in Sarajevo, without notes and introduction. In this form it was read to Avdo. Krauss' text has 2,160 lines; Avdo's in 1935 had 12,323 lines and in 1950, 8,488 lines

This song has its origin in the Krajina region. As a majority of the characters are from Krajina, Slavonia and Hungary. The historical setting of the song is in Ottoman ruled Hungary, following Meho, son of Smailaga on his journey to Buda.

Avdo learned from many men, firstly from his father Ćor Huso Husein of Kolašin "whose reputation seems to have been prodigious". Lord mentions that though Avdo had a great endurance and mastery as a poet, "his voice was not especially good. He was hoarse, and the goiter on the left side of his neck could not have helped." in 1935 Lord asked Međedović to recall a song he heard only once, for this he asked another guslar, Mumin Vlahovljak of Plevlje, to sing his song "Bećiragić Meho", unknown to Međedović. After he heard the song of 2,294 lines, he sung it himself, but made it almost three times longer, 6,313 lines.

==== Recorded by Parry in 1935 ====
- "The Death of Mustajbey of the Lika" (2,436 lines)
- "Hrnjica Mujo Avenges the Death of Mustajbey of the Lika" (6,290 lines)
- "The Wedding of Vlahinjić Alija" (Ženidba Vlahinjić Alije) (6,042 lines; "a dictated version of this song" is slightly different: 5,883 lines)
- "The Heroism of Đerđelez Alija" (Junaštvo Đerzelez Alije) (2,624 lines).
- "Osmanbey Delibegović and Pavičević Luka" (13,331 lines)
- "Sultan Selim Captures Kandija" (5,919 lines)
- "The Illness of Emperor Dušan in Prizren" (645 lines)
- "The Captivity of Kara Omeragha" (1,302 lines)
- "Bećiragić Meho" (6,313 lines)

Dictated in 1935

- "The Arrival of the Vizier in Travnik" (7,621 lines)
- "The Wedding of Meho, Son of Smail" (Ženidba Smailagić Meha) (12,311 lines)
- "Gavran Harambaša and Sirdar Mujo" (4,088 lines)
- "The Captivity of Tale of Orašac in Ozim" (3,738 lines, unfinished)

Recorded by Lord 1950–1951

- "Osmanbey Delilbegović and Pavičević Luka" (6,119 lines)
- "The Wedding of Meho, Son of Smail" (8,488 lines)
- "Bećiragić Meho" (3,561 lines)

== Classification ==
When looking at the differences between regions, Bosniak epic poetry can usually be divided into the following categories:

1. Songs about Central Bosnia and Krajina.
2. Songs about Bosnian-Hungarian events and heroes whose historical background can be traced to Hungary and Slavonia.
3. Songs of the Herzegovina-Montenegro region and area
4. Songs which originate in the Sandžak region
5. Muslim songs in the Albanian language, this concerns songs that have been transmitted by bilingual singers, either to, or from the Albanian milieu.

In addition to this type of spatial-historical classification, there is also a thematic-motive classification, they are usually categorized into six basic themes that are connected to certain motifs. These themes are:

1. The theme of raiding, looting and capture of women
2. The theme of captivity and the release of slaves
3. The theme of heroic marriages and weddings
4. The theme of duels between warriors
5. The theme of the defense and conquest of cities and fortresses
6. The theme of revenge

=== By region ===
The entire Bosniak epic can be differentiated into two different groups, the first being Bosniak epic that originates in the area of Western and Northwestern Bosnia, often called "Krajiška/Krajinska epika" (Frontier Epic). This includes the aforementioned songs about Central Bosnia and Krajina, and the songs about whose origins lie in Hungary and Slavonia.

The other group being Bosniak epic that originates in Herzegovina and Eastern Bosnia. This includes songs of the Herzegovina-Montenegro area, and the Sandžak region that was in the same administrative unit as Herzegovina for most of the Ottoman rule over Bosnia and Herzegovina.

==== Krajina Epic ====
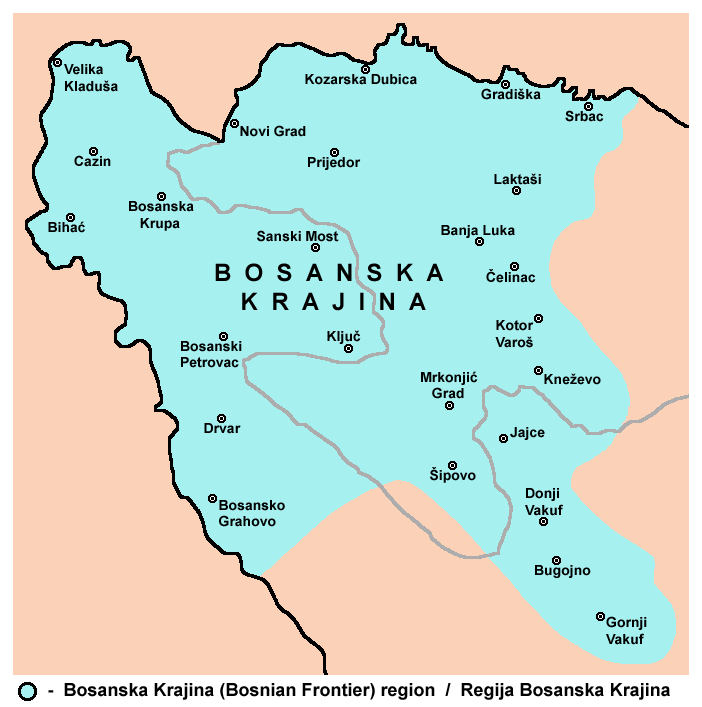
Bosnian Krajina

The characteristics of Krajina epic can be defined as following:

1. The content is related to warring in Krajina between the seventeenth and eighteenth centuries - most of the songs have some historical foundation since they sing about existing people and actual events
2. A depiction of real life on the borders of Bosnia, a frontier situated between the Ottoman and Habsburg empires
3. Most of the recorded songs contain more than one theme
4. The epic song is often very complicated, and parallel events being sung are common
5. There is a realistic element to many of the songs
6. A very small, almost negligible, number of fantastic elements
7. Longer epic songs that contain a large amount of verses
8. Epic narratives and digressions
9. More commonly sung with a tambura and šargija than gusle

==== Herzegovina Epic ====
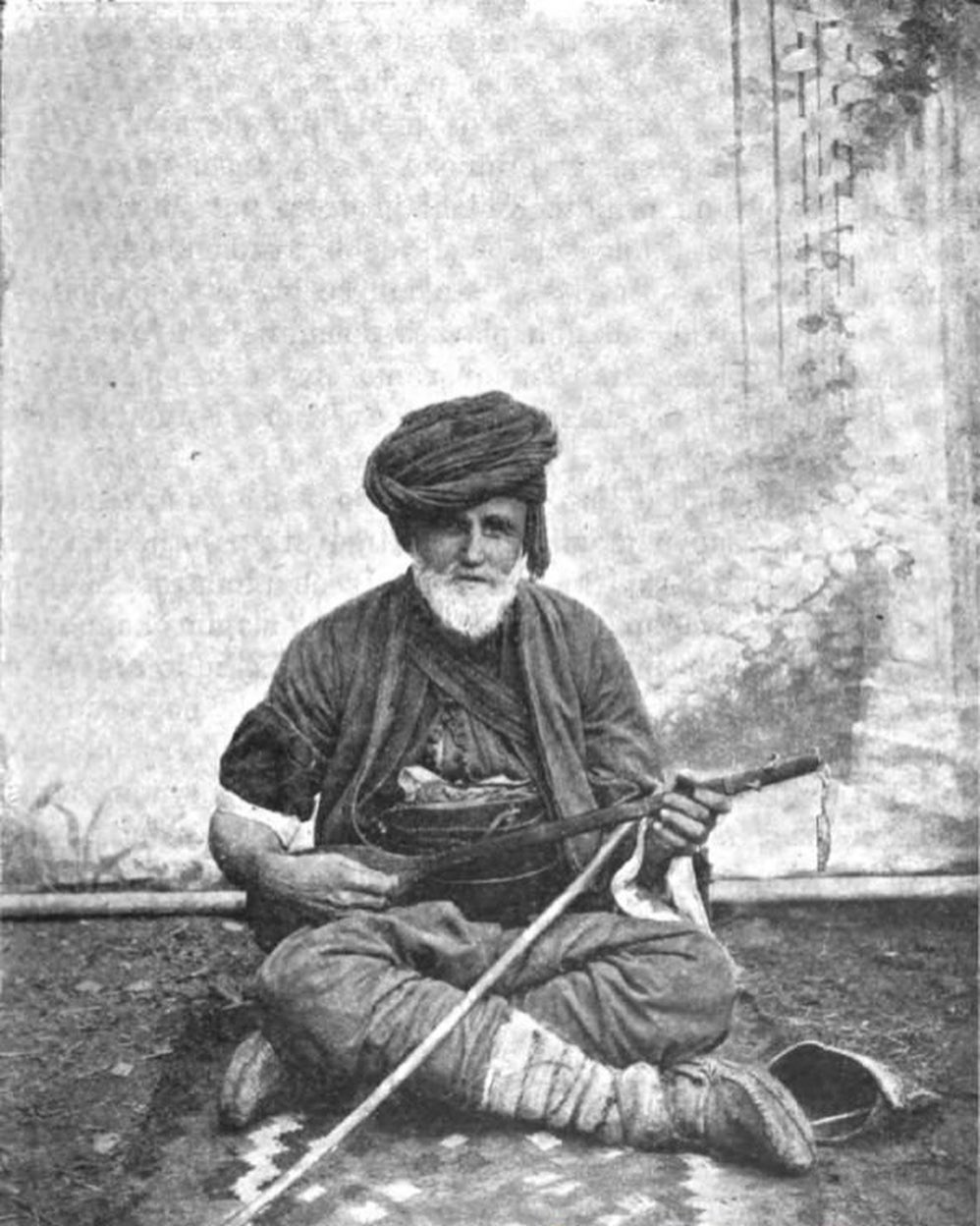
1. Singer of epics using the šargija/tambura
  In most cases, the heroes are borrowed from Krajina.
2. Archaic (mythological) elements are more common
3. Usually only one theme is sung
4. Plot is concise
5. Dialogues are common
6. Shorter epic songs (usually around 300 verses)
7. Sung exclusively with the gusle

== Characteristics ==
Bosniak epic poetry, just like epic poetry belonging to other people contains mention of heroic and extraordinary deeds done by characters that can be described by the same terms. An often occurrence among the most popular figures such as Đerzelez is that they challenge foes to duels (mejdane).

There is also a pre-Islamic element that can be found in Bosniak epic poetry. It is not rare for a fairy (vila) to heal or guide the epic figure through his journeys. This is a trait that Bosniak folk poetry shares with other South Slavic and Slavic national poetries. A good example of this would be the poem "The Mountain Fairies Heal Mujo Hrnjica" (Muja liječe vile planinkinje) where the mountain fairies heal the wounded hero Mujo and help him return home.

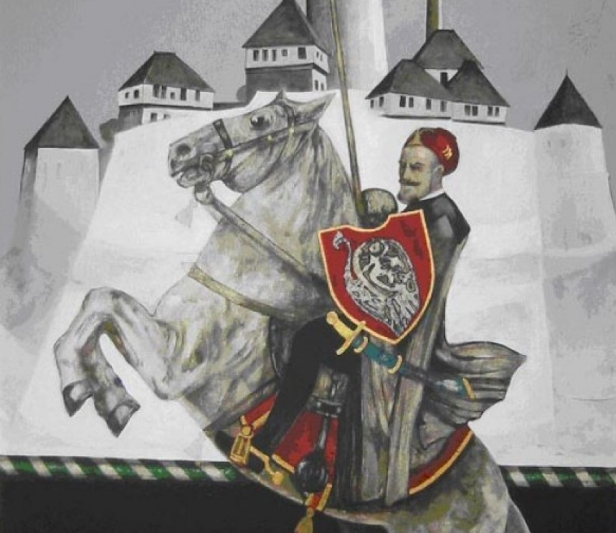
Illustration of Mujo Hrnjica

Except for the fairies being helpful in times of need, there is also an oral tradition in the Krajina region that is connected to the birth of Mujo and Halil Hrnjica. It says that "the mountain fairy nursed them with her milk, from which Mujo received great strength and heroism, and Halil with morning dew, from which he received great beauty." According to tradition, the mountain fairy defended the Kladuša tower and town against the attacks of the invaders along with the inhabitants of Krajina, and thus the mythological being of the fairy stayed with the people. Today the old town is called "Vilinski" (Fairy Town).

Folk tales among Krajina singers used to tell of a romantic legend where the originator of all heroic epic from Krajina is a mysterious beauty (most likely a fairy) known as "Ajka Blidolika", a girl from Udbina, it is claimed that she gave the book of songs (Pjesmarica) to someone who spread the songs. The Croat ethnographer Luka Marjanović even embarked on an unsuccessful search for a mysterious book written in Turkish, which was rumored to be in the possession of Bey Beširević from Ostrožac.

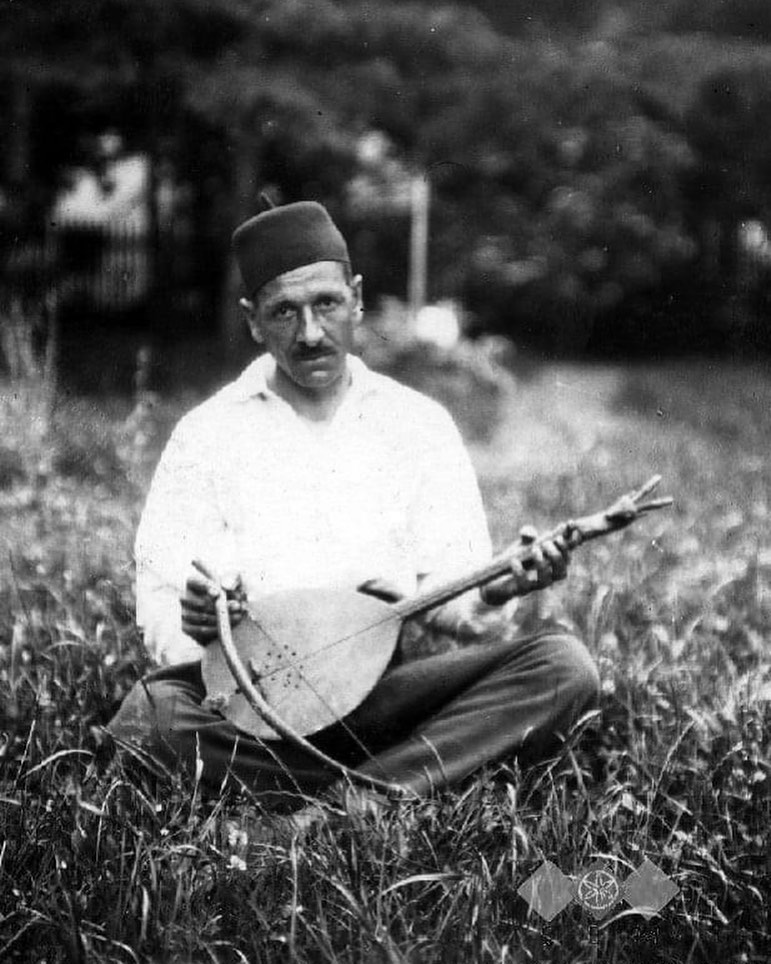
Guslar from Tuzla

=== Gusle ===
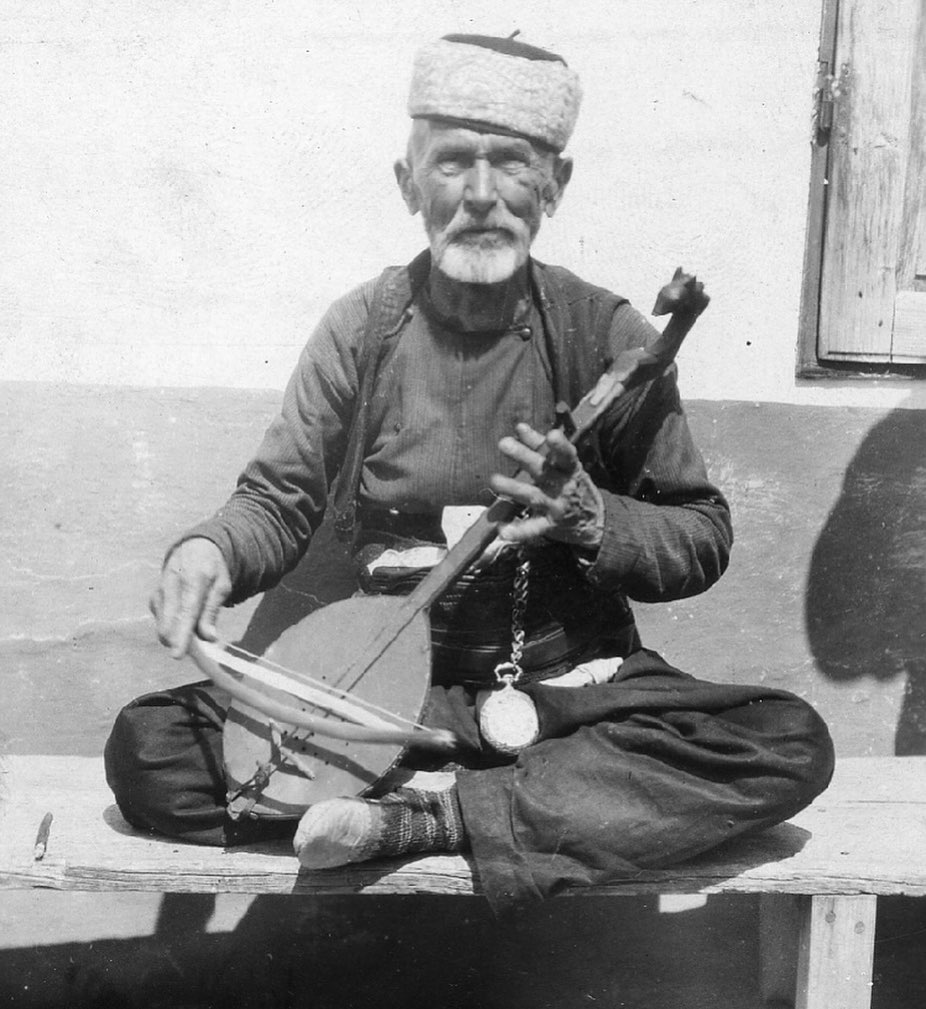
Guslar from Nova Varoš

Bosniak epic poetry, just like the epic poetry of other Southern Slavs, was accompanied by the Gusle (Lahuta in Albanian). Kosta Hörmann mentions in his collections of epics from the territory of Bosnia and Herzegovina during Austro-Hungarian times that he "recognized joy when his Muslim hosts got lost in Gusle made from maple, after which a sonorous howl came from the singer's ringing throat. Songs about heroism and good horses". Milman Parry and Albert Lord also recorded many epic songs that were accompanied by the Gusle in their journeys through Bosnia, Herzegovina, and Montenegro.

== Notable characters and events ==
=== Notable characters ===
- Đerzelez Alija, legendary figure also found in the epic poetry of Kosovo and Northern Albania. A symbol of brotherly loyalty, he is known as "Gjergj Elez Alia" in Albanian and "Gerz Ilyas" in Hungarian. Popular throughout all of Bosnia, he was most popular in the Bosnian Krajina region.
- The Hrnjica Brothers, three brothers named Mujo, Halil and Omer, epic poetry also mentions their beautiful sister Ajkuna. Mujo is mentioned in 69 Songs, while Halil is mentioned in 63.
- Mustay-Bey of Lika, captain of Udbina and Sandzakbey of Lika. Totally mentioned in 63 Songs.
- Budalina Tale, translated as "Tale the Fool" in Bosnian. Mentioned in 67 songs.
- Gazi Husrev Bey, governor of the Bosnian Sandzak.
- Prince Marko, Serbian epic poetry figure, also mentioned in Bosniak epic poetry. Notably in "Đerzelez Alija and Prince Marko" (Đerzelez Alija i Kraljević Marko). In this tale, Marko considers Đerzelez to be an equally skilled warrior and his bloodbrothers
- Arnaut Osman, shared epic hero between Bosniak, Serb and Albanian epic poetry
- Vuk the Dragon-Despot, shared epic figure with Serbian poetry, most notably seen in "Đerzelez Alija and Vuk Jajčanin" (Đerzelez Alija i Vuk Jajčanin)
- Sibinjanin Janko, most notably mentioned in "Đerzelez Alija and the tsar of Stambol" (Gjerzelez Alija i Car od Stambola) where a duel between Sibinjanin Janko and Alija Đerzelez occurs
- Köprülüzade Fazıl Ahmed Pasha, Ottoman Vezir, most notably from the epic poem "Coming of vezir Ćuprilić in Travnik" (Dolazak bosanskog vezira Ćuprilića u Travnik)
- Filip Madžarin, Italian General Pippo Spano, rendered as "Filip the Hungarian" (Filip Madžarin) in South Slavic epic poetry

=== Notable events ===
- Siege of Szigetvár (Boj kod Sigeta)
- Siege of Nagykanizsa (Boj kod Kaniže)
- Battle at Osijek (Boj kod Osijeka)
- Conflict between Turkey and Russia (Ratovanje između Turske i Rusije)
- Building of the bridge in Višegrad (Zidanje ćuprije u Višegradu)
- The song of Baghdad (Pjesma Bagdata)

== See also ==
- The Wedding of Smailagić Meho
- Gusle
- List of national poetries
- Đerzelez Alija
- Culture of Bosnia and Herzegovina
- Bosniaks
- History of Bosniaks
