= Oral-formulaic theory in Anglo-Saxon poetry =

Oral-formulaic theory in Anglo-Saxon poetry refers to the application of the hypotheses of Milman Parry and Albert Lord on the Homeric Question to verse written in Old English. The theory proposes that features of at least some of the poetry may be explained by positing oral-formulaic composition, meaning that poets have a store of verbal formulae which they freely recombine to form poems. While Anglo-Saxon (Old English) epic poetry may bear some resemblance to Ancient Greek epics such as the Iliad and Odyssey, the question of if and how Anglo-Saxon poetry was passed down through an oral tradition remains a subject of debate, and the question for any particular poem unlikely to be answered with perfect certainty.

Parry and Lord had already demonstrated the density of metrical formulas in Ancient Greek. In Homeric verse, for example, a phrase like rhododaktylos eos ("rosy fingered dawn") or oinops pontos ("winedark sea") occupy a certain metrical pattern that fits, in modular fashion, into the six-colon Greek hexameter, and aid the aioidos or bard in extempore composition. Moreover, phrases of this type would be subject to internal substitutions and adaptations, permitting flexibility in response to narrative and grammatical needs: podas okus axilleus ("swift footed Achilles") is metrically equivalent to koruthaiolos ektor ("glancing-helmed Hektor"). Parry and Lord observed that the same phenomenon was apparent in the Old English alliterative line:

Hrothgar mathelode helm Scildinga ("Hrothgar spoke, protector of the Scildings")
Beowulf mathelode bearn Ecgtheowes ("Beowulf spoke, son of Ecgtheow")

and in the junacki deseterac (heroic decasyllable) of the demonstrably oral poetry of the Serbs:

a besjedi od Orasca Tale ("But spoke of Orashatz Tale")
a besjedi Mujagin Halile ("But spoke Mujo's Halil")

In Parry's view, formulas were not individual and idiosyncratic devices of particular artists, but the shared inheritance of a tradition of singers. They were easily remembered, making it possible for the singer to execute an improvisational composition-in-performance.

In addition to verbal formulas, many themes have been shown to appear among the various works of Anglo-Saxon literature. The theory proposes to explain this fact by suggesting that the poetry was composed of formulae and themes from a stock common to the poetic profession, as well as literary passages composed by individual artists in a more modern sense. Larry Benson introduced the concept of "written-formulaic" to describe the status of some Anglo-Saxon poetry which, while demonstrably written, contains evidence of oral influences, including heavy reliance on formulas and themes Frequent oral-formulaic themes in Old English poetry include "Beasts of Battle" and the "Cliff of Death". The former, for example, is characterized by the mention of ravens, eagles, and wolves preceding particularly violent depictions of battle. Among the most thoroughly documented themes is "The Hero on the Beach". D.K. Crowne first proposed this theme, defined by four characteristics:

A Hero on the Beach.
Accompanying "Retainers."
A Flashing Light.
The Completion or Initiation of a Journey.

One example Crowne cites in his article is that which concludes Beowulf's fight with the monsters during his swimming match with Breca:

Those sinful creatures had no fill of rejoicing that they consumed me, assembled at feast at the sea bottom; rather, in the morning, wounded by blades they lay up on the shore, put to sleep by swords, so that never after did they hinder sailors in their course on the sea. The light came from the east, the bright beacon of God.

Næs hie ðære fylle gefean hæfdon,
manfordædlan, þæt hie me þegon,
symbel ymbsæton sægrunde neah;
ac on mergenne mecum wunde
be yðlafe uppe lægon,
sweordum aswefede, þæt syðþan na
ymb brontne ford brimliðende
lade ne letton. Leoht eastan com,
beorht beacen godes;
Beowulf, lines 562–70a

Crowne drew on examples of the theme's appearance in twelve Anglo-Saxon texts, including one occurrence in Beowulf. It was also observed in other works of Germanic origin, Middle English poetry, and even an Icelandic prose saga. John Richardson held that the schema was so general as to apply to virtually any character at some point in the narrative, and thought it an instance of the "threshold" feature of Joseph Campbell's Hero's Journey monomyth. J. A. Dane, in an article characterized as "polemics without rigor" claimed that the appearance of the theme in Ancient Greek poetry, a tradition without known connection to the Germanic, invalidated the notion of "an autonomous theme in the baggage of an oral poet". Foley's response was that Dane misunderstood the nature of oral tradition, and that in fact the appearance of the theme in other cultures evidenced its traditional roots.
