= Vila (fairy) =

Female fairy beings of South and West Slavic folklore

Serbian epic heroes Prince Marko and Miloš Obilić, and the vila Ravijojla

A vila (Serbian: вила, plural: vile виле) or víla (Bulgarian: ви́ла, plural: víli ви́ли (Note: In Bulgarian also called samodiva (q.v.) alia diva, juda, samovila, samojuda.)), also: Czech: víla; (Note: In Czech also called samodiva, divoženka.) Old East Slavic: vila; Polish: wiła; Serbo-Croatian: vila; Slovak: víla; Slovene: vila; Macedonian: самовила is a Slavic fairy similar to a nymph.

== Nomenclature ==
The usage of the term vila in the sense of female demonic beings is known widely among South Slavs, from east (Bulgaria, Macedonia) to West (Slovenia), including Croatia, Montenegro,etc.

The vilă of Romanian folklore denotes a mythological figure similar to that of the South Slavs.

While the term "vila" is attested across various Slavic-speaking peoples, the term has become somewhat obsolete, having been superseded by "rusalki", in the opinion of Edmund Schneeweis. He considered the vila to be of manistic (ancestral worship) origin, i.e., originating from souls of girls who died prematurely. Similarly, the rusalki according to Russian folk belief are spirits arisen from unbaptized children or girls who committed suicide and thus refused proper Christian burial. (Note: Cf. Galkovsky (1916): "Не подлежитъ сомнѣнію, что южно-славянскія вилы соотвѣтствуютъ русскимъ русалкамъ [There is no doubt that the South Slavic vilas correspond to the Russian *rusalkas].")

Bulgarian tradition offers a rich records about the vila. Probably the oldest attestation occurs in documents of the Bulgarian Tsar Constantine Asen of the 13th century, which refers to the well of the vili.

=== West Slavic vila ===
Although the lexeme vila is known among the West Slavs, but in Slovakia, it has come to be applied to a rather different mythical being, similar or equivalent to the boginka. (Note: Plotnikova (2003), p. 228 citing ESSD [SDES] (1995) dictionary on "Boginka".)

Old Czech and Old Polish writings suggest that among the Western Slavs the vila was generally associated with something bad or sinful. Thus in Czech vila and Polish wila means "madman". (Note: In the Old Czech Chronicle of Dalimil vila is "fool".) In the past, vila has been recorded in Slovakia in the sense of a soul of bride who died before her wedding, or in Poland as the soul of a sinful woman who died and condemned to wander eternally between heaven and earth. (Note: Galkovsky (2000) [1916], and Plotnikova (2003), pp. 228–229 citing him.)

The vila (in the Southern Slavic sense of nature fairies or nymphs) is said to have been imported into West Slavic areas at a later stage. However, Niederle seeks evidence that vila was in the folklore of the Czechs rather early on. He refers to a mention in the 15th century Czech verse O Jetřichovi Berúnském ("Of Dietrich von Bern") adapted from the German epic, where Dietrich ("Getrich") tears off a (magical) belt (Note: pasec, in modern spelling, pásek or pás, "belt".) off the dwarf Laurin ("Lavryn"), which was a gift from the víly (wilij). He also lists place names apparently named after them in Bohemia and Moravia (Vilice near Tábor, Vilov near Domažlice, and Vilín near Sedlčany) which seem to indicate that the being was known in Czech folklore from more ancient times.

=== East Slavic vila ===
The vile is mentioned in the Slovo nyekoego Khristolyubtsa attributed to Khristolyubtsa ("Christ-lover") dated to the 14th century (or 12th century (Note: However Georgieva seems to date "Homily of a Christ-lover" to 11th–12th century in one passage, while dating "Sermon of a Christ-lover" to the 14th century elsewhere.)) where the vila is mentioned alongside Perun, Khors and other more obscure pagan divinities; the author reviles their worshipers for offering sacrifices to the vili (said to consist of thirty sisters) by slaughtering chicken, and praying over the korovay (for them). But the folklore of vila did not remain current or well-known outside the sphere of South Slavs. It has been suggested that the Russians, having forgot the vila, came to know them in contemporary times through literary transmissions (via books) from Southern Slavic areas, though this widely held view may not be so certain.

=== Etymology ===
The etymology remains in dispute. Possible explanations are from the Slavic verb viti (вити, "to wind around, twist, weave") (Note: Reiter (1973), p. 203 and Mladenov (1965) Etimologicheski i pravopisen rechnik na bŭlgarskiya knizhoven ezik Етимологически и правописен речник на българския книжовен език (ЕтР) [Etymological and Orthographic Dictionary of the Bulgarian Standard Language], p. 650, cited by Dukova (1983)) and Church Slavonic: vichъrь/vixъrъ "whirlwind"; (Note: i.e., cognate with Bulgarian: вихър 'whirwind', whose PIE stem is Church Slavonic: vixъrъ) or from Sanskrit/Old Indic:vāyú- "air", ultimately from Proto-Indo-European u̯ēi̯o- "wind".

The term vila has also been etymologically linked to Lithuanian vyti (lit. 'chase, pursue'), cognate with Sanskrit vī, vêti (lit. 'to go, drive'), often attributed to Alexander A. Potebnja (1879), (Note: Potebnja (1879), p. 260 cited by Šteingolde (1999), p. 252) though Potebnja himself credits Serbian linguist Đuro Daničić for linking the Serbian vila with these lexemes. The rationale for this naming may have been because the vila is a fairy who races through the air chases the clouds away. (Note: Goryayev (1896), p. 48, cited by Preobrazhensky (1914).) Avestan vayeiti (lit. '[he] drives, pursues, frightens') and Old Icelandic veiðr (lit. 'hunting, catching') were also added to the grouping as cognates by later linguists.

Potebnja's observations etymologically tracing vila to the Slavic verbs viti ('to wind, weave', aforementioned) or veiu (вѣю '[I] blows', (Note: Conjugation of вѣять ≈ веять 'to blow')) leads to the further trace to Indo-European roots *uei- ('to drive, chase'), *uoi- ('to turn, bend' or 'to wage war'). It has otherwise been explained that the etymologies from Potebnja's contemporary period seems to substantiate a link to the Indo-European root *ṷēi or *ṷeiāx-, which is cognate with Old Church Slavonic von (вон), povinzti (повинжти), and vŭzvitik (възвитик) meaning 'profit'. (Note: Modern Russian: прибыль.) These semantic seems to lead to the formulation that vila held the original senses of 'one who pursues or overtakes; warrior-maiden, huntress'. However, attempts at identifying the vila with the Germanic valkyrie have lacked sufficient grounds.

An alternate etymology pursued by Miklosich and later by Niederle attempts to connect vili with Polish wiła in the sense of "fool" and Czech vilý in the sense of "mad", arriving at the supposed stem vil meaning 'possessed, driven mad'.

== Folkloric accounts ==
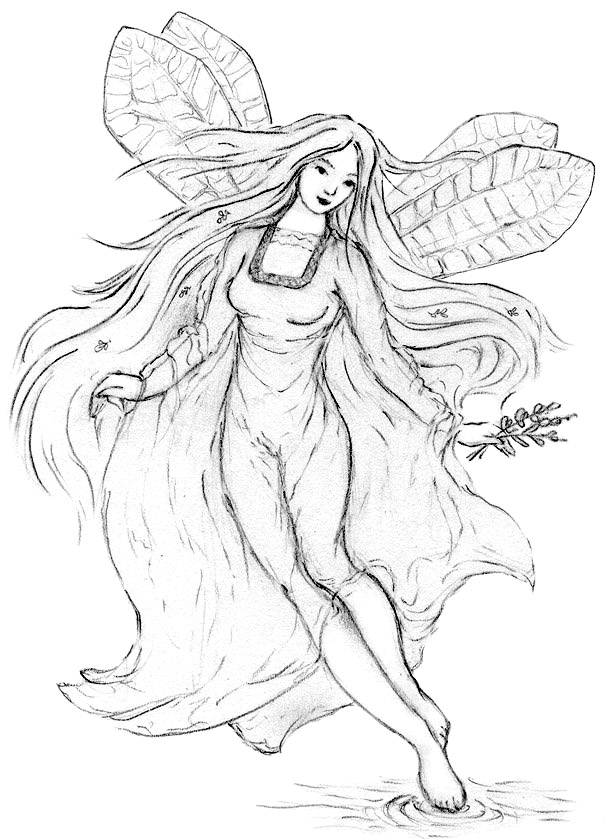
Polish artist's impression of a wiła

The vilas are beautiful female spirits of nature (or elf-like beings) with flowing blonde hair, descending to the chest and back. But they manifest an ambivalent relationship with humans. In fairy tales, they are easily affroted when their dance or meal is interrupted act with malice towards them, inflicting death or sickness with their arrows, killing sisters, stealing the eyes of old men, petrifying husbands, destroying crops. They steal children and substitute them with changelings. On the other hand, they may also help the hero by giving him magical objects and mounts.

They have dominion over water, thus unleash storms upon humans who cross them. They may also show warrior-like qualities, riding a deer or stag into battle, or to hunt forest game.

The folk venerated or appeased them with offerings of flowers, food and drink placed in front of caves where they were believed to live. They may demand human sacrifice, typically fraternal twins.

=== Taxonomy of the vila ===
There are basically three kinds of vile: the air, water, and earth types. (Note: The cave/mountain, water, and cloud type according to Schneeweis; rock (skalní), forest (lesní), and water (vodni) types according to Niederle.) Or rather, three major categories of vile under a system established by the Croatian Ivan Kukuljević Sakcinski (1851) and adopted by other commentators thereafter.

The "aerial fairy" (zračne vile) dwell up in the sky or clouds, endowed with wings, and generally positively disposed towards humans and remain benevolent, according to Kukuljević Sakcinski. They are also referred to as the "cloud fairy" (vile oblakinje. (Note: cf. Macedonian: облаќињи.)

The "water fairy" (povodne vile are either the Serbo-Croatian: povodkinja ("underwater fairy") which is actually a freshwater subtype, or, if it is a type residing in the seas commonly referred to as a morska djevica ("sea maiden", aka morska diklica, morska puce). To the aquatic type also belongs the brodarice (бродарице) or brodarica vila ("vila boat-rider") who excises a boatman's fee (paid by body parts) for permission to take drinking water from the watering hole she guards. For instance a man wishing to drink from their sacred spring must lose his sight, and his horse loses the use of its legs.

The last category, the terrestrial type is the vila zemna ("earth fairy", plural: vile zemne), also styled pozemna vila, (plural: pozemne vile). Of these, the "mountain fairy" (vila planinska вила планинска) subtype may variously bear the epithet planinska (plural: planinske or gorska (plural: gorske) (also styled zagorkinje загоркиње or nagorkinje нагоркиње). The "field fairy" subtype (plural:vpoljske)) is also known, as well as the sylvan type vila gorska (вила горска "forest vila") or vila lesna (вила лѣсна "woodland vila"). The terrestrial class may be cruel or generous towards humans; they are characterized by their hoofed bestial legs.

Similar subtypes are known in Macedoninan lore, (Note: Macedonian lore name subtypes such as oblakjinji облаќињи "cloud fairy", planinki планинки "mountain fairy" and ezerkinji езеркињи "lake fairy".) and Bulgarian lore for the samovila. (Note: The samovila of the forest, gorska, samogorska (горске, самогорске); of the sea, morska (морске); and beyond the sea, prekomorska ((прѣкоморске).)

=== Appearance and human interaction ===
The vila are like beautiful maidens in appearance, wearing translucent (or fine white (Note: According to the lore of Slovene Carinthia or Carinthian Slovenes, their dress is not just white but golden, accented by a silver belt.)) raiments, but may have hooves (legs of goat, donkey, or horse). (Note: This trait of hoofed leg being peculiar to the earth vile, as aforementioned.) Their hair is either light blonde (плав) or golden. They have eyes that flash up. (Note: Or flashing like lightning.)

They also shapeshift their appearance into swans, and can also transform into falcons, wolves, snakes, etc. Cloud nymphs appear as a whirlwind. At night, they roam the clouds emitting a terrible noise of pipes and drums. Anyone who calls them becomes stiff and moves only with difficulty. He is stricken by disease and dies within a year or two.

Their favorite pastime is song and dance. They engage in round dances in the earth (on the "fairy playground" вилинско игралиште) or up in the clouds — that is to say, the kolo dance among the Serbs (vrzino kolo врзино коло, Serbo-Croatian: vilino kolo) and horo dance among the Bulgarians (vrzulovo horo врзулово хоро) and Macedonians (samovilsko oro самовилско оро).

Their singing is so enchanting that men become captivated upon hearing it once. They typically become associated with, or bonded to heroes. A man favored by a vila is called a vilenjik or vilaš. According to one tradition, a vila (who is said to use lightning as arrows to strike down enemies.) will strike a hero with her arrow then heal him, binding the wound with the hem of her skirt, after which he becomes her sworn brother.

Thus the epic hero (junak) typically has a vila attached to him who is his sworn sister (Serbo-Croatian: posestrima). The vila's milk is said to endow superhuman strength, and Serbian epic almost invariably sings of its hero being suckled by a vila. Such vila-bonded heroes occur in Serbian epic poetry as well as Croatian. The best known is the Vila Serbo-Croatian: Ravijojla, sworn sister to Kraljević Marko (Note: Also styled "Ravioyla".) (cf. top image). Marko had been suckled by a vila, obtaining his superhuman strength, and also received the gift of his horse Šarac. He even marries a vila at one time. Marko also occasioned to come into strife with vili, especially the wicked ferrywomen trying to exact heavy tolls for crossing water.

The vili may otherwise seek the love of handsome strong men, and even sometimes marry them. Even girls can have vile as sworn sisters and may ask them to improve one's beauty or to protect a distant lover.

As already foreshadowed, they are skilled in the art of healing, and such fairies may bear the epithet biljarice (биљарице "herbalist"; var. vidarice видарице).

According to folklore, they are born from clouds, or from dews of wildflowers. If it rains during sunshine and a rainbow appears, this is regarded as a sign that the vili are combing hair, or a vila has given birth.

The mountain vili establish court inside caves and gorges, yet their dwelling place is lush with greenery and flowers. Other accounts tell of vili living in crystal palaces adorned with pearl. Or that the vili build splendid castles in the sky.

The vilas are also prominent in folk tales and folk songs of Serbia and elsewhere, including Bosniak epic poetry, and for instance, the Bosniak hero Mujo Hrnjica interacts with the vila in one song. (Note: Hörmann, Kosta (1888–1889) Narodne pjesne Muhamedovaca u Bosni i Hercegovini I No. XXXV, discussed by Skendi (1954).) (Note: For the Hörmann anthology of in connection with the Bosnian vila, cf. Concetti (2012), p. 198)

It is not rare for a vila to guide warriors on their path or nourish and help them when they are injured. Folk tales of a vila raising the Hrnjica brothers are well known, where one brother gains his strength from the vila and the other brother his beauty. Other folk tales mention vilas helping in the defense of towns.

Within the Czech tradition, víly are almost always malicious, unless respected and avoided. They are portrayed as beautiful women with long flowing hair who primarily live in the woods, in marches, or in forest clearings. They are said to try to entrance men who wander into their land by their looks and beautiful voices. Víly are also said to live in groups and are keen on dancing in circles, which was also another way of trapping people as it was believed that if you were to start dancing with them you would never return home. In Slovakia, the vile are the restless souls of deceased girls who lure young men into a deadly circle dance.

According to F. S. Copeland, in Slovene folklore, the vile (which she translated as 'White Ladies') are wise and benevolent beings from forests, water bodies and mountains who help women in childbirth and heroes in epic stories. In another article, according to Copeland, the word was known near the Croatian border (e.g., in Bela Krajna), but it was also "familiar" among the Slovenes of Styria and Beyond-the-Mura.

=== Folktale examples ===
Slovenian-born ethnographer Matija Kračmanov Valjavec (1858) compiled an anthology of folktales from the area of Varaždin, Croatia. Some of these have been presented in German by the Croatian-Austrian ethnographer Friedrich Salomon Krauss in his anthology of 1883. For example, "The prince and the vila", "The vila in Molingrad", "The vili guarding the boys", "Bendeš-vila Mandalena" "The vila in the golden mansion", "The vili assist the boy" and "The vili at the boy's aid"

Krauss later presented an analysis of the vila in 1890 based on the now largely debunked theories of Wilhelm Mannhardt. The song and tale fragments he collected for this 1890 work has been criticized as demonstrating unconventional combinations of motivs, either via an iconoclast crafter of retelling, or perhaps not even an inauthentic version inserted by Krauss to serve his thesis. (Note: Other pieces are authentic all right, but not truly representative of the wider tradition.)

=== Russian wonder tales ===
Examples from the Russian wonder tale (skazka) genre will be given below.

==== The Youth and the Vila ====
In the fairy tale The Youth and the Vila, the youngest son, who is considered a fool by his two elder brothers, manages to pluck the golden hairs of a vila who has been eating the silver pears of his father's garden. He later takes her back to his father's house.

==== The Vila in the Golden Castle ====
In the Russian fairy tale The Vila in the Golden Castle, a father asks his three sons to guard his flower garden at night because swans have been eating the flowers (in reality, the vilas were). The vila returns home to the golden castle which prompts the youth to seek her. There, an old vila, the girl's mother, sets tasks for him to perform.

== Legacy ==
According to ethnologist Éva Pócs, the word vila also appears in the Serbian and Croatian words vilovnjak, vilenjak, vilenica, vilaš - all referring to a type of "fairy magician", people who, as per historical and folkloric records, were given powers by the vilas ("fairies").

== Western European references ==
=== Dictionaries ===
Meyer's Konversationslexikon defines Wiles or Wilis as female vampires: the spirits of betrothed girls who die before their wedding night. According to Heine, wilis are unable to rest in their graves because they could not satisfy their passion for dancing naked, especially in town squares. They also gather on the highway at midnight to lure young men and dance them to their death. In Serbia, they were maidens cursed by God; in Bulgaria, they were known as samodiva: girls who died before they were baptized; and in Poland, they are beautiful young girls floating in the air atoning for frivolous past lives. In some tales, the reason for abandoning their loves is tragic; the Vila are cursed never to find their true love, and if they do, that love will die a terrible death.

=== Literature ===
This legend inspired Victor Hugo to include "les wilis" in his poem "Fantômes" in Les Orientales (1828).

Heinrich Heine in his 1835 De l'Allemagne vividly describes "die Wilis" as a Slavic legend.

In J.K. Rowling's Harry Potter series, veela are magical beings who resemble stunningly beautiful women. They can put men into a trance with their singing and dancing, and, when angered, they transform into horrific, bird-like creatures and can launch fireballs from their hands. Veela appear in the fourth book of the series, Harry Potter and the Goblet of Fire, where they serve as mascots to the Bulgarian Quidditch team during the Quidditch World Cup. The character Fleur Delacour is also a quarter-veela.

In Heather Walter's Malice duology, the vila serve as a darker counterpart to other fae, based more closely on the Irish interpretations.

=== Theatre and opera ===
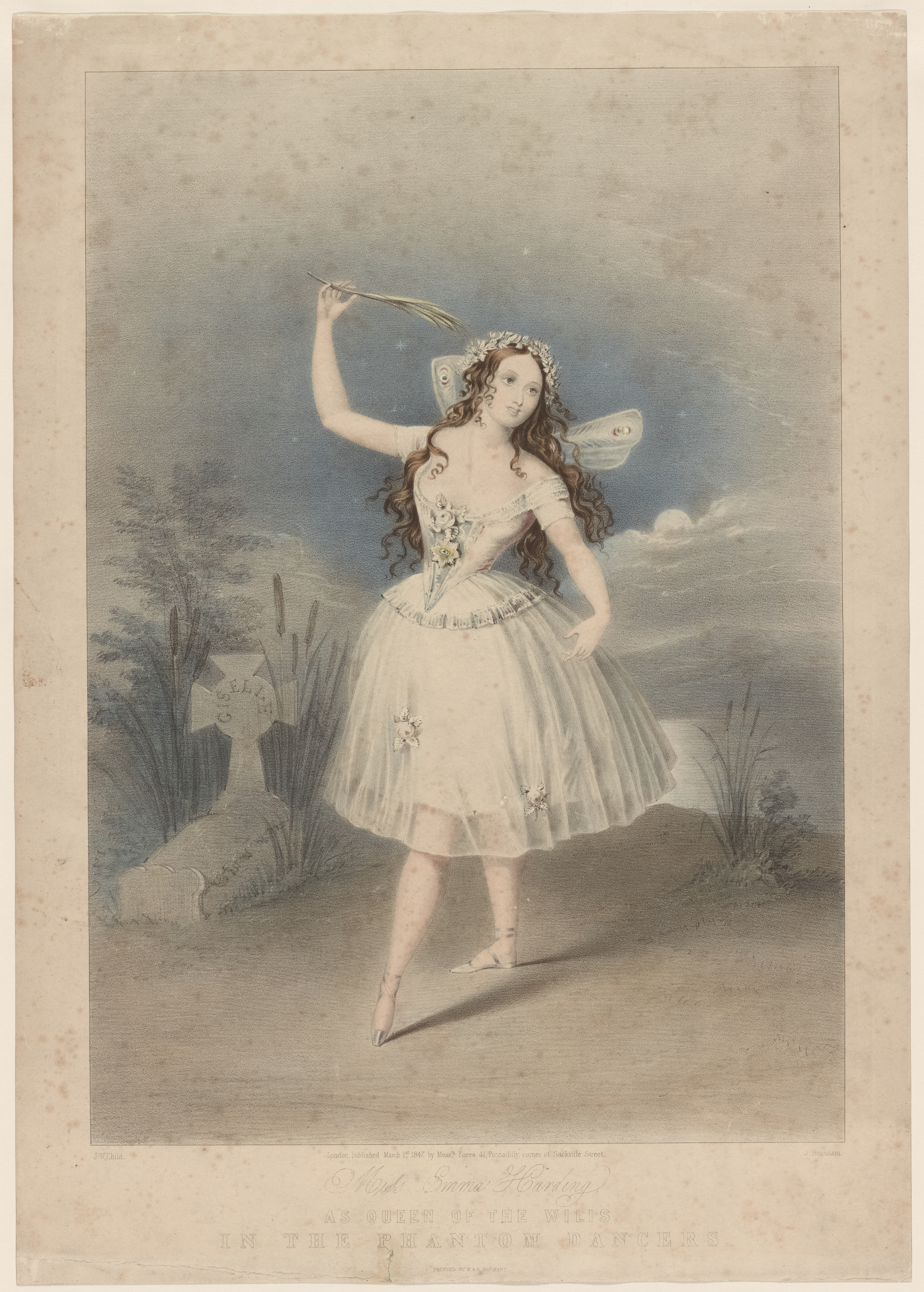
Emma Harding in costume as "Queen of the Wilis" in Giselle

The wilis appear in Adolphe Adam's Romantic ballet Giselle, first danced in Paris in 1841, as the ghosts of young girls who were betrayed by their lovers and who died before their wedding days. They dance in the forests on moonlit nights, punishing young men by dancing them to death, but they must disappear at the break of dawn. These Wilis snatch away the villainous Hilarion's life-breath and almost do the same for the hero, Albrecht, but he is saved by the love of the ghostly Giselle.

The first opera completed by Giacomo Puccini, Le Villi, makes free use of the same thematic material. It had its debut in May 1884 at the Teatro Dal Verme, Milan and was revised for a more successful reception at the Royal Theater, Turin that December.

In "The Vilia Song" (German: Das Vilja-Lied), from the 1905 operetta The Merry Widow (German: Die lustige Witwe) by Franz Lehár, Viktor Léon and Leo Stein (and translated by Adrian Ross), a hunter pines for Vilia, "the witch of the wood", a fairy being who causes him to fall in love with her and then vanishes.
