= Mustay-Bey of Lika =

Character in Bosniak epics

Mustay-Bey of Lika (Bosnian: Mustaj-beg Lički) is a semi-historical figure from the epic poetry of the Bosniaks. Stories featuring the character can be found among Bosniaks in all regions, though he predominantly features in the epic poetry of Bosnian Krajina (Frontier) region.

Just like other frontier songs (Krajišničke Pjesme), stories surrounding Mustay-Bey usually showcase the same themes as other stories originating from the region: raids and fights between Muslims and Christians. Even though most of the stories are fictional, the historic background is noticeable. Most of the stories were created when a Bosnian-Croatian frontier existed, separating the Ottoman Empire from the Habsburgs and the Western world, where frequent raids and fights along the border between Muslims and Christians occurred.

== Historical background ==
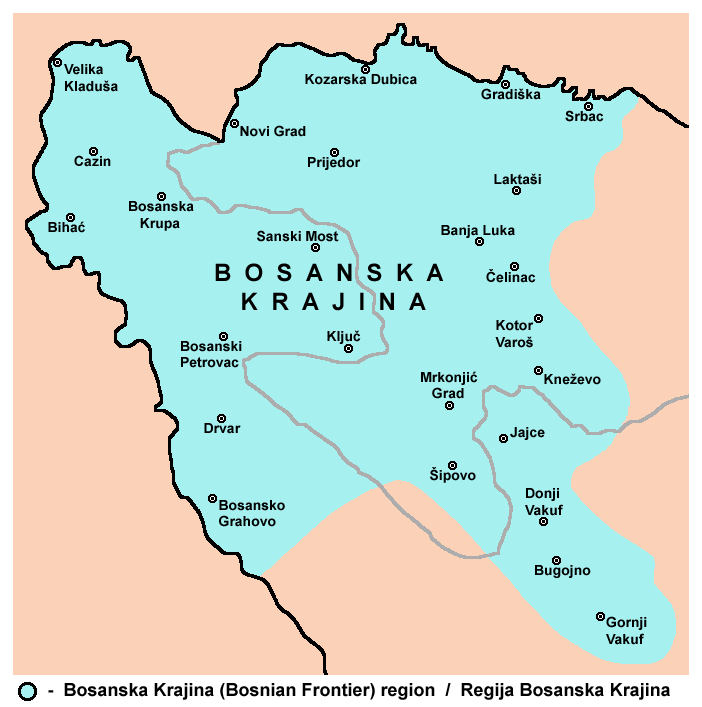
Bosnian Krajina region

There is consensus that Mustay-Bey is based on an actual person, but this person itself is unknown. Various theories have been put forward, Evliya Çelebi calls him Mustaj-Beg Hasumović; Mustafa Imamović connects the figure of Mustay-Bey to a Mustafa Hurakalović that lived during the 17th century. Luka Marjanović notes that, according to legend, Mustay-Bey hails from the Lipovača tribe from Mostar.

Older Croat historians' works help in confirming Mustay-Bey's identity. Historical sources mention a Mustaj-Beg that, in 1556, was captured by a Frankopan and later released, after a ransom of several thousand ducats was paid. Similarly, many songs in the Krajina region concern the theme of Mustay-Bey being captured and released, such as: "Ropstvo Mustaj-Bega i Vrišić bajraktara, 'The capture of Mustay-Bey and Vrišić Bayraktar' and Mustaj-Beg Lički u ropstvu kod zadarskoga bana, 'Mustay-Bey of Lika captured at the Ban of Zadar'.

Evliya Çelebi mentions how Melek Ahmed-Pasha sent him to buy back a certain Mustay-Bey Hasumović that was captured by the forces of Nikola IV Zrinski. He also mentions that, while he lived, songs about Mustay-Bey were already being sung.

Mustay-Bey was most likely the highest authority in Lika and Krajina at the time, as a frontiersman (Serbo-Croatian: Krajišnik) and commander, who had his headquarters in Udbina. Perhaps his importance was increased by the fact that, after the establishment of captaincies in Krajina, the captain of Bihać was the supreme authority over all other captaincies. In Kosta Hörmann's collections a wife and a daughter named Zlatija are mentioned.

Even though legend tells of Mustay being from Herzegovina, the figure was created in the Krajina and later transmitted to other parts of Bosnia, Herzegovina and Sandžak.

== Tales ==
Mustay-Bey is a well respected figure among Krajina's population, as reported by Luka Marjanović:

As a result of the mentioned conditions, in which people lived, fought and reconciled at that time, one person stands out, Mustaj-Beg of Lika, the most popular hero and lord of Lika and Krbava. What individual people have experienced and suffered, Mustay-Bey has aswell. From a very young age, he was elevated to a prominent position, from which he looked down on others and others at him, from the last "Turk" of Lika to the emperor in Stambol.

— Luka Marjanović

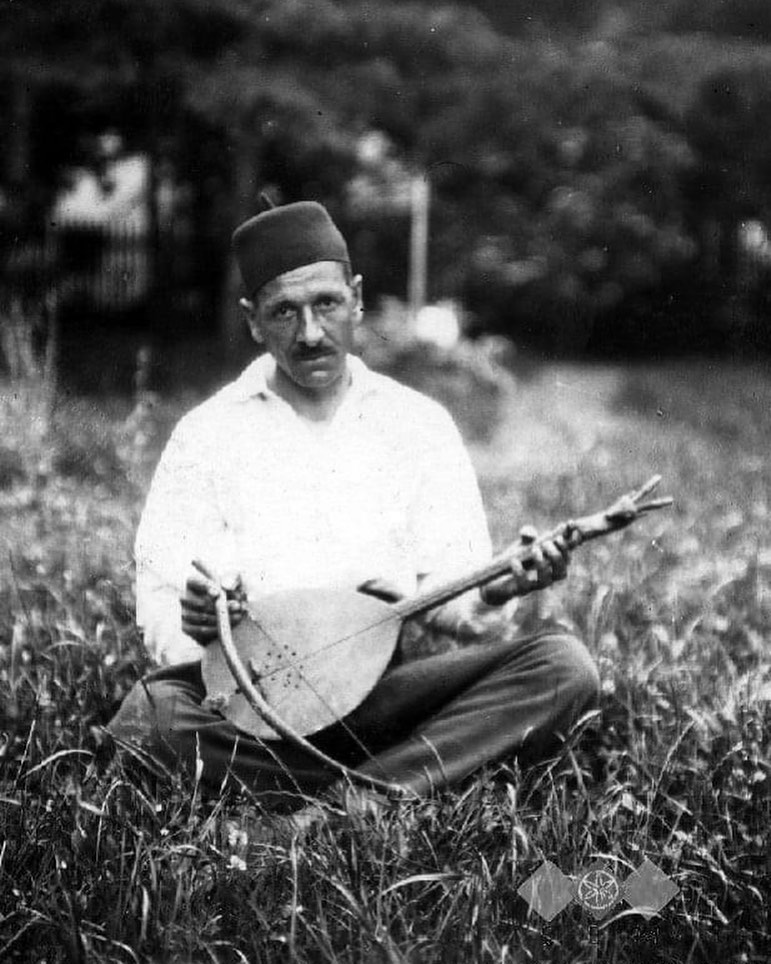
The Gusle, which often accompanied epic songs

Another well known saying in the Krajina, from the song Budalina Tale dolazi u Liku, 'Tale of the fool arriving in Lika', is:

That's what Mustay-Bey from Lika said, That's what all the Turks in Lika said.

Meaning the words of Mustay-Bey are law. The Turks mentioned refer to islamized slavic inhabitants of the region.

Like most songs from Krajina, the main character very rarely acts alone. He is often accompanied by Đerzelez, the Hrnjica brothers or Budalina Tale. Mustay-Bey usually leads his companions in these stories. For both military actions and bridal processions, it was necessary to seek his permission. If Mustay decided on a battle, a cannon would be fired to inform all of Krajina that they should prepare for battle.

Mustay always has the role of an authority, the guardian of Krajina and personification of the legal system. As a great and wise old man, he never rushed into battle, but rather showed concern for the lives of his soldiers. He never deviates from the knightly rules of warfare, even if it is to his disadvantage. In one tale he forbids Meho Dizdarević from coming to the aid of Đulić, since Đulić's was to duel alone. He forbids his knights to loot Mostar, causing the Krajišniks to angrily return to Krajina. He forbids Muslims to exact revenge on Christians, because "the infidel might tribulate the Muslims later".

=== Deaths of Mustay-Bey ===
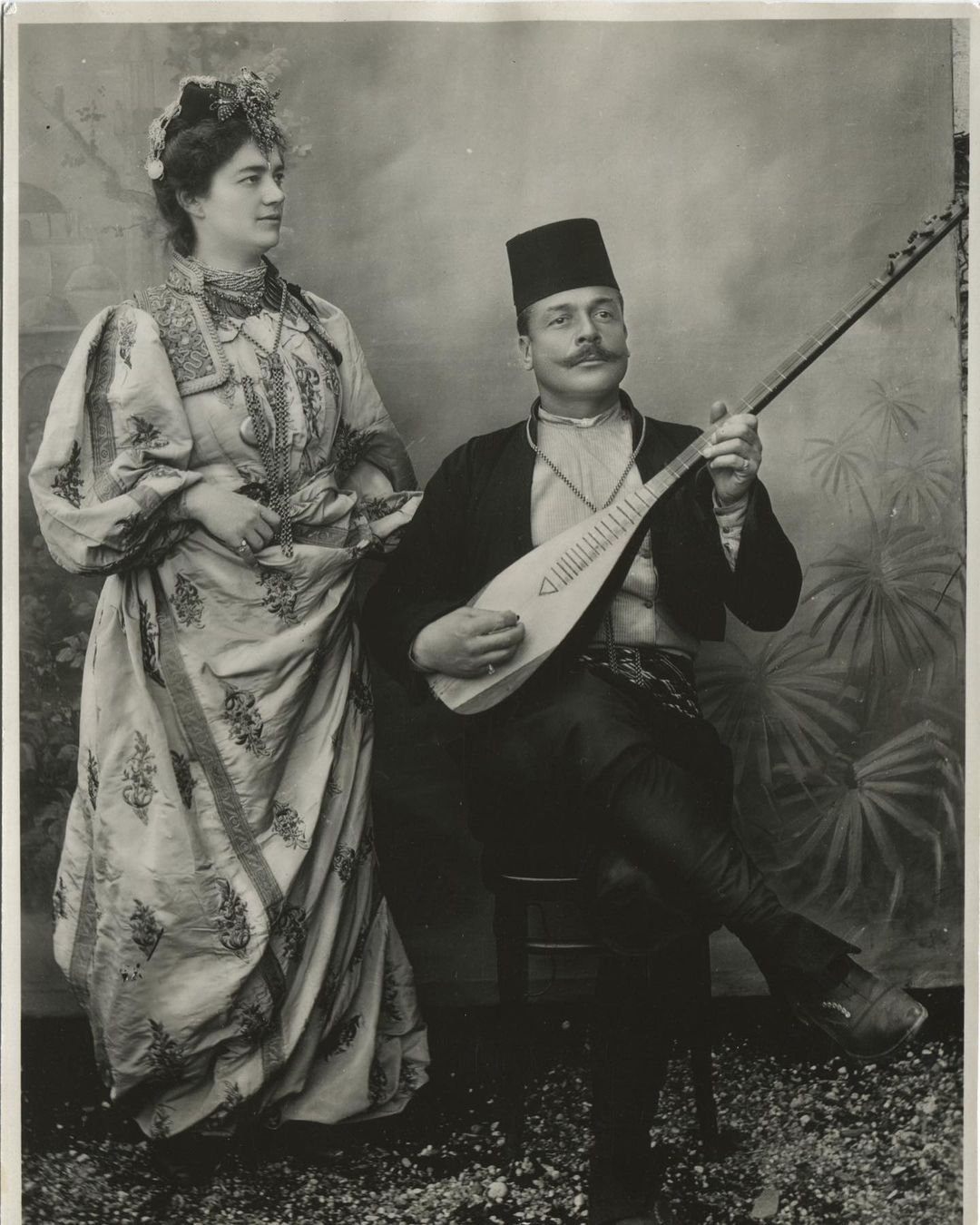
A šargija often accompanied epic poetry in the Krajina region

Many songs mention the death of Mustay-Bey. As protector of Krajina from the Christians, Mustay gains the role of a martyr. One song contained in the collection of Kosta Hörmann says:

Do you realize, you insolent ones,

look, a full seven years have passed since our Beg was killed. Ah, you haven't rushed out to go down to the Beg's valley to see the fallen towers and the Beg's poor people

and Bećir, Mustaj Beg's son.

— Hörmann I, 30.16-22

Songs collected by Milman Parry and Albert Lord in Sandžak all mention a curse placed upon the bey after he fails to resist a Christian woman named Janja.

"Why, Beg, are you behaving so disgracefully?

For Janja was born to a Christian woman, and was nursed on wine and brandy, but I was born to a Turkish (Muslim) mother, and was nursed on honey and sugar. Listen to me, Mustaj Beg of Lika! If you raise an army at Uzorje, and capture Janja, the sister of Jovan, then may Jovan catch you at the mountain,

and may he cut off your head, my Beg!"

— Guslar Hajro Ferizović

== See also ==
- Bosniak epic poetry
- Bosnian Krajina
- Epic Poetry
