= The Singer of Tales =

1960 book by Albert Lord

- Cover of the Second Edition
- Author: Albert Lord
- Language: English
- Subject: Epic poetry, oral tradition
- Published: Cambridge, MA
- Publisher: Harvard University Press
- Publication date: 1960
- Publication place: United States
- ISBN: 9780674975736 (2019 edition)
- Website: https://chs.harvard.edu/book/lord-albert-bates-the-singer-of-tales/

The Singer of Tales is a book by Albert Lord that formulates oral tradition as a theory of literary composition and its applications to Homeric and medieval epic. Lord builds on the research of Milman Parry and their joint work recording Balkan guslar poets. in the early 1930s. It was published in 1960.

== Summary ==
The book is divided into two parts. The first part concentrates on the theory of oral-formulaic composition and its implications for bards who would recite epic poetry and the eventual literary figures who converted that oral material into written form. His development of the theory is firmly rooted in studies of contemporary Serbo-Croatian poets who primarily use oral formulas to remember long passages that make up songs and epic.

Chapter One, Introduction, gives the reader a brief outline of the history of the oral-formulaic theory and stresses the importance of the contributions of Milman Parry to the theory.

Chapter Two, Singers: Performance and Training, attempts to define the performer in question. It asks and attempts to answer the question of who were these traveling bards who would move from province to province to recite great epic. Moreover, the chapter discusses the level of control that Ancient performers had over these tales; it concludes that those who have to memorize such long tales never tell the same story twice with the same wording by examining the examples set by Serbo-Croatian poets. He describes three stages in the training of an oral poet. In the first, passive stage in which a young boy learns the themes and general structures of an epic. In the second stage, he first attempts to put the stories he knows in the context of the meter of poetic verse; finally, he attempts to recite-compose his first complete poem.

Chapter Three, The Formula, discusses what Lord believes to be a classic oral formula. In doing so, he borrows Parry's definition that defines a formula as "a group of words which is regularly employed under the same metrical conditions to express a given essential idea." Parry's formulas are almost mathematical in nature; his discussion focuses on repetitions of meter and pitch more than textual content. However, he also notes that oral poets learn their epics like one would learn a living, evolving language.

Chapter Four, The Theme, focuses on the repetitions in content that appear in ancient epic. Parry writes that the same theme can be expressed by many different formulas, and analyzes several examples from Serbo-Croatian poetry to demonstrate his points.

Chapter Five, Songs and the Song, follows the intrinsic distinctions between the bard's attitude towards his own work and the tendency of modern scholars to think of the oral-formulaic poem as "a given text that undergoes change from one singing to another." In fact, he says, the ancient bard was more likely to think of himself as a "flexible plan of themes.". As a result of this, epic tends to change over time as imperfect memories bend the traditions in new ways.

Chapter Six, Writing and Oral Tradition, describes the effect of the oral tradition on the writing of a given culture while also examining the transition of stories from an oral to a written (manuscript) tradition. However, he says, while the writing of a culture can affect its oral tradition, that is by no means a requirement. Since oral poems are so fluid in nature, any written records we have of them represent only one performance of them. As a result, as writing replaced oral tradition, the two could not live in symbiosis and the latter disappeared.

The second part of the book shows the application of the theory discussed in the first half to the work of Homer in general before more carefully examining its application to the Iliad, Odyssey, and medieval epic.

Chapter Seven, Homer, attempts to prove, using the theory developed in the first half of the book, that the poet modern-day readers refer to as Homer was an oral-formulaic composer.

Chapters Eight and Nine, The Odyssey and The Iliad, examine both works in the context of composition by an oral poet.

Chapter Ten, Some Notes on Medieval Epic, does the same for medieval French and English poetic epic, with a focus on similarities between Beowulf and Homeric epic, as well as other medieval epics such as the Song of Roland and a medieval Greek poem called Digenes Akritas.

== Sources ==
Lord, Albert B. The Singer of Tales. Cambridge, MA: Harvard University Press, 1960.
