= Nada (magazine) =

Bosnian literary and arts magazine

Nada (Hope) was a Bosnian literary and arts magazine published between 1895 and 1903. It was the first Bosnian magazine comparable to other European cultural journals. It had the backing of the Austro-Hungarian monarchy; Kosta Hörmann and Béni Kállay were the driving force behind the magazine's founding. Hörmann would serve as its editor. After Kállay died in 1903, the magazine lost its impetus, and Bosnian nationalism shifted into a new form. The magazine remains an invaluable source of information on cultural life in Bosnia in the period.

== Contents ==
Ewald Arndt Čeplin was the magazine's chief illustrator for its entire life. His brother Leo, Ivana Kobilca and Maximilian Liebenwein were the other permanent illustrators; 23 reproductions of Kobilca's other work also appeared on its pages. These four formed the obscure 'Sarajevo Painter's Club', and launched exhibitions of original art and illustrations from Nada in Austria, Germany and Hungary.

=== Other contributors ===
- Vlaho Bukovac
- Klement Crnčić
- Celestin Medović
- Pavle Jovanović
- Virgil Meneghello Dinčić
- Ludvik Kuba
- Alphonse Mucha
- Adolf Kaufmann
- Anna Lynke
- Anastasije Bocarić
- Špiro Bocarić

== Cultural politics ==
In the period that the magazine was published, Austria-Hungary were occupying Bosnia and exercised de facto control, but had not yet formally annexed the region. Nada was explicitly a cultural project of the Austro-Hungarian monarchy. Its aim was to "diminish or entirely eliminate the influence of the Croatian and the Serbian newspapers and magazines and making the domestic opposition newspapers". The name itself reflects this: Hörmann chose it to signify "hope in the progress of the people towards Austria", by reinforcing the Bosnian sense of nationality. It set out to be secular and did not seek "open conflict", but instead sought "morally correct reporting" with horizons beyond just Bosnia or the Austro-Hungarian monarchy. Kecmanović (1963) takes the position that Hörmann and Kállay pursued the policy of inventing an "artificial" Bosnian identity to aid Austria-Hungary in Cathlocicising the region, which first required Serbian "denationalisation".

== Further sources ==
- Kecmanović, Ilija (1963). "O jednoj neobičnoj književnoj karijeri u Sarajevu od 1878. do 1919. godine". Prilozi za proučavanje istorije Sarajeva. 1 (1).
- Ćorić, Boris (1978). Nada. Književnoistorijska monografija 1895-1903. Svjetlost.
