= Oral poetry =

Form of poetry

Oral poetry is a form of poetry that is composed and transmitted without the aid of writing. The complex relationships between written and spoken literature in some societies can make this definition hard to maintain.

== Background ==
Oral poetry is sometimes considered to include any poetry which is performed live. In many cultures, oral poetry overlaps with, or is identical with, song. Meanwhile, although the term oral etymologically means 'to do with the mouth', in some cultures oral poetry is also performed by other means, such as talking drums in some African cultures. Oral poetry exists most clearly within oral cultures, but it can survive, and indeed flourish, in highly literate cultures.

Oral poetry differs from oral literature in general because oral literature encompasses linguistic registers which are not considered poetry. In most oral literature, poetry is defined by the fact that it conforms to metrical rules; examples of non-poetic oral literature in Western culture include some jokes, speeches and storytelling.

An influential movement in the study of oral poetry, both because it helped to bring oral poetry within the realms of academic literary study and because it illuminated the ways in which poetic form and orality interrelate, has been the oral-formulaic theory developed by Milman Parry and Albert Lord. This theory showed how stock phrases could enable poets to improvise verse. One consequence of Parry and Lord's work is that orally improvised poetry (as opposed to poetry which is composed without the use of writing but then memorised and performed later) is sometimes seen as the example par excellence of oral poetry. Examples of orally improvised poetry are the epics of the Serbo-Croatian guslars studied by Parry and Lord, Basque bertsolaritza, and freestyle rap.

Much oral poetry, however, is memorised verbatim – though the precise wording, particularly of words which are not essential to sense or metre, do tend to change from one performance to another, and one performer to another. Although the original composition of a memorised oral poem may have been undertaken without the use of writing, memorial traditions sometimes originate in a written text. Likewise, memorised oral poems can come to be written down, leading to a situation in which written versions in turn influence memorised versions. Prominent examples of memorised oral poetry are some nursery rhymes, ballads and medieval Scandinavian skaldic verse.

== Regional and national traditions ==
Poetical improvisation is a living tradition in many parts of the world. Regional and national traditions include:

- Qewls, orally transmitted sacred hymns of the Yazidi faith composed in poetic form
- The payada in Argentina
- Basque bertsolaritza
- Għana from Malta
- The canto a braccio of Lazio, Italy
- The improvvisazione in ottava rima of Tuscany, Italy
- The stornelli and other local traditions in other parts of Italy
- Nabati, the vernacular oral poetry of Arabia
- Rap, a component of the hip hop genre of American music

== See also ==
- Ethnopoetics
- Folk poetry
- Rapping
- Oral tradition
- Poetry reading
- Sound poetry
- Spoken word
