= Oral-formulaic composition =

Theory about the formulation of epic poetry by oral poets

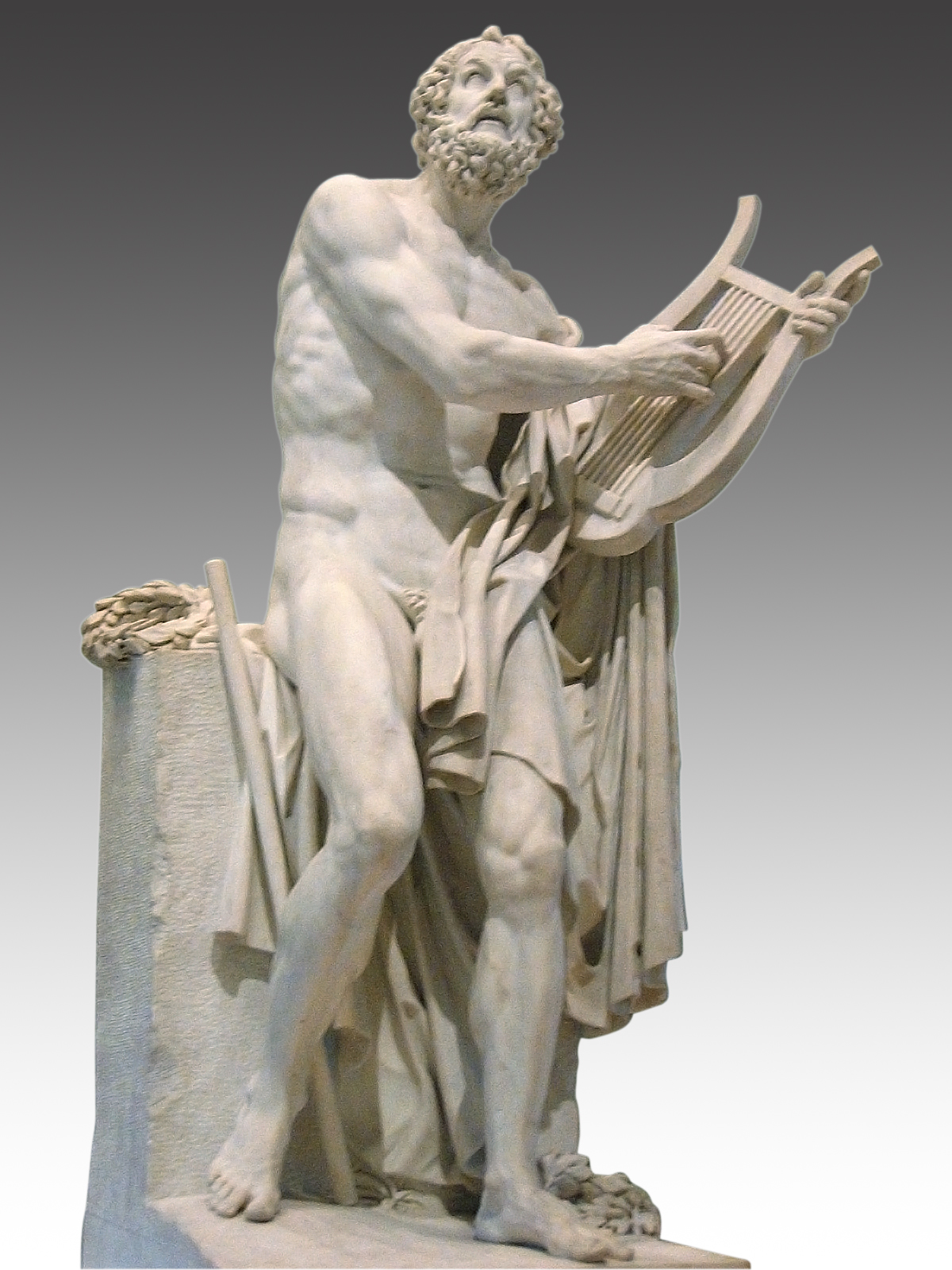
Statue depicting Homer

Oral-formulaic composition is a theory that originated in the scholarly study of epic poetry and developed in the second quarter of the twentieth century.

== Background ==
The oral-formulaic composition theory seeks to explain two related issues with regard to the composition of epic poetry:

1. the process by which oral poets improvise poetry
2. the reasons for orally improvised poetry (or written poetry deriving from traditions of oral improvisation) having the characteristics that it does

The key idea of the theory is that poets have a store of formulae (a formula being 'an expression that is regularly used, under the same metrical conditions, to express a particular essential idea') and that by linking the formulae in conventionalised ways, poets can rapidly compose verse. Antoine Meillet expressed the idea in 1923, thus:

Homeric epic is entirely composed of formulae handed down from poet to poet. An examination of any passage will quickly reveal that it is made up of lines and fragments of lines which are reproduced word for word in one or several other passages. Even those lines of which the parts happen not to recur in any other passage have the same formulaic character, and it is doubtless pure chance that they are not attested elsewhere.

In the hands of Meillet's student Milman Parry (1902–1935), and subsequently the latter's student Albert Lord (1912–1991), the approach transformed the study of ancient and medieval poetry and of oral poetry generally. The main exponent and developer of their approaches was John Miles Foley (1947–2012).

== Homeric verse ==
In Homeric verse, a phrase like rhododaktylos eos ("rosy fingered dawn") or oinopa ponton ("winedark sea") occupies a certain metrical pattern that fits, in modular fashion, into the six-foot Greek hexameter, which aids the aoidos or bard in extemporaneous composition. (The Iliad and the Odyssey both use dactylic hexameter verse form, where every line contains six groups of syllables.) Moreover, such phrases would be subject to internal substitutions and adaptations, permitting flexibility in response to narrative and grammatical needs: podas okus Akhilleus ("swift footed Achilles") is metrically equivalent to koruthaiolos Ektor ("glancing-helmed Hector"). Formulas can also be combined into type-scenes, longer, conventionalised depictions of generic actions in epic like the steps taken to arm oneself or to prepare a ship for sea.

== Work of Parry and successors ==
Oral-formulaic theory was originally developed, principally by Parry in the 1920s, to explain how the Homeric epics could have been passed down through many generations purely through word of mouth and why its formulas appeared as they did. His work was influential in the field of Homeric scholarship and changed the discourse on the oral theory and the Homeric Question. The locus classicus for oral-formulaic poetry, however, was established by the work of Parry and his student Lord, not on oral recitation of Homer (which no longer was practiced), but on the (similar) Albanian, Bosnian and Serbian oral epic poetry in the Balkans, where researchers could observe and record oral-formulaic composition ethnographically. Formulaic variation is apparent, for example, in the following lines:

a besjedi od Orasca Tale ("But spoke of Orashatz Tale")
a besjedi Mujagin Halile ("But spoke Mujo's Halil").

Lord, and more prominently Francis Peabody Magoun (1895-1979), also applied the theory to Old English poetry (principally Beowulf) in which formulaic variation such as the following is prominent:

Hrothgar mathelode helm Scildinga ("Hrothgar spoke, protector of the Scildings")
Beowulf mathelode bearn Ecgtheowes ("Beowulf spoke, son of Ecgtheow")

Magoun thought that formulaic poetry was necessarily oral in origin. This idea sparked a major and ongoing debate over the extent to which Old English poetry, which survives only in written form, should be seen as, in some sense, oral poetry.

The oral-formulaic theory of composition has now been applied to a wide variety of languages and works. A provocative new application of oral-formulaic theory is its use in attempting to explain the origin of at least some parts of the Quran. Oral-formulaic theory has also been applied to early Japanese works. The oral-formulaic theory has also been applied to the Olonko epic of the Sakha people of Siberia.

Laura Spinney suggests that formulae may "have had the power of charms", and notes their use in tracing mythemes across different poetic traditions.

== Precursors of Parry ==
Before Parry, at least two other folklorists also noted the use of formulas among the epic tale singers of Yugoslavian (known as guslars), (something acknowledged by Parry):

1. Friedrich Salomon Krauss (1859–1938), a specialist in Yugoslavian folklore, who had done fieldwork with guslars, believed these storytellers depended on "the fixed formulas from which he neither can nor wishes to vary".
2. Arnold van Gennep (1873–1957) suggested that "the poems of the guslars consist of a juxtaposition of clichés relatively few in number and with which it suffices merely to be conversant … A fine guslar is one who handles these clichés as we play with cards, who orders them differently according to the use he wishes to make of them".

== See also ==
- People
  - Milman Parry
  - Albert Lord
  - Francis Peabody Magoun
- Ideas
  - Oral tradition
  - Oral poetry
  - Oral-formulaic theory in Anglo-Saxon poetry

== Bibliography ==
- Blum, Stephen (2023). Music Theory in Ethnomusicology. Oxford theory in ethnomusicology. Oxford University Press. ISBN 9780199303526.
- Dundes, Alan (2003). Fables of the Ancients?: Folklore in the Qur'an. Rowman & Littlefield Publishers. ISBN 9780585466774.
- Foley, John Miles (ed. and trans.), An eEdition of The Wedding of Mustajbey’s Son Bećirbey as performed by Halil Bajgorić (2005)
- Frog; Lamb, William, eds. (2022). Weathered words : formulaic language and verbal art. Cambridge, Massachusetts. ISBN 9780674278394.
- Lord, Albert B. The Singer of Tales. Cambridge: Harvard University Press, 1960 (Second edition: edited by Stephen Mitchell and Gregory Nagy, Harvard Studies in Comparative Literature 24. Cambridge, MA: Harvard University Press, 2000; Third edition: edited by David F. Elmer, Center for Hellenic Studies, 2019 ISBN 978-0674975736).
- Magoun, Francis P., Jr. "Oral-Formulaic Character of Anglo-Saxon Narrative Poetry", Speculum, 28 (1953): 446–67.
- Parry, Milman. "Studies in the Epic Technique of Oral Verse-Making. I: Homer and Homeric Style." Harvard Studies in Classical Philology Vol. 41 (1930), 73–143.
- Parry, Milman. "Studies in the Epic Technique of Oral Verse-Making. II: The Homeric Language as the Language of an Oral Poetry." Harvard Studies in Classical Philology Vol. 43 (1932), 1–50.
- Parry, Milman (1987). The making of Homeric verse : the collected papers of Milman Parry. New York: Oxford University Press. ISBN 978-0195205602.
- Reece, Steve. "Orality and Literacy: Ancient Greek Literature as Oral Literature," in David Schenker and Martin Hose (eds.), Companion to Greek Literature (Oxford: Blackwell, 2015) 43-57.
- Reece, Steve. "Greek Epic Formulae," in Giorgios Giannakis (ed.), Encyclopedia of Ancient Greek Language and Linguistics (Leiden: Brill, 2014) 613-615.
- Windelberg, Marjorie and D. Gary Miller (1980): "How (Not) to Define the Epic Formula," Olifant,8, 29-50.
