= Hrnjica Brothers =

Protagonists of Bosnian epic poetry

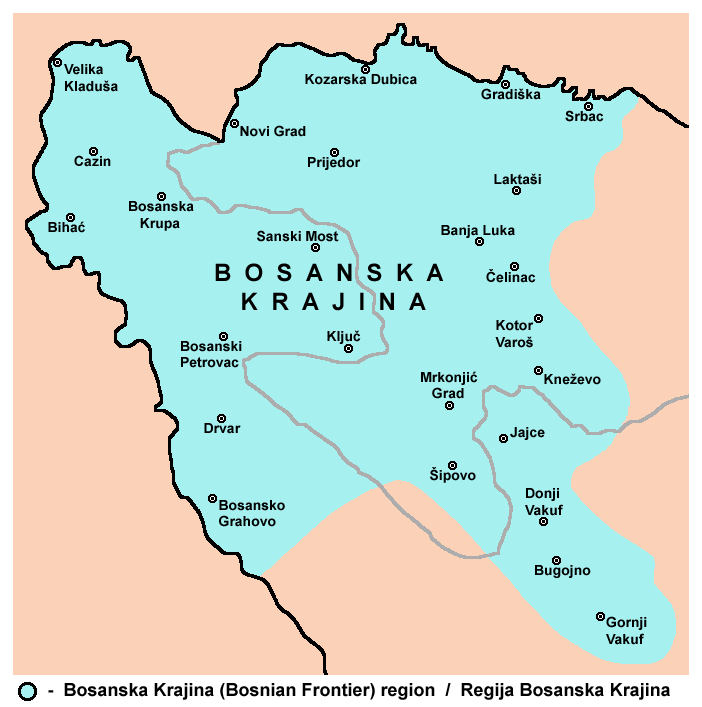
Bosnian Krajina (Frontier) Region

The Hrnjica brothers are heroes of epic poetry in Bosnia. The names of the brothers are Mujo, Halil and Omer. The epic poetry also mentions their beautiful sister Ajkuna (Bosnian: Lijepa Ajkuna). Mujo is hypocorism of Mustafa. There are several toponyms in the region of Velika Kladuša named after Hrnjica brothers, i.e. Well of Hrnjica (Bosnian: Hrnjičin bunar) or the Tower of Hrnjica (Bosnian: Hrnjičina kula). Songs about the Hrnjica brothers can usually be put in the "Krajišnik" cycle (Bosnian: pjesme o Krajišnicima). (transl. songs about the Frontiersmen) This cycle deals with the frequent raids and battles that happened in Bosnia, which at one time was a border province of the Ottoman Empire.

== Historical Background ==
Mustafa Hrnjica is historical person who was recorded as hajduk in the region of Ottoman held Velika Kladuša in 1641, together with his brothers. The source of this is Vuk Krsto Frankopan Tržački, actually sending a secret list of "Turkish" troop commanders. A part of the document explicitly mentions Mujo Hrnjica:

From Velika Kladuša. This is where we fought the most. Mustafa, the chieftain, the brother of Hrnjica brothers, called Mustafa Kazličić, /Kozličić/

— Vuk Krsto Frankopan Tržački

Halil Hrnjica is most likely a historical person as well, legend has it that he died in a battle at Banja Luka, where his tomb was located.

The Hrnjica brothers descend from village Udbina in Lika. According to legend, their father came from Asia to Udbina and married a daughter of the local nobleman, Hurem-aga Kozlić. All of these legends about the Hrnjica brothers were first made known by Ibrahim Bey Bašagić. The Hrnjica Brothers appear in South Slavic oral epic under several name variants, reflecting regional pronunciation, singer preference, and transcription practices. The most common forms are '''Hrnjica Mujo''' (also Mujo Hrnjica) and '''Hrnjica Halil'''. In some recordings and printed collections, the brothers are referred to collectively as the ''Hrnjići'' or ''Hrnjice''. As is typical of oral epic tradition, family relations, personal epithets, and narrative details may vary between performances.

== Legends ==
Within the Bosniak and Krajina epic repertoire, the Hrnjica Brothers appear as recurring heroic figures situated in a frontier setting shaped by ongoing military conflict along the Ottoman–Habsburg border. In epic narratives they are commonly involved in episodes such as raids, rescues, armed encounters, and expeditions undertaken either individually or in cooperation with other frontier leaders. Songs featuring the brothers typically emphasise themes of martial competence, kinship solidarity, and the maintenance of personal and familial honour within a borderland context.

Their representation follows established conventions of South Slavic heroic epic, in which characters are primarily defined through observable actions, public reputation, and participation in conventional narrative situations rather than through sustained psychological characterisation. Narrative structure relies on recurring patterns such as duels, border skirmishes, collective assemblies, and organised expeditions, which recur across different songs and performance contexts within the tradition.

=== Mujo Hrnjica ===
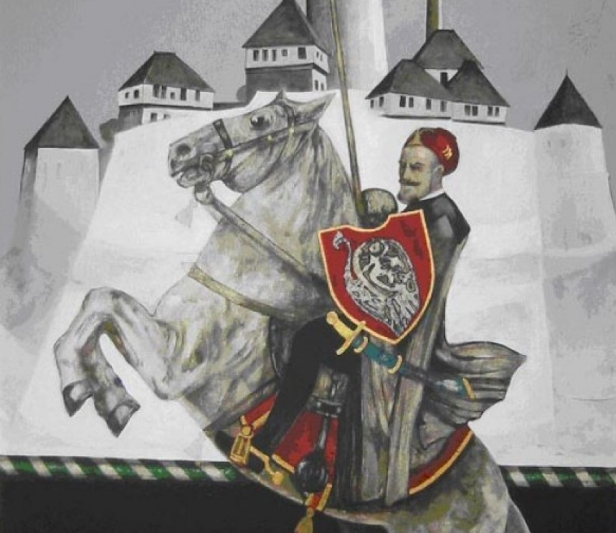
Illustration of Mujo Hrnjica

Mujo is the brother that is an archetype of a warrior from the Bosnian Krajina (Frontier). A skilled warrior that could only be killed by someone of equal prowess. His blood brother Katarica Meho is the one that killed him in the end, shooting him with a golden bullet after an ambush. The choice for it to be a golden bullet was made because in one poem, it is mentioned that Katarica Meho asks Mujo after a battle with a harambaša how it is possible that despite all the battles that Mujo goes through, lead never kills him. Mujo explains that lead can't kill him unless traces of gold are there. Legend says that the reason for Mujo's bloodbrother turning on him was because he found him with his lady.

Many poems mention Vilas (fairies) accompanying Mujo. The presence of fairies in epic poetry is a trait that Bosniak epic poetry shares with other South Slavic and Slavic national poetries. A good example of this would be the poem "The Mountain Fairies Heal Mujo Hrnjica" (Muja liječe vile planinkinje) where the mountain fairies heal the wounded hero Mujo and help him return home.

Except for being helpful in times of need, there is also an oral tradition in the Krajina region that is connected to the birth of Mujo and Halil Hrnjica. The legend states that the mountain fairy nursed Mujo with her milk, from which he received great strength and heroism.

=== Halil Hrnjica ===
Unlike Mujo, Halil dies several times. It has been recorded in the memory of Krajina that: "Mujo died once, Halil many times!". When Halil "died for the first time", according to tradition, his place was taken by his older brother, later called after Halil, and after this one, came another Halil. Halil represents heroism and heroic beauty, he was the emperor's warrior.

Legends state that the mountain fairy nursed Halil with morning dew, from which he received great beauty.

The most prominent poem where Halil Hrnjica plays a huge role is "Filip Madžarin i Gojeni Halil" (Filip the Hungarian and enlightened Halil). Filip Madžarin is the South Slavic name used for Pippo Spano. The Ottoman Sultan keeps sending warriors in vain, as Filip wins every duel, killing over 40 of the greatest warriors in the empire. It is only when he encounters Halil that he is defeated, beheaded and his head taken to Istanbul. Halil's heroic beauty is presented in this poem, as his armour and his horse are each striking. All coated in gold.

=== Omer Hrnjica ===
Omer, being the least famous of the three is still remembered in poems. He often accompanied his brothers and Mustay-Bey of Lika in their battles. Omer dies after traveling to Lika over the mountain of Plješevica, where he is ambushed by a certain harambasha named Stojan.

== List of songs ==
The songs about Hrnjica brothers include:

- Hrnjica Mujo u Janiku zarobljen
- Halil traži Mujova đogata
- Hrnjice u Skradinu
- Ženidba Hrnjice Halila
- Omer Hrnjica rescues Fatima, Mujo and Halil
- The Mountain Fairies Heal Mujo Hrnjica
- The Firman of Execution on Mujo Hrnjica
- The Death of Halil
- Mujo Hrnjica Defends Udbina
- Halil Hrnjica and Ćirko of Džlijit
- Halil rescues Ramo of Glamoč and Other Man from Glamoč from Captivity in Primorje
- Goljo the Border-Man, Mujo and Halil get their horses in Korman
- Omer Rescues Mujo, Halil and Osman from Captivity in Lenđer
- Mujo Finds His Horse
- Ajkuna Rescues the Brothers Hrnjica from Captivity in Ćorfez
- Hrnjica Mujo Avenges the Death of Mustajbey of the Lika

== See also ==
Bosniak epic poetry
