= National poetry =

This is a list of articles about poetry in a single language or produced by a single nation.

World languages will tend to have a large body of poetry contributed to by several nations (Anglosphere, Francophonie, Latin America, German-speaking Europe), while for smaller languages, the body of poetry in a particular language will be identical to the national poetry of the nation or ethnicity associated with that language.

== Contemporary ==
=== Asia ===
==== Middle East ====
- Persian poets
- Piyyut
- Modern Hebrew poetry

==== Near East ====
- Arabic poetry
- Azerbaijani literature
- Persian poetry
- Turkish poetry

==== South Asia ====
- Afghan poetry
  - Pashto literature and poetry
- Bangladeshi poetry
  - Puthi
- Indian poetry
  - Assamese Poetry
  - Bengali poetry
  - Gujarati poetry
  - Hindi poetry
  - Kannada poetry
  - Kashmiri poetry
  - Malayalam poetry
  - Marathi poetry
  - Meitei poetry (Manipuri poetry)
  - Nepali poetry
  - Rajasthani poetry
  - Sindhi poetry
  - Tamil poetry
  - Telugu poetry
  - Urdu poetry
  - Indian Poetry in English
- Pakistani poetry
  - Urdu poetry

==== East Asia ====
- Chinese poetry
- Japanese poetry
- Korean poetry
- Vietnamese poetry

==== Southeast Asia ====
- Javanese poetry
- Thai poetry
- Filipino poetry
- Singaporean Poetry
- Southeast asian poetry

=== Europe ===
- Albanian poetry
  - Albanian epic poetry
- Bosniak epic poetry
- British poetry
  - Cornish poetry
  - English poetry
    - Old English poetry
  - Manx poetry
  - Scottish poetry
  - Welsh poetry
    - Anglo-Welsh poetry
- Catalan poetry
- Finnish poetry
- French poetry
- German poetry
- Icelandic poetry
- Irish poetry
- Italian poetry
- List of Polish language poets
- Portuguese poetry
- Romanian poetry
- Russian poetry
- Bulgarian poetry
- Serbian epic poetry
- Slovak poetry
- Spanish poetry
- Ukrainian poetry

=== Americas ===
- Brazilian poetry
- Canadian poetry
- Latin American poetry
- Mexican poetry
- Peruvian poetry
- United States poetry
- Puerto Rican poetry

=== Africa ===
- Malagasy poetry
- South African poetry
- Swahili poetry

== Historical ==
- Rhapsode
- Rishi
- Sanskrit poetry
- Indian epic poetry
- Bard
- Skald
- Germanic poetry
- Old Norse poetry
- Biblical poetry
- Hebrew and Jewish epic poetry
- Ghazal
- Latin poetry

== See also ==
- Ethnopoetics
- Latin American poetry
