= Milman Parry =

American academic (1902–1935)

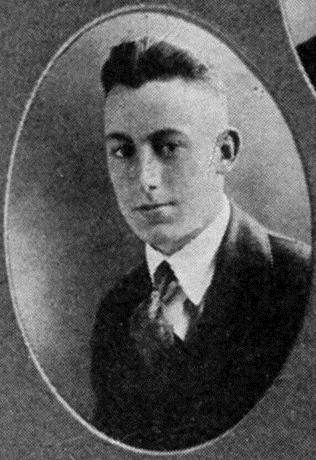
- Parry in his 1919 high school yearbook
- Born: June 23, 1902; Oakland, California, United States
- Died: December 3, 1935 (aged 33); Los Angeles, California, United States
- Spouse: Marian Thanhouser (Parry)
- Children: Marian and Adam Parry

Academic background
- Education: University of California, Berkeley; University of Paris

Academic work
- Discipline: Classical studies Linguistics
- Sub-discipline: Epic poetry Homeric scholarship Oral-formulaic composition
- Institutions: Harvard University
- Influenced: Albert Lord

Milman Parry (June 23, 1902 – December 3, 1935) was an American Classicist. A pioneer in the study of oral tradition, his theories on the origin of Homeric epics have revolutionized Homeric studies to such a fundamental degree that he has been described as the "Darwin of Homeric studies".

== Early life and education ==
Parry was born in 1902 in Oakland, California. He grew up in a house full of books, with a father who was self-taught and widely read. He and his siblings often recited poems from memory as a game.

He graduated from Oakland Technical High School in 1919, and studied at the University of California, Berkeley (B.A. and M.A.) where he became proficient in ancient Greek and the Classics. He then studied for a PhD at the Sorbonne in Paris and was a student of the linguist Antoine Meillet.

In his dissertations, which were published in French in 1928, Parry demonstrated that the Homeric style is characterized by the extensive use of fixed expressions, or "formulas", adapted for expressing a given idea under the same metrical conditions. For example, "divine Odysseus", "many-counseled Odysseus", or "much-enduring divine Odysseus" had less to do with moving the story forward than with being in accordance with the amount of material to be fitted into the remainder of the hexameter verse. The oral nature of the poem was evident in the dependence on these devices, both as memory aids and to allow for easier improvisation. They were clues suggesting that the two Homeric epics were not the inventions of a single poet but had been gradually evolved in a long-standing tradition. As one scholar put it, "Parry never solved the Homeric Question [who was Homer]; he demonstrated that it was irrelevant".

Meillet introduced Parry to Matija Murko, who had worked on oral epic traditions in Yugoslavia and had made phonograph recordings of some performances.

== Academic career ==
In 1928–1929, Parry began his academic career as a Professor of Latin and Greek at Drake University. Between 1933 and 1935 Parry, at the time an assistant professor at Harvard University, made two visits to Yugoslavia, where he studied and recorded oral traditional poetry in Serbo-Croat with the help on his second visit of his assistant Albert Lord, and a native singer and fixer named Nikola Vujnović, who became essential to finding and communicating with other singers, known as the guslar. They worked in Bosnia, where literacy was lowest and the oral tradition was, in the term used by Parry and Lord, "purest". They made thousands of hours of recordings in remote mountain villages of illiterate farmers who sang epic songs of prodigious length from memory. Parry and Lord recorded on newly invented equipment, flat aluminum records instead of vinyl, custom made for the expedition, with only a five minute recording time. Discs were continually swapped with a special two-disc machine to create a single long recording, later transcribed. They also recorded conversations between guslari after it became apparent this was also part of the creative process that fertilized improvisation.

The "jewel of the collection" is The Wedding of Smailagić Meho by Avdo Međedović, "by far the most skillful and versatile performer whom Milman encountered". The song, ran up to some 13,000 lines and performed over five days, was the closest analogue to Homer in quality and quantity; Parry said one "has the overwhelming sense that, in some way, he is hearing Homer". Međedović boasted he knew longer songs.

In his American publications of the 1930s, Parry introduced the hypothesis that the formulaic structure of Homeric epic is to be explained as a characteristic feature of oral composition, the so-called Oral Formulaic Hypothesis. After Parry's death, the idea was championed by Albert Lord, most notably in The Singer of Tales (1960).

The musical part of his recordings made in Yugoslavia was later notated and published posthumously in the fifties by Béla Bartók, commissioned by Columbia University in 1942. This publication is provided with a long introduction by Bartók.

== Death and commemoration ==
When Parry returned to the United States in 1935, he learned that his wealthy mother-in-law had fallen in with some people who were exploiting her without her knowledge. During his field excursions in the Balkans, Parry carried a gun with him, and he packed one in his luggage for a visit to California with his wife for the purpose of aiding his mother-in-law. In the late afternoon of December 3, at the Palms Hotel in Los Angeles, Parry was dressing for a dinner with friends, while his wife was in another room. Accounts differ, but she either heard a muffled shot or Parry groaning, and found him shot in the heart. He died soon afterwards. Police detectives determined that the gun was fired accidentally as he was removing clothing from his luggage. The safety had not been set and the trigger had become entangled in a shirt, which bore gunpowder burns.

Various rumors circulated, including the ideas that Parry committed suicide because he was despondent over Harvard's failure to give him a permanent appointment, or that his wife killed him. Parry's daughter, Marian, believed for the rest of her life that her mother killed him, and pointed to her mother's insane fits and accusations of infidelity. Detailed examination of the evidence by classicist Steve Reece concurs with the contemporary official conclusion that Parry's death was accidental.

Parry's collected papers were published posthumously in The Making of Homeric Verse: The Collected Papers of Milman Parry, edited by his son Adam Parry (Oxford University Press, 1971). The Milman Parry collection of records and transcriptions of South Slavic heroic poetry is now in the Widener Library of Harvard University. The journal Oral Tradition is devoted to advancing Parry's work.

== Influence ==
According to Steve Reece, there is "an enormous body of literature on Parry’s intellectual legacy". His influence is evident in the work of later scholars who have argued that there was a fundamental break in institutional structure between Homeric Greece and Platonic Greece, a break characterized by the transition from an oral culture to a written culture. This line of thought holds that in Homeric society, oral poetry served as a record of institutional and cultural practices. This thesis is associated with Eric Havelock, who cites Parry. Havelock argues that the fixed expressions that Parry identified can be understood as mnemonic aids, which were vital to the well-being of society, given the importance of the information carried by the poetry.

== Personal life ==
Parry was married to Marian Thanhouser, who came from a German Jewish family, and endured antisemitic comments from some of her husband's colleagues. They had two children, Marian and Adam Parry (1928–1971). The latter was the chairman of Yale University's Classics Department, until his untimely death, together with his wife Anne Amory, in a motorbike accident.

== Publications ==
- Parry, M. (1928). L'Épithète traditionelle dans Homère: Essai sur un problème de style homérique [The Traditional Epithet in Homer] (PhD thesis). Paris: Sorbonne University. pp. 1–190 in The Making of Homeric Verse trans. from French by Adam Parry.
- Parry, M. (1928). Les Formules et la Metrique d'Ηοmère [Homeric Formulae and Homeric Metre] (PhD thesis). Paris: Sorbonne University. pp. 191–239 in The Making of Homeric Verse trans. from French by Adam Parry.
- Parry, M. (1928). "The Homeric Gloss: A Study in Word Sense". Transactions and Proceedings of the American Philological Association. 59: 233–247. doi:10.2307/282988. JSTOR 282988.
- Parry, M. (1929). "The Distinctive Character of Enjambement in Homeric Verse". Transactions and Proceedings of the American Philological Association. 60: 200–220. doi:10.2307/282817. JSTOR 282817.
- Parry, M. (1930). "Studies in the Epic Technique of Oral Verse-Making. I. Homer and Homeric Style". Harvard Studies in Classical Philology. 41: 73–147. doi:10.2307/310626. JSTOR 310626.
- Parry, M. (1932). "Studies in the Epic Technique of Oral Verse-Making. II. The Homeric Language as the Language of Oral Poetry". Harvard Studies in Classical Philology. 43: 1–50. doi:10.2307/310666. JSTOR 310666.
- Parry, M. (1933). "The Traditional Metaphor in Homer". Classical Philology. 28 (1): 30–43. doi:10.1086/361552. JSTOR 264243.
- Parry, M. (1933). "Whole Formulaic Verses in Greek and Southslavic Heroic Song". Transactions and Proceedings of the American Philological Association. 64: 179–197. doi:10.2307/283165. JSTOR 283165.
- Parry, M. (1934). "The Traces of the Digamma in Ionic and Lesbian Greek". Language. 10 (2): 130–144. doi:10.2307/409604. JSTOR 409604.
- Parry, M. (1936). "On Typical Scenes in Homer (rev. of W. Arendt, Die typischen Szenen bei Homer)". Classical Philology. 31: 357–360. doi:10.1086/361967.
- Parry, M. (1937). "About Winged Words". Classical Philology. 32 (1): 59–63. doi:10.1086/361980. JSTOR 265061.
- Parry, M. (1971). Parry, Adam (ed.). The Making of Homeric Verse: The Collected Papers of Milman Parry. Oxford University Press. ISBN 978-0198141815.

== See also ==
- People
  - Antoine Meillet
  - Albert Lord
  - John Miles Foley
  - Francis Peabody Magoun
- Ideas:
  - Oral-formulaic composition
  - Oral tradition
  - Oral poetry
