= Kosta Hörmann =

Konstantin (Kosta) Hörmann
- Born: 8 September 1850; Bjelovar
- Died: 16 November 1921 (aged 71); Vienna
- Burial place: Zentralfriedhof
- Occupations: Director, Folklorist and Publicist
- Notable work: "Narodne pjesne Muhamedovaca u Bosni i Hercegovini"

Konstantin (Kosta) Hörmann (8 September 1850 – 16 November 1921) was a museum director, folklorist and publicist of Bavarian descent who spent most of his career in Bosnia and Herzegovina under Austro-Hungarian administration. He was the founding director of the National Museum of Bosnia and Herzegovina in Sarajevo and the compiler of one of the earliest major collections of Bosnian Muslim oral poetry, Narodne pjesne Muhamedovaca u Bosni i Hercegovini ("Folk Songs of the Mohammedans in Bosnia and Herzegovina").

== Life and career ==
Hörmann was born on 8 September 1850 in Bjelovar, then in the Austrian Empire, into a family of Bavarian settlers. He attended an administrative training course for the Military Frontier (Grenzverwaltungskurs) in Vienna, which prepared officials for service in the Habsburg borderlands.

Between 1870 and 1878 Hörmann served first in the military, then in the civilian administrative service in Bjelovar and Zagreb. After the Austro-Hungarian occupation of Bosnia and Herzegovina in 1878 he accompanied General Josip Filipović as a civilian commissioner during the military campaign and was soon appointed government commissioner for the city of Sarajevo, later becoming a government counsellor in the provincial administration. From 1904 he headed the Political-Administrative Department of the Provincial Government in Sarajevo as section chief (odjelnim predstojnikom). On his retirement in 1910 he was given the honorary title of museum intendant of the National Museum. During the First World War he held the rank of lieutenant and was transferred to Belgrade. After the collapse of Austria-Hungary he lived in Vienna, where he died on 16 November 1921. He was buried in the cemetery Zentralfriedhof in Vienna.

== National Museum of Bosnia and Herzegovina and editorial work ==
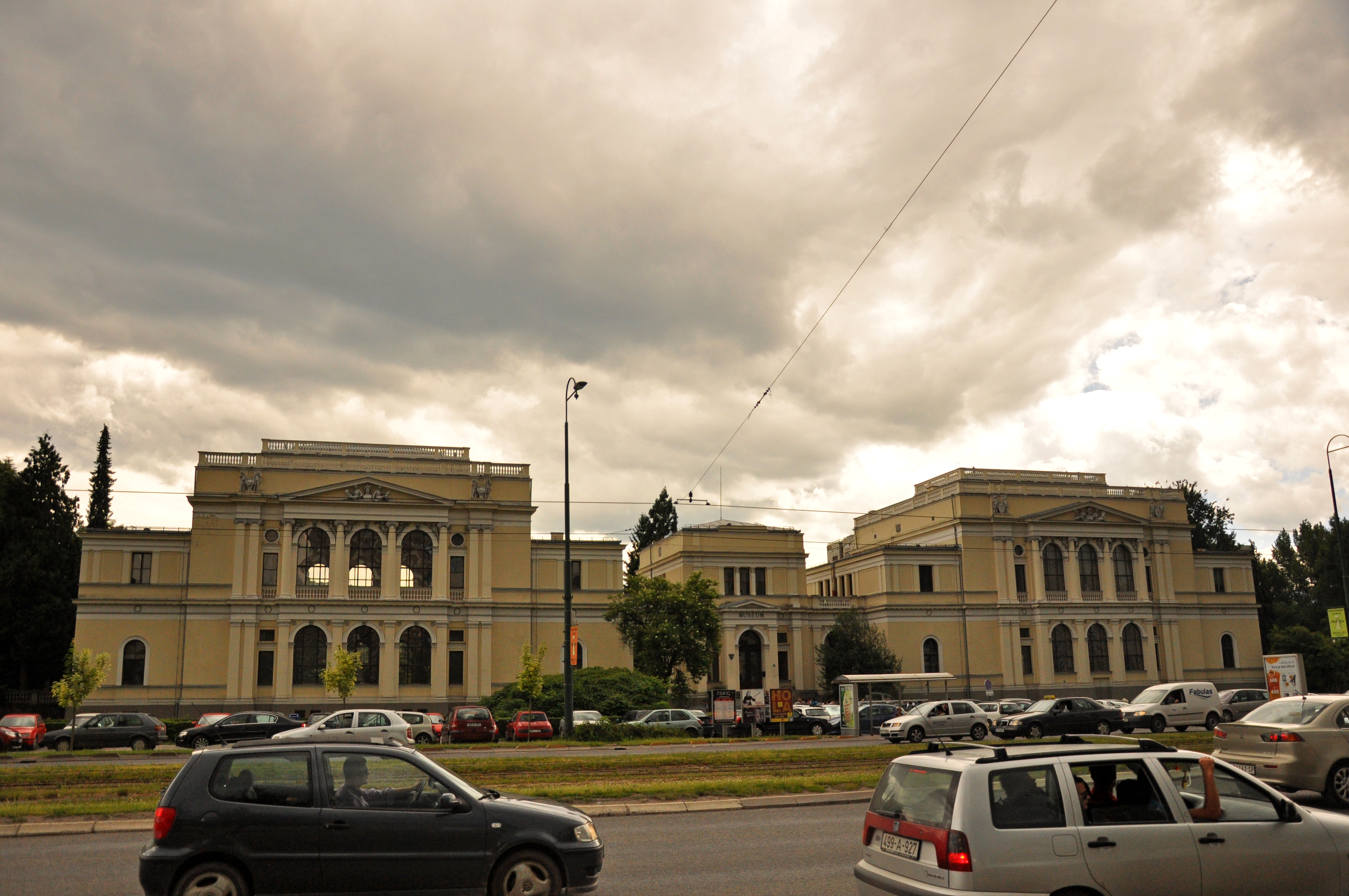
The National Museum of Bosnia and Herzegovina

From 1884 Hörmann was involved in preparations for the establishment of a provincial museum in Bosnia and Herzegovina. The Museum Society (Muzejsko društvo) was founded in Sarajevo, and on 1 February 1888 the Provincial Government formally established the National Museum of Bosnia and Herzegovina (then the Landesmuseum). Hörmann, at that time a government adviser, was appointed its first director.

He served as director from 1888 to 1904, playing a central role in shaping the institution's structure, collecting policy and research agenda. The statutes of the Museum Society envisaged a broad and, for its time, modern conception of the museum's activities, including archaeology, ethnology, natural history and history of art.

Under his leadership the museum collections expanded rapidly through fieldwork, purchases and donations, and the institution became an important centre for archaeological and ethnographic research in Bosnia and Herzegovina. Hörmann also helped organise major scholarly meetings in Sarajevo, including an archaeological congress in 1894 and an anthropological congress in 1895.

Hörmann founded the museum journal Glasnik Zemaljskog muzeja Bosne i Hercegovine ("Herald of the National Museum of Bosnia and Herzegovina") and served as its editor from 1889 to 1905. In the Glasnik and in the parallel German-language series Wissenschaftliche Mittheilungen aus Bosnien und der Hercegovina he published numerous articles, primarily in archaeology as well as in ethnography and folklore studies.

In 1895 he initiated the illustrated literary biweekly Nada, conceived as an official "supra-national" cultural periodical of the Bosnian provincial government, which he co-edited with the poet Silvije Strahimir Kranjčević until 1903. He also wrote on Bosnian and Herzegovinian literature for the multi-volume Austrian imperial survey Die Österreichisch-ungarische Monarchie in Wort und Bild.

Hörmann's career was closely tied to the cultural policy of the Austro-Hungarian administration in Bosnia and Herzegovina, particularly under the long-serving finance minister Béni Kállay, who advocated the construction of a distinct Bosnian territorial identity and language. Because he generally supported official policy, Hörmann was viewed in Serbian circles as an Austrian agent, while Croatian public opinion accepted him more cautiously, although he maintained close relations with Croatian intellectuals, assisted in the employment of Croats (especially teachers) in Bosnia and Herzegovina, and acted as a patron to writers such as Antun Gustav Matoš.

Beyond museum and journal work, Hörmann contributed articles to newspapers and periodicals such as Smotra dalmatinska, Hrvatski dnevnik, Narodna obrana, Nezavisnost, Südslavische Revue, Narodne novine and Balkan.

As museum director, Hörmann contributed to archaeological fieldwork in Bosnia and Herzegovina and reported on excavations such as those at Mogorjelo, later presented at the archaeological congress in Kiev in 1899. He also published a brochure in Paris in 1900, Achat et enlèvement de fiancées en Bosnie-Herzégovine, devoted to Bosnian marriage customs, and wrote on Bosnian literature for encyclopedic works in Vienna.

Hörmann's career was closely tied to the cultural policy of the Austro-Hungarian administration in Bosnia and Herzegovina, particularly under the long-serving finance minister Béni Kállay, who advocated the construction of a distinct Bosnian territorial identity and language. Because he generally supported official policy, Hörmann was viewed in Serbian circles as an Austrian agent, while Croatian public opinion accepted him more cautiously, although he maintained close relations with Croatian intellectuals, assisted in the employment of Croats (especially teachers) in Bosnia and Herzegovina, and acted as a patron to writers such as Antun Gustav Matoš.

The writer Ivo Andrić later depicted a figure based on Hörmann as a minor character in the story Priča o kmetu Simanu ("The Story of the Kmet Siman").

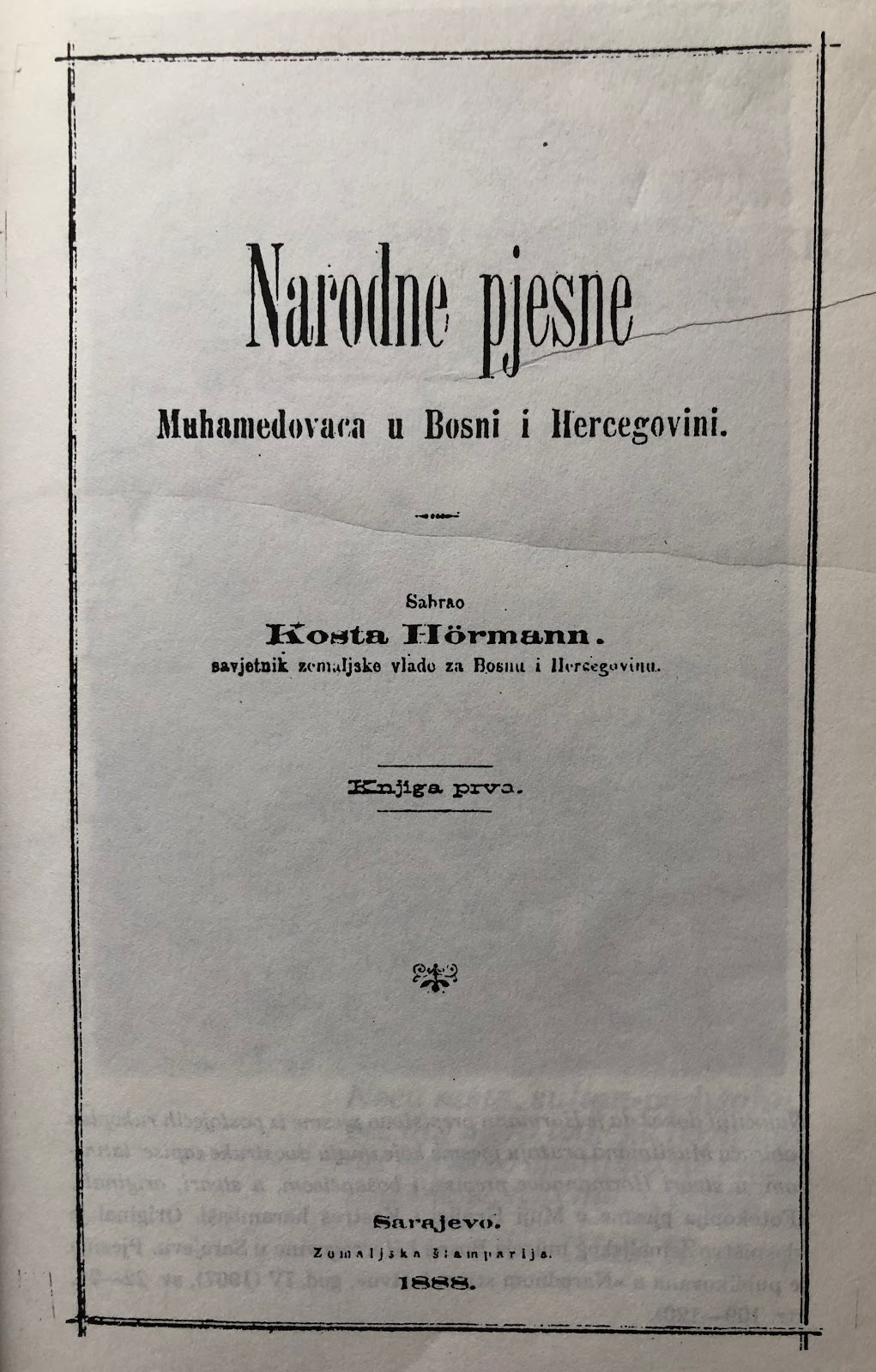
Narodne pjesne Muhamedovaca u Bosni i Hercegovini

== Folklore and ethnographic work ==
Hörmann's most important scholarly contribution lies in his collection and publication of Bosnian Muslim oral poetry. His two-volume anthology Narodne pjesne Muhamedovaca u Bosni i Hercegovini ("Folk Songs of the Mohammedans in Bosnia and Herzegovina"), published in Sarajevo by the Government Printing House in 1888 and 1889, contains 75 oral poems (mainly epic songs) recorded among Bosnian Muslims. The collection was widely reviewed in contemporary Croatian and Serbian scholarly journals and newspapers, where it received differing evaluations. Later assessments by folklorists such as Đenana Buturović have emphasised that Hörmann's anthology brought into print an authentic corpus of Bosnian Muslim epic poetry and that its literary and cultural-historical significance is considerable.

Hörmann did not publish the third volume he had announced. On the basis of manuscripts that were left in the museum, Buturović later prepared for a publication of further 44 songs, which appeared as Narodne pjesme Muslimana u Bosni i Hercegovini ("Folk Songs of Muslims in Bosnia and Herzegovina") in 1966. Critical and expanded editions of the collection have since been published under the titles Narodne pjesme Muslimana u Bosni i Hercegovini and Narodne pjesme Bošnjaka u Bosni i Hercegovini.

Besides folk songs, Hörmann wrote ethnographic papers on topics such as kinship and ritual kumstvo (godparenthood) among Bosnian Muslims, woodcarving, and popular beliefs, many of which were published in the Glasnik Zemaljskog muzeja.

== Selected works ==
- Narodne pjesne Muhamedovaca u Bosni i Hercegovini, vol. 1–2, Sarajevo: Zemaljska štamparija, 1888–1889. (later reissued as Narodne pjesme Muslimana u Bosni i Hercegovini, Sarajevo: J. Kušan, 1933; critical and expanded editions 1966, 1976, 1990 and 1996).
- Numerous articles on archaeology, ethnography and folklore in Glasnik Zemaljskog muzeja Bosne i Hercegovine and Wissenschaftliche Mittheilungen aus Bosnien und der Hercegovina.
- Achat et enlèvement de fiancées en Bosnie-Herzégovine (Paris, 1900).
- Articles on Bosnian and Herzegovinian literature in Die Österreichisch-ungarische Monarchie in Wort und Bild (Vienna, 1901).
