= Albert Lord =

American academic (1912–1991)

- Born: September 15, 1912; Boston, Massachusetts, U.S.
- Died: July 29, 1991 (aged 78); Cambridge, Massachusetts, U.S.
- Education: Boston Latin School
- Alma mater: Harvard University (PhD, 1949)
- Known for: research on epic poetry The Singer of Tales
- Spouse: Mary Louise Carlson
- Children: 2 sons
- Scientific career
- Academic advisors: Milman Parry

Albert Bates Lord (15 September 1912 – 29 July 1991) was a professor of Slavic and comparative literature at Harvard University who carried on Milman Parry's research on epic poetry after Parry's death.

== Early life ==
Lord was born in Boston, Massachusetts. He graduated from Boston Latin School in 1930 and attended Harvard College, where he received an A.B. in classics in 1934 and a Ph.D. in comparative literature in 1949.

== Career ==
Lord became a professor of Slavic and comparative literature at Harvard in 1950. He was later promoted as a full professor there in Classics. He also founded Harvard's Committee on Degrees in Folklore and Mythology, and chaired the college's Department of Folklore and Mythology until his retirement in 1983.

Lord authored the book The Singer of Tales, first published in 1960. It was reissued in a 40th anniversary edition, with an audio compact disc to aid in the understanding of the recorded renditions discussed in the text. His wife Mary Louise Lord completed and edited his manuscript of a posthumous sequel The Singer Resumes the Tale (published 1995) which further supports and extends Lord's initial conclusions.

Lord demonstrated the ways in which various great ancient epics from Europe and Asia were heirs to a tradition not only of oral performance, but of oral composition. He argued strongly for a complete divide between the non-literate authors of the Homeric epics and the scribes who later wrote them down. Lord studied and made field recordings of South-Slavic heroic epics sung to the gusle, most notable of poets he worked with was Avdo Međedović, whose most notable song was The Wedding of Smailagić Meho. He studied not only Homeric epics, but also Beowulf, Gilgamesh, and others. Across these many story traditions he found strong commonalities concerning the oral composition of traditional storytelling.

== Personal life ==
His wife, Mary Louise Lord née Carlson, taught classics at Connecticut College; they had two children. Lord died in July 1991 at Cambridge, Massachusetts.

== Awards and distinctions ==
- 1940 - Junior Fellow - Harvard Society of Fellows
- 1949 - Awarded a Guggenheim Fellowship
- 1956 - Fellow - American Academy of Arts and Sciences
- 1959 - Honorary Curator - Milman Parry Collection - Widener Library - Harvard College
- 1969 - Fellow - American Folklore Society
- 1972 - Becomes the Arthur Kingsley Porter Professor of Slavic and Comparative Literature - Harvard University
- 1988 - Recipient of the Yugoslav Star - Yugoslav Consulate
- 1990 - Awarded an honorary doctorate from the University of Novi Sad

== Bibliography ==
=== By Lord ===
- Albert B. Lord, Bela Bartok, Serbo-Croatian Folk Songs (New York, 1951)
- Albert B. Lord, Serbo-Croatian Heroic Songs, vols. 1 & 2 (Cambridge & Belgrade, 1953–4), vols. 3 & 4, with David E. Bynum (1975)
- Albert B. Lord, Beginning Serbocroatian (The Hague: Mouton & Co., 1958)
- Albert B. Lord, The Singer of Tales (Cambridge, MA: Harvard Univ. Press, 1960)
- Albert B. Lord, Umbundu: Folk Tales from Angola (Boston, 1962)
- Albert B. Lord, David E. Bynum, Beginning Bulgarian (The Hague, 1962)
- Albert B. Lord, A Bulgarian Literary Reader (Cambridge, 1962)
- Albert B. Lord, The Wedding of Smailagic Meho (Cambridge, 1974)
- Albert B. Lord, Bela Bartók, ed. Benjamin Suchoff, Yugoslav Folk Music (Albany, NY, 1978)
- Albert B. Lord, Serbo-Croatian Folk Songs and Instrumental Pieces from the Milman Parry Collection (Albany, NY, 1978)
- Albert B. Lord, ed. John Miles Foley Festschrift: Oral Traditional Literature: A Festschrift for Albert Bates Lord, (Columbus, OH, 1981)
- Albert B. Lord, "Perspectives on Recent Work on the Oral Traditional Formula," in Oral Tradition, vol. 1, no. 3 (1986), pp. 467–503
- Albert B. Lord, "Characteristics of Orality," in A Festschrift for Walter J. Ong, S.J., a special issue of Oral Tradition, vol. 2, no. 1 (1987), pp. 54–72
- Albert B. Lord, Epic Singers and Oral Tradition (Ithaca, NY: Cornell Univ. Press, 1991)
- Albert B. Lord, "Oral Composition and 'Oral Residue' in the Middle Ages", in Oral Tradition in the Middle Ages, ed. W. F. H. Nicolaisen (Binghamton, NY: Medieval & Renaissance Texts & Studies, 1995), pp. 7–29

=== On Lord ===
- John Miles Foley, "Albert Bates Lord (1912-1991): An Obituary," in Journal of American Folklore 105 (1992), pp. 57–65.
- "Albert Bates Lord, 78, Scholar of Folk Tales," New York Times, August 3, 1991.
- Morgan E. Grey, Mary Louise Lord, and John Miles Foley, "A Bibliography of Publications by Albert Bates Lord," in Oral Tradition, vol. 25, no. 2 (2010), pp. 497–504.
