= Friedrich Salomon Krauss =

Croatian-Austrian Jewish sexologist and ethnographer (1859-1938)

Friedrich Salomon Krauss (7 October 1859 – 29 May 1938) was a Croatian-Austrian Jewish sexologist, ethnographer, folklorist, and Slavist.

== Early life ==
Krauss was born in Požega, Croatia, at the time Kingdom of Hungary. In 1877–78, he attended the University of Vienna.

== Career ==
One of his first publications was a translation of Artemidoros' of Daldis Interpretation of Dreams, which was cited in Sigmund Freud's book The Interpretation of Dreams. He began his career as a folklorist and ethnologist.

In 1884–85, Krauss received funding from the Crown Prince Rudolf to gather folklore and ballads of the Guslar singers in Bosnia, Croatia and Herzegovina. As a result of this field research, he published a two-volume collection of fairytales, Sagen und Märchen der Südslaven.

Perhaps his most famous work was the Anthropophytia (1904–1913), a scholarly yearbook which published folklore of erotic and sexual content. In alliance with the growing psychoanalytic movement, Krauss and his colleagues felt that sexual folklore, which was generally purged from all published collections by scholars, could provide valuable information about a culture and society. He was a correspondent of Freud and used the term paraphilia to describe certain deviant sexual practices.

His research in the field of sexuality led to some conflict. In 1913, Anthropophytia was banned and Krauss was brought to trial in Berlin as a pornographer. He was convicted, which caused him a large financial loss and hurt his reputation.

Krauss lived and worked as a writer, private scholar, and translator in Vienna, Austria. His translations include Scatalogic Rites of All Nations by John Gregory Bourke. He was an elected International Member of the American Philosophical Society. He died in Vienna.

== See also ==
- List of people from Vienna

== Bibliography ==
- Raymond L. Burt: F. S. Krauss (1859–1938): Selbstzeugnisse und Materialien zur Bibliographie des Volkskundlers, Literaten und Sexualforschers (1990) ISBN 3-7001-1693-4
- Peter Horwath & Miroljub Jokovic: "Friedrich Salomo Krauss (1859–1938)" (Novi Sad 1992) ISBN 86-901345-2-2
- Krauss, Friedrich Salomo: "Volkserzählungen der Südslaven: Märchen und Sagen, Schwänke, Schnurren und erbauliche Geschichten" Burt, Raymond L. (Hrsg.); Puchner, Walter (Hrsg.) Wien 2002 ISBN 3-205-99457-4
- Wolfgang Jacobeit u.a. (Hg.): Völkische Wissenschaft. Gestalten und Tendenzen der deutschen und österreichischen Volkskunde in der ersten Hälfte des 20. Jahrhunderts. (Wien 1984)
