= Montenegro–Serbia border =

The border between Montenegro and Serbia starts in the West at the tripoint with Bosnia and Herzegovina and continues eastward to the tripoint with Kosovo. From here the status of the border is subject to dispute: While Montenegro recognizes the independence of Kosovo, Serbia maintains that this is not the case and by this definition the border would continue onward in a southerly directio until hitting the tripoint between Kosovo, Albania and North Macedonia near Restelica/Restelicë. Depending on the definition the border between Montenegro and Serbia is either 170 km (110 mi) or 249 km (155 mi).

== Border crossings ==
There are currently 4 functioning border crossings between the two countries. The following is a table of the crossing points, listed from North to South:

(Montenegro) Montenegrin checkpoint	Municipality	(Serbia) Serbian checkpoint	District	Route in Montenegro	Route in Serbia	Status
Čemerno	Pljevlja	Čemerno	Zlatibor	local road	M-182	passengers
Rance	Pljevlja	Jabuka	Zlatibor			passengers and goods
Dobrakovo	Bijelo Polje Municipality	Gostun	Zlatibor			passengers and goods
Vuča	Rožaje	Godovo	Raška	local road	M-205	passengers
Dračenovac	Rožaje	Špiljani	Raška			passengers and goods

The crossings at Kula/Kukin one the road between Rožaje and Peć and at Kućište/Kuçishtë on the road between Plav and Peć is not controlled by the Republic of Serbia.
