= Dobrinje =

Dobrinje may refer to:

- Dobrinje, Visoko, Bosnia and Herzegovina
- Dobrinje, Montenegro
- Dobrinje (Tutin), Serbia
- Dobrinje, or Krivaja, a monastery associated with the Church of the Transfiguration, Krivaja, Šabac, Serbia

== See also ==
- Dobrinja (disambiguation)
