= Miodrag Bulatović =

Serbian writer (1930–1991)

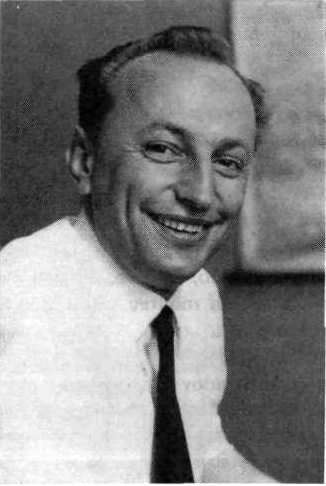
- Bulatović in 1969
- Born: 20 February 1930; Okladi, Zeta Banovina, Kingdom of Yugoslavia
- Died: 15 March 1991 (aged 61); Igalo, SR Montenegro, SFR Yugoslavia
- Resting place: Belgrade New Cemetery
- Education: University of Belgrade Faculty of Philosophy
- Occupation: Novelist

Miodrag Bulatović (Serbian Cyrillic: Миодраг Булатовић; 20 February 1930 – 15 March 1991) was a Serbian writer, novelist, journalist and playwright.

== Biography ==
Bulatović began in 1956 with a book of short stories, Djavoli dolaze ("The Devils Are Coming", translated as Stop the Danube), for which he received the Serbian Writers Union Award. His novel The Red Rooster Flies Heavenwards, set in his homeland of northeastern Montenegro, was translated into more than twenty foreign languages. He then stopped publishing for a time, to protest against state interference in his work.

His next novel, Hero on a Donkey, "A dark hot nightmare of a war novel...", was first published abroad and only four years later (1967) in Yugoslavia.

Common themes in his works are demons, evil, the grotesque, and black humor.

In 1975, Bulatović won the NIN Award for novel of the year for People with Four Fingers, an insight into the émigré's life. The Fifth Finger was a sequel to that book. His last novel was Gullo Gullo, which brought together various themes from his previous books.

A library in Rakovica is named after him.

Bulatović was known "for his fierce Serbian nationalism, which earned him the enmity of other ethnic groups in Yugoslavia, and he was an official of Serbia's Socialist Party." His candidature for the President of the Association of Writers of Yugoslavia in 1986 was rejected by Slovenian, Kosovan, Montenegrin and Croatian branches of the Association contributing to the subsequent dissolution of the Association in 1989.

== Works ==
- Stop the Danube (Djavoli dolaze, 1956)
- The Wolf and the Bell (Vuk i zvono, 1958)
- The Red Rooster Flies Heavenwards (Crveni petao leti prema nebu, 1959)
- Hero on a Donkey (Heroj na magarcu, 1965)
- Godot has Arrived (Godo je došao, 1966)
- The War Was Better (Rat je bio bolji, 1968)
- People with Four Fingers (Ljudi sa četiri prsta, 1975)
- The Fifth Finger (Peti prst, 1977)
- Gullo gullo (1981)
- Death's Lover - a series of articles in Politika newspaper (Ljubavnik smrti, 1990)

== See also ==
- Gruban Malić

== Notes ==
1. Okladi was then a village near Bijelo Polje and is now part of Bijelo Polje Municipality in Montenegro.
