= Stubo =

Stubo may refer to:

- Stubo, Montenegro
- Stubo (Valjevo), Serbia

== See also ==
- Stubø, a surname
