= Kostenica =

Kostenica may refer to:

- Kostenica, Montenegro
- Kostenica (Prokuplje), Serbia
