= Orahovac =

Orahovac may refer to:

- Orahovac, Kosovo, a town and municipality in western Kosovo
- Orahovac (liqueur), a Dalmatian walnut liqueur; see Croatian cuisine
- Donji Orahovac, Trebinje, Bosnia and Herzegovina
- Donji Orahovac, Kotor, Montenegro
- Gornji Orahovac, a village near Trebinje, Bosnia and Herzegovina
- Orahovac, a South Slavic surname. Notable people with the name include:
  - Petar Orahovac (born 1857), Bulgarian doctor and public figure
  - Dimitar Orahovac (born 1892), Bulgarian medical physiologist
  - Adnan Orahovac (born 1991), Montenegrin football player
  - Nina Berova-Orahovac (1859–1945), Bessarabian-Bulgarian woman physician
  - Sait Orahovac (1909–1992), Bosniak writer and folklorist
  - Sanibal Orahovac (born 1978), Montenegrin football player
