= Krš =

Krš may refer to:

- Karst, a landscape formed from the dissolution of soluble rocks
- Krš, Croatia, a village near Perušić
- Krš, Žabljak a village in Žabljak Municipality, Montenegro

== See also ==
- Femića Krš, a village in Bijelo Polje Municipality, Montenegro
