= Barice =

Barice may refer to:

Bosnia and Herzegovina

- Barice, Donji Vakuf
- Barice, Stari Grad

Montenegro

- Barice, Montenegro

Serbia

- Barice, Plandište
