= Resnik, Montenegro =

Resnik Ресник
- Town
- Location within Montenegro
- Coordinates: 43°02′17″N 19°46′19″E
- Country: Montenegro
- Municipality: Bijelo Polje

Population (2011)
  - Total: 2,967
- Time zone: UTC+1 (CET)
  - Summer (DST): UTC+2 (CEST)

Resnik (Montenegrin: Ресник) is a village in the municipality of Bijelo Polje, Montenegro.

== Demographics ==
According to the 2003 census, it has a population of 2,739 people. It is practically merged with nearby Rasovo, and together make a suburb of the town of Bijelo Polje.

According to the 2011 census, its population was 2,967.

Ethnicity in 2011
Ethnicity	Number	Percentage
Bosniaks	1,208	40.7%
Serbs	702	23.7%
Montenegrins	242	8.2%
Croats	7	0.2%
other/undeclared	808	27.2%
Total	2,967	100%
