= Boturići =

Boturići may refer to:

- Boturići, Montenegro
- Boturići, Serbia
