= Dubovo =

Dubovo may refer to:

Bosnia and Herzegovina

- Dubovo Brdo

Moldova

- Dubău, a commune in Transnistria

Montenegro

- Dubovo, Bijelo Polje

Russia

- Dubovo, Vladimir Oblast

Serbia

- Dubovo (Tutin)
- Dubovo (Žitorađa)

== See also ==
- Dubova (disambiguation)
