= Rakonje =

Rakonje Ракоње
- Village
- Location within Montenegro
- Country: Montenegro
- Municipality: Bijelo Polje

Population (2011)
  - Total: 2,291
- Time zone: UTC+1 (CET)
  - Summer (DST): UTC+2 (CEST)

Rakonje (Montenegrin and Serbian Cyrillic: Ракоње) is a village in the municipality of Bijelo Polje, Montenegro.

== Demographics ==
According to the 2003 census, the village had a population of 792 people.

According to the 2011 census, its population was 2,291.

Ethnicity in 2011
Ethnicity	Number	Percentage
Serbs	992	43.3%
Montenegrins	603	26.3%
Bosniaks	268	11.7%
Roma	173	7.6%
other/undeclared	255	11.1%
Total	2,291	100%
