= Rokita (disambiguation) =

Rokita is a Polish surname.

Rokita may also refer to:

- Rokita, West Pomeranian Voivodeship, a settlement in Poland
- Rokyta, Stara Vyzhivka Raion, a village in Ukraine
- Rokita (folklore), a devil in Polish folklore

== See also ==
- Rakita (disambiguation)
- Rokyta (disambiguation)
