= Jablanovo =

Jablanovo Ябланово
- Village
- Location within Montenegro
- Country: Montenegro
- Municipality: Bijelo Polje

Population (2011)
  - Total: 54
- Time zone: UTC+1 (CET)
  - Summer (DST): UTC+2 (CEST)

Jablanovo (Montenegrin and Serbian Cyrillic: Јабланово) is a small village in the municipality of Bijelo Polje, Montenegro. It is located close to the Serbian border.

== Demographics ==
According to the 2003 census, the village had a population of 58 people.

According to the 2011 census, its population was 54.

Ethnicity in 2011
Ethnicity	Number	Percentage
Serbs	38	70.4%
Bosniaks	16	29.6%
Total	54	100%
