= Mirojevići =

- Village
- Location within Montenegro
- Country: Montenegro
- Municipality: Bijelo Polje

Population (2011)
  - Total: 208
- Time zone: UTC+1 (CET)
  - Summer (DST): UTC+2 (CEST)

Mirojevići (Montenegrin Cyrillic: Миројевићи) is a village in the municipality of Bijelo Polje, Montenegro.

== Demographics ==
According to the 2003 census, the village had a population of 295 people.

According to the 2011 census, its population was 208.

Ethnicity in 2011
Ethnicity	Number	Percentage
Bosniaks	98	47.1%
Serbs	31	14.9%
Montenegrins	6	2.9%
other/undeclared	142	40.0%
Total	208	100%
