= Srđevac =

- Village
- Location within Montenegro
- Country: Montenegro
- Municipality: Bijelo Polje

Population (2011)
  - Total: 255
- Time zone: UTC+1 (CET)
  - Summer (DST): UTC+2 (CEST)

Srđevac (Montenegrin and Serbian Cyrillic: Срђевац) is a village in the municipality of Bijelo Polje, Montenegro.

== Demographics ==
According to the 2003 census, the village had a population of 337 people.

According to the 2011 census, its population was 255.

Ethnicity in 2011
Ethnicity	Number	Percentage
Bosniaks	101	39.6%
Serbs	36	14.1%
Montenegrins	35	13.7%
other/undeclared	83	32.5%
Total	255	100%
