= Sipanje =

- Village
- Location within Montenegro
- Country: Montenegro
- Municipality: Bijelo Polje

Population (2011)
  - Total: 126
- Time zone: UTC+1 (CET)
  - Summer (DST): UTC+2 (CEST)

Sipanje (Montenegrin Cyrillic: Сипање) is a village in the municipality of Bijelo Polje, Montenegro.

== Demographics ==
According to the 2003 census, the village had a population of 138 people.

According to the 2011 census, its population was 126.

Ethnicity in 2011
Ethnicity	Number	Percentage
Bosniaks	84	66.7%
Montenegrins	9	7.1%
other/undeclared	33	26.2%
Total	126	100%
