= Lješnica, Bijelo Polje =

Lješnica Љешница
- Village
- Location within Montenegro
- Country: Montenegro
- Municipality: Bijelo Polje

Population (2011)
  - Total: 1,546
- Time zone: UTC+1 (CET)
  - Summer (DST): UTC+2 (CEST)

Lješnica (Montenegrin and Serbian Cyrillic: Љешница) is a village in the municipality of Bijelo Polje, Montenegro.

== Demographics ==
According to the 2003 census, the village had a population of 1,270 people.

According to the 2011 census, its population was 1,546.

Ethnicity in 2011
Ethnicity	Number	Percentage
Serbs	947	61.3%
Montenegrins	488	31.6%
Bosniaks	12	0.8%
other/undeclared	99	6.4%
Total	1,546	100%
