= Ostrelj =

Ostrelj may refer to:

- Ostrelj, Montenegro, a village in Bijelo Polje Municipality, in northern Montenegro
- Oštrelj, a village in the municipality of Bor, in Serbia
