= Mioče =

Mioče may refer to:

- Mioče (Rudo), a village in Rudo, Bosnia and Herzegovina
- Mioče, Bijelo Polje, Montenegro
