= Laholo =

- Village
- Location within Montenegro
- Country: Montenegro
- Municipality: Bijelo Polje

Population (2011)
  - Total: 97
- Time zone: UTC+1 (CET)
  - Summer (DST): UTC+2 (CEST)

Laholo (Montenegrin Cyrillic: Журена) is a village in the municipality of Bijelo Polje, Montenegro.

== Demographics ==
According to the 2003 census, the village had a population of 263 people.

According to the 2011 census, its population was 97.

Ethnicity in 2011
| Ethnicity | Number | Percentage |
|---|---|---|
| Bosniaks | 46 | 47.4% |
| Serbs | 24 | 24.7% |
| other/undeclared | 27 | 27.8% |
| Total | 97 | 100% |
