= Avdo Međedović =

Yugoslav poet and singer (died 1955)

- Born: c. 1870–1875; Obrov, Sanjak of Novi Pazar, Ottoman Empire
- Died: 1955 (aged c. 80–85); Bijelo Polje, SR Montenegro, Yugoslavia
- Occupations: guslar (gusle player and oral poet)
- Writing career
- Genre: Epic poetry
- Notable work: The Wedding of Meho Smailagić

Avdo Međedović (c. 1875 – 1955) was a Bosniak guslar (gusle player and oral poet) from Montenegro. He was the most versatile and skillful performer of all those encountered, in the Bosnia and Herzegovina and Montenegro region, during the 1930s, by Milman Parry and Albert Lord during their research on the oral epic tradition.

== Importance ==
During Milman Parry's field research in the Balkans (regarding the Homeric question), at Milman Parry's request Avdo sang songs he already knew, and in addition Avdo sang some songs he just heard in front of Parry (which were ostensibly not previously known to Avdo). This convinced Parry that someone Homer-like could produce a poem so long. Avdo dictated, over five days, a version of the well-known theme The Wedding of Meho Smailagić that was 12,323 lines long, saying on the fifth day to Nikola (Parry's assistant on the journey) that he knew even longer songs. On another occasion, he sang over several days an epic of 13,331 lines. He said he had several others of similar length in his repertoire. In Parry's first tour, over 80,000 lines were transcribed.

Many years afterward The Wedding was published in 1974 by Lord with a parallel English translation. Avdo Međedović died in 1955 in Yugoslavia. Albert Lord wrote after his death that "it may well be that he was the last of the truly great epic singers of the Balkan Slavic tradition".

== Early life ==
He was born into Bosniak Muslim family in the village of Obrov, near Bijelo Polje (now in Montenegro) in 1875, while it was a part of the Ottoman Empire. His family had Serbian Orthodox ancestry, being related to the Rovčani tribe and coming from Nikšić, having been converted in the past centuries, though Avdo himself did not know when or why the family converted to Islam. He worked as a butcher in his teens, as his father and brother were butchers. After two years there he joined the army, where he served at various locations and in different positions; he spent three years on the Bulgarian border, and was then sent to an officer's school in Salonica; he recalled saying that he "rotted for a year and emerged a sergeant". After seven years he returned home, but was soon recalled to join the army again and served a year and a half.

During his second tour with the army, Međedović was wounded and spent 45 days in a hospital; while one bullet was removed, another remained in his arm. Two years after, he got a small farm in Obrov and married; in accordance with custom, he did not know the girl prior to the wedding. At that time he was 29 years old, and they had three sons.

Međedović was illiterate his whole life. It is unclear what his mother tongue was; while he spoke Serbo-Croatian, it was not his first language. He learned Turkish in the army and also knew some Albanian.

== Poetry ==
He was the most versatile and skillful performer of all those encountered by Milman Parry and Albert Lord during their research on the oral epic tradition of Bosnia and Herzegovina and Montenegro in the 1930s. Parry recorded epic songs sung by Međedović in July and August 1935. Lord writes that "Avdo had a repertory of fifty-eight epics; Parry recorded nine of these on phonograph discs and Nikola Vujnović, Parry’s assistant, wrote down four others from Avdo's dictation."

Conversations with Avdo were also recorded, "499 discs on both sides, or nearly one-seventh of the 3,584 twelve-inch records in the entire Parry Collection from the 1930s".

Albert Lord, who worked with Parry as a student in 1935, returned to Avdo in 1950–51; he recorded three more songs. Lord notes that "Avdo could sing songs of about the length of Homer’s Odyssey. An illiterate butcher in a small town of the central Balkans was equaling Homer’s feat, at least in regard to length of song."

The origins of two of Avdo's songs are known. He learned "The Wedding of Meho" from his friend, who read the poem to him five or six times from a printed source. Despite this, Avdo's oral version is very different from original published one, and much more descriptive:

It had been written down in 1885 by F. S. Krauss from an eighty-five-year old singer named Ahmed Isakov Šemić in Rotimlje, Hercegovina, and had been published in Dubrovnik in 1886. It was later reprinted, with minor changes in dialect, in cheap paper editions in Sarajevo, without notes and introduction. In this form it was read to Avdo. Krauss’s text has 2,160 lines; Avdo’s in 1935 had 12,323 lines and in 1950, 8,488 lines. ... The opening scene of "The Wedding of Meho, Son of Smail" is an assembly of the lords of the Turkish Border in the city of Kanidža. In Krauss’s published version this assembly occupies 141 lines; Avdo’s text has 1,053 lines.

Avdo learned from many men, firstly from his father Ćor Huso Husein of Kolašin "whose reputation seems to have been prodigious". Lord mentions that though Avdo had a great endurance and mastery as a poet, "his voice was not especially good. He was hoarse, and the goiter on the left side of his neck could not have helped." in 1935 Lord asked Međedović to recall a song he heard only once, for this he asked another guslar, Mumin Vlahovljak of Plevlja, to sing his song "Bećiragić Meho", unknown to Međedović. After he heard the song of 2,294 lines, he sang it himself, but made it almost three times longer, 6,313 lines.

Recorded by Parry in 1935

- "The Death of Mustajbey of the Lika" (2,436 lines)
- "Hrnjica Mujo Avenges the Death of Mustajbey of the Lika" (6,290 lines)
- "The Wedding of Vlahinjić Alija" (Ženidba Vlahinjić Alije) (6,042 lines; "a dictated version of this song" is slightly different: 5,883 lines)
- "The Heroism of Đerđelez Alija" (Junaštvo Đerzelez Alije) (2,624 lines).
- "Osmanbey Delibegović and Pavičević Luka" (13,331 lines)
- "Sultan Selim Captures Kandija" (5,919 lines)
- "The Illness of Emperor Dušan in Prizren" (645 lines)
- "The Captivity of Kara Omeragha" (1,302 lines)
- "Bećiragić Meho" (6,313 lines)

Dictated in 1935

- "The Arrival of the Vizier in Travnik" (7,621 lines)
- "The Wedding of Meho, Son of Smail" (Ženidba Smailagić Meha) (12,311 lines)
- "Gavran Harambaša and Sirdar Mujo" (4,088 lines)
- "The Captivity of Tale of Orašac in Ozim" (3,738 lines, unfinished)

Recorded by Lord 1950–51

- "Osmanbey Delilbegović and Pavičević Luka" (6,119 lines)
- "The Wedding of Meho, Son of Smail" (8,488 lines)
- "Bećiragić Meho" (3,561 lines)

== Sources ==
- Lord, Albert Bates (1956). "Avdo Međedović, Guslar". The Journal of American Folklore. 69 (273): 320–330. doi:10.2307/537148. JSTOR 537148.
- Lord, Albert B. (2019) [1st ed.: 1960]. Elmer, David F. (ed.). The Singer of Tales (3rd ed.). Cambridge, Massachusetts: Harvard University Press. ISBN 9780674975736.
- Lord, Albert Bates; Bynum, David E., eds. (1974). Avdo Međedović. The Wedding of Smailagić Meho. Translated by Lord, Albert Bates. Cambridge, Massachusetts: Harvard University Press. ISBN 9780674801639.
- Lord, Albert Bates (1991). "4. Avdo Međedović, Guslar". Epic Singers and Oral Tradition. Ithaca and London: Cornell University Press.
- Parry, Milman (1971). Parry, Adam (ed.). The making of Homeric verse. The collected papers of Milman Parry. Oxford: Clarendon Press. ISBN 9780198141815.
