= Jagoče, Montenegro =

Jagoče
- Village
- Location within Montenegro
- Coordinates: 42°58′00″N 19°53′20″E
- Country: Montenegro
- Municipality: Bijelo Polje

Population (2011)
  - Total: 95
- Time zone: UTC+1 (CET)
  - Summer (DST): UTC+2 (CEST)

Jagoče (Montenegrin and Serbian Cyrillic: Јагоче) is a small village in the municipality of Bijelo Polje, Montenegro.

== Demographics ==
According to the 2003 census, the village had a population of 12 people.

According to the 2011 census, its population was 95.

Ethnicity in 2011
Ethnicity	Number	Percentage
Serbs	52	54.7%
Bosniaks	17	17.9%
Montenegrins	16	16.8%
other/undeclared	10	10.5%
Total	95	100%
