= Gubavač =

Gubavač Губавач
- Village
- Location within Montenegro
- Country: Montenegro
- Municipality: Bijelo Polje

Population (2011)
  - Total: 354
- Time zone: UTC+1 (CET)
  - Summer (DST): UTC+2 (CEST)

Gubavač (Montenegrin Cyrillic: Губавач) is a village in the municipality of Bijelo Polje, Montenegro.

== Demographics ==
According to the 2003 census, the village had a population of 550 people.

According to the 2011 census, its population was 354.

Ethnicity in 2011
| Ethnicity | Number | Percentage |
|---|---|---|
| Bosniaks | 305 | 86.2% |
| Montenegrins | 6 | 1.7% |
| other/undeclared | 43 | 12.1% |
| Total | 354 | 100% |
