= Ivanje =

Ivanje may refer to:

- Ivanje, Bijelo Polje, a village in Montenegro
- Ivanje, Bojnik, a village in Serbia
- Ivanje, Croatia, a village on Cres
- Ivanje (Prijepolje), a village in Prijepolje, Serbia
