= Negobratina =

- Village
- Location within Montenegro
- Country: Montenegro
- Municipality: Bijelo Polje

Population (2011)
  - Total: 49
- Time zone: UTC+1 (CET)
  - Summer (DST): UTC+2 (CEST)

Negobratina (Montenegrin: Негобратина) is a village in the municipality of Bijelo Polje, Montenegro.

== Demographics ==
According to the 2003 census, the village had a population of 72 people.

According to the 2011 census, its population was 49.

Ethnicity in 2011
Ethnicity	Number	Percentage
Bosniaks	42	85.7%
other/undeclared	7	14.3%
Total	49	100%
