= Lijeska =

Lijeska may refer to:

- Lijeska, Bijelo Polje, Montenegro
- Lijeska, Pljevlja, Montenegro
