= Rastoka, Montenegro =

Rastoka
- Village
- Location within Montenegro
- Country: Montenegro
- Municipality: Bijelo Polje

Population (2011)
  - Total: 152
- Time zone: UTC+1 (CET)
  - Summer (DST): UTC+2 (CEST)

Rastoka (Montenegrin and Serbian Cyrillic: Растока) is a village in the municipality of Bijelo Polje, Montenegro.

== Demographics ==
According to the 2003 census, the village had a population of 169 people.

According to the 2011 census, its population was 152.

Ethnicity in 2011
Ethnicity	Number	Percentage
Serbs	103	67.8%
Montenegrins	22	14.5%
Bosniaks	18	11.8%
other/undeclared	9	5.9%
Total	152	100%
