= Kukulje =

Kukulje may refer to:

- Kukulje (Srbac), a village in Srbac, Bosnia and Herzegovina
- Kukulje, Montenegro
