= Kostići =

- Village
- Location within Montenegro
- Country: Montenegro
- Municipality: Bijelo Polje

Population (2011)
  - Total: 166
- Time zone: UTC+1 (CET)
  - Summer (DST): UTC+2 (CEST)

Kostići (Montenegrin and Serbian Cyrillic: Костићи) is a village in the municipality of Bijelo Polje, Montenegro.

== Demographics ==
According to the 2003 census, the village had a population of 321 people.

According to the 2011 census, its population was 166.

Ethnicity in 2011
Ethnicity	Number	Percentage
Bosniaks	131	78.9%
other/undeclared	35	21.1%
Total	166	100%
