= Nedakusi =

Nedakusi Недакуси
- Village
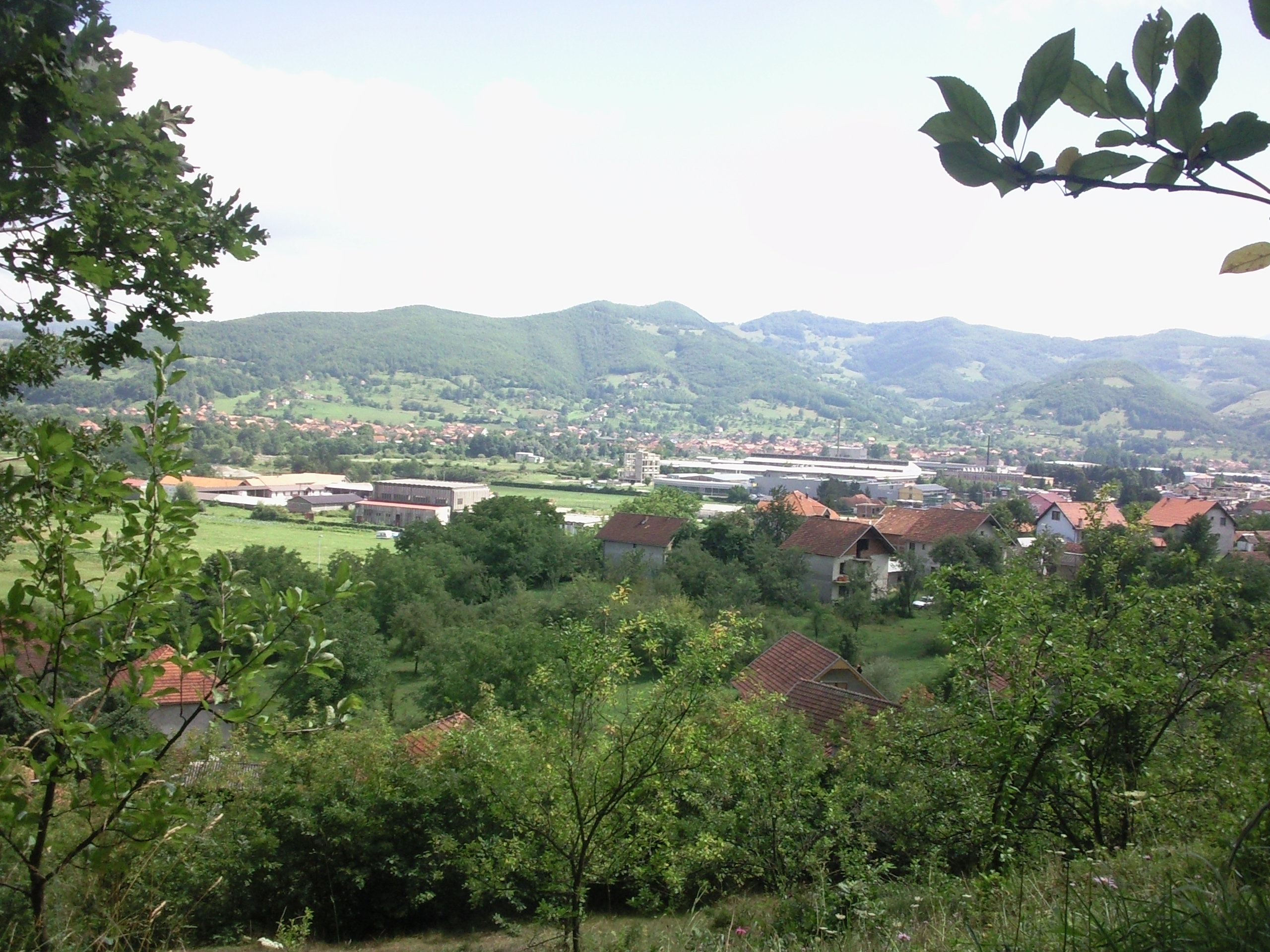

- Location within Montenegro
- Coordinates: 43°3′14″N 19°46′3″E
- Country: Montenegro
- Municipality: Bijelo Polje

Population (2011)
  - Total: 2,158
- Time zone: UTC+1 (CET)
  - Summer (DST): UTC+2 (CEST)

Nedakusi (Montenegrin Cyrillic:Недакуси) is a village in the municipality of Bijelo Polje, Montenegro. It is located just north of the town of Bijelo Polje.

== Demographics ==
According to the 2003 census, the village had a population of 2,308 people.

According to the 2011 census, its population was 2,158.

Ethnicity in 2011
Ethnicity	Number	Percentage
Serbs	764	35.4%
Bosniaks	649	30.1%
Montenegrins	378	17.5%
Roma	86	4.0%
Croats	6	0.3%
other/undeclared	275	12.7%
Total	2,158	100%
