= Goduša, Montenegro =

Goduša Годуша
- Village
- Location within Montenegro
- Country: Montenegro
- Municipality: Bijelo Polje

Population (2011)
  - Total: 355
- Time zone: UTC+1 (CET)
  - Summer (DST): UTC+2 (CEST)

Goduša (Montenegrin Cyrillic: Годуша) is a village in the municipality of Bijelo Polje, Montenegro.

== Demographics ==
According to the 2003 census, the village had a population of 481 people.

According to the 2011 census, its population was 355.

Ethnicity in 2011
Ethnicity	Number	Percentage
Bosniaks	196	55.2%
Montenegrins	17	4.8%
other/undeclared	142	40.0%
Total	355	100%
