= Gruban =

Gruban may refer to:

- Gruban Malić, fictional character and anti-hero in Miodrag Bulatović's novel Heroj na magarcu ili Vreme srama (Hero on a Donkey)
- Gruban v Booth, 1917 fraud case in England

== See also ==
- Groban (disambiguation)
