= Zaton, Montenegro =

Zaton Затон
- Village
- Location within Montenegro
- Country: Montenegro
- Municipality: Bijelo Polje

Population (2011)
  - Total: 983
- Time zone: UTC+1 (CET)
  - Summer (DST): UTC+2 (CEST)

Zaton (Montenegrin and Serbian Cyrillic: Затон) is a village in the municipality of Bijelo Polje, Montenegro.

== Demographics ==
According to the 2003 census, the village had a population of 930 people.

According to the 2011 census, its population was 983.

Ethnicity in 2011
Ethnicity	Number	Percentage
Serbs	494	50.3%
Montenegrins	363	36.9%
Bosniaks	54	5.5%
other/undeclared	72	7.3%
Total	983	100%
