= Džafića Brdo =

- Village
- Location within Montenegro
- Country: Montenegro
- Municipality: Bijelo Polje

Population (2011)
  - Total: 156
- Time zone: UTC+1 (CET)
  - Summer (DST): UTC+2 (CEST)

Džafića Brdo (Montenegrin Cyrillic: Џафића Брдо) is a village in the municipality of Bijelo Polje, Montenegro.

== Demographics ==
According to the 2003 census, the village had a population of 945 people.

According to the 2011 census, its population was 156.

Ethnicity in 2011
Ethnicity	Number	Percentage
Bosniaks	46	29.5%
Serbs	36	23.1%
Montenegrins	23	14.7%
other/undeclared	51	32.7%
Total	156	100%
