= Rokicki =

Rokicki (feminine: Rokicka; plural: Rokiccy) is a Polish surname. Notable people include:

- Janusz Rokicki (born 1974), Polish Paralympic athlete
- Konstanty Rokicki (1899–1958), Polish diplomat
- Michał Rokicki (1984–2021), Polish swimmer

== See also ==
- Rokita
- AmigaTeX, by Tomas Rokicki
