= Žiljak =

- Village
- Location within Montenegro
- Country: Montenegro
- Municipality: Bijelo Polje

Population (2011)
  - Total: 222
- Time zone: UTC+1 (CET)
  - Summer (DST): UTC+2 (CEST)

Žiljak (Montenegrin and Bosnian: Жиљак) is a village in the municipality of Bijelo Polje, Montenegro.

== Demographics ==
According to the 2003 census, the village had a population of 178 people.

According to the 2011 census, its population was 222.

Ethnicity in 2011
Ethnicity	Number	Percentage
Bosniaks	118	53.2%
Serbs	31	14.0%
Montenegrins	25	11.3%
other/undeclared	48	21.6%
Total	222	100%
