= Pobretići =

Pobretići Побретићи
- Village
- Location within Montenegro
- Country: Montenegro
- Municipality: Bijelo Polje

Population (2011)
  - Total: 175
- Time zone: UTC+1 (CET)
  - Summer (DST): UTC+2 (CEST)

Pobretići (Montenegrin Cyrillic: Побретићи) is a village in the municipality of Bijelo Polje, Montenegro.

== Demographics ==
According to the 2003 census, the village had a population of 182 people.

According to the 2011 census, its population was 175.

Ethnicity in 2011
Ethnicity	Number	Percentage
Bosniaks	99	56.6%
Serbs	53	30.3%
other/undeclared	23	13.1%
Total	175	100%
