= Šipovice =

- Village
- Location within Montenegro
- Country: Montenegro
- Municipality: Bijelo Polje

Population (2011)
  - Total: 44
- Time zone: UTC+1 (CET)
  - Summer (DST): UTC+2 (CEST)

Šipovice (Montenegrin and Bosnian: Шиповице) is a small village in the municipality of Bijelo Polje, Montenegro.

== Demographics ==
According to the 2003 census, the village had a population of 35 people.

According to the 2011 census, its population was 44.

Ethnicity in 2011
Ethnicity	Number	Percentage
Bosniaks	35	79.5%
other/undeclared	9	20.5%
Total	44	100%

== Notable people ==
- Ćamil Sijarić, Yugoslavian writer.
