= Osmanbegovo Selo =

- Village
- Location within Montenegro
- Country: Montenegro
- Municipality: Bijelo Polje

Population (2011)
  - Total: 79
- Time zone: UTC+1 (CET)
  - Summer (DST): UTC+2 (CEST)

Osmanbegovo Selo (Montenegrin Cyrillic: Османбегово Село) is a village in the municipality of Bijelo Polje, Montenegro.

== Demographics ==
According to the 2003 census, the village had a population of 69 people.

According to the 2011 census, its population was 79.

Ethnicity in 2011
Ethnicity	Number	Percentage
Bosniaks	55	69.6%
other/undeclared	24	30.4%
Total	79	100%
