= Dubov =

Dubov (Russian: Дубов) is a Russian masculine surname originating from the noun dub (oak), which characterized stubborn and strong men; its feminine counterpart is Dubova. Notable people with the surname include:

- Alexander Dubov (1877–1964), Russian builder and architect
- Daniil Dubov (born 1996), Russian chess grandmaster
- Daria Dubova (born 1999), Russian Group rhythmic gymnast
- Igor Dubov (1947–2002), Russian archaeologist
- Natalia Dubova (born 1948), Russian ice dancing coach and former competitor
- Nikolai Dubov (1910–1983), Russian children's writer
- Paul Dubov (1918–1979), American actor and screenwriter
- Sergei Dubov (1943–1994), Russian journalist, publisher and entrepreneur
- Vladimir Dubov (born 1988), Bulgarian freestyle wrestler
