= Boljanina =

Boljanina Бољанина
- Village
- Location within Montenegro
- Country: Montenegro
- Municipality: Bijelo Polje

Population (2011)
  - Total: 379
- Time zone: UTC+1 (CET)
  - Summer (DST): UTC+2 (CEST)

Boljanina (Montenegrin and Serbian Cyrillic: Бољанина) is a village in the municipality of Bijelo Polje, Montenegro.

== Demographics ==
According to the 2003 census, the village had a population of 398.

According to the 2011 census, its population was 379.

Ethnicity in 2011
Ethnicity	Number	Percentage
Bosniaks	164	43.3%
Serbs	104	27.4%
Montenegrins	12	3.2%
other/undeclared	99	26.1%
Total	379	100%
