= Lozna, Bijelo Polje =

Lozna Лозна
- Village
- Location within Montenegro
- Country: Montenegro
- Municipality: Bijelo Polje

Population (2011)
  - Total: 523
- Time zone: UTC+1 (CET)
  - Summer (DST): UTC+2 (CEST)

Lozna (Montenegrin Cyrillic: Лозна) is a village in the municipality of Bijelo Polje, Montenegro.

== Demographics ==
According to the 2003 census, the village had a population of 476. According to the 2011 census, its population was 523.

Ethnicity in 2011
Ethnicity	Number	Percentage
Bosniaks	264	50.5%
Serbs	113	21.6%
Montenegrins	51	9.8%
other/undeclared	95	18.2%
Total	523	100%
