= Radojeva Glava =

- Village
- Location within Montenegro
- Country: Montenegro
- Municipality: Bijelo Polje

Population (2011)
  - Total: 16
- Time zone: UTC+1 (CET)
  - Summer (DST): UTC+2 (CEST)

Radojeva Glava (Montenegrin Cyrillic: Радојева Глава) is a small village in the municipality of Bijelo Polje, Montenegro.

== Demographics ==
According to the 2003 census, the village had a population of 170 people.

According to the 2011 census, its population was 16.

Ethnicity in 2011
Ethnicity	Number	Percentage
Bosniaks	11	68.8%
other/undeclared	5	31.3%
Total	16	100%
