= Mojstir =

Mojstir Мојстир
- Village
- Location within Montenegro
- Country: Montenegro
- Municipality: Bijelo Polje

Population (2011)
  - Total: 100
- Time zone: UTC+1 (CET)
  - Summer (DST): UTC+2 (CEST)

Mojstir (Montenegrin Cyrillic: Мојстир) is a village in the municipality of Bijelo Polje, Montenegro.

== Demographics ==
According to the 2003 census, the village had a population of 134 people.

According to the 2011 census, its population was 100.

Ethnicity in 2011
Ethnicity	Number	Percentage
Bosniaks	47	47.0%
Serbs	29	29.0%
Montenegrins	8	8.0%
other/undeclared	16	16.0%
Total	100	100%
