= Rodijelja =

- Village
- Location within Montenegro
- Country: Montenegro
- Municipality: Bijelo Polje

Population (2011)
  - Total: 67
- Time zone: UTC+1 (CET)
  - Summer (DST): UTC+2 (CEST)

Rodijelja (Montenegrin and Serbian Cyrillic: Родијеља) is a small village in the municipality of Bijelo Polje, Montenegro.

== Demographics ==
According to the 2003 census, the village had a population of 155 people.

According to the 2011 census, its population was 67.

Ethnicity in 2011
Ethnicity	Number	Percentage
Serbs	35	52.2%
Montenegrins	17	25.4%
Bosniaks	14	20.9%
other/undeclared	1	1.5%
Total	67	100%
