= Žurena =

Žurena Журена
- Village
- Location within Montenegro
- Country: Montenegro
- Municipality: Bijelo Polje

Population (2011)
  - Total: 166
- Time zone: UTC+1 (CET)
  - Summer (DST): UTC+2 (CEST)

Žurena (Montenegrin and Serbian: Журена) is a village in the municipality of Bijelo Polje, Montenegro.

== Demographics ==
Ethnicity in 2011
Ethnicity	Number	Percentage
Serbs	74	44.6%
Bosniaks	21	12.7%
Montenegrins	13	7.8%
other/undeclared	58	34.9%
Total	166	100%

Historical population
Year	Pop.	±%
1948	185	—
1953	219	+18.4%
1961	223	+1.8%
1971	269	+20.6%
1981	255	−5.2%
1991	217	−14.9%
2003	254	+17.1%
2011	166	−34.6%
