= Kanje =

Kanje Кање
- Village
- Location within Montenegro
- Country: Montenegro
- Municipality: Bijelo Polje

Population (2011)
  - Total: 293
- Time zone: UTC+1 (CET)
  - Summer (DST): UTC+2 (CEST)

Kanje (Cyrillic: Кање) is a village in the municipality of Bijelo Polje, Montenegro.

== Demographics ==
According to the 2003 census, the village had a population of 389 people.

According to the 2011 census, its population was 293.

Ethnicity in 2011
Ethnicity	Number	Percentage
Bosniaks	165	56.3%
Serbs	7	2.4%
other/undeclared	121	41.3%
Total	293	100%
