= Orahovica, Montenegro =

Orahovica
- Village
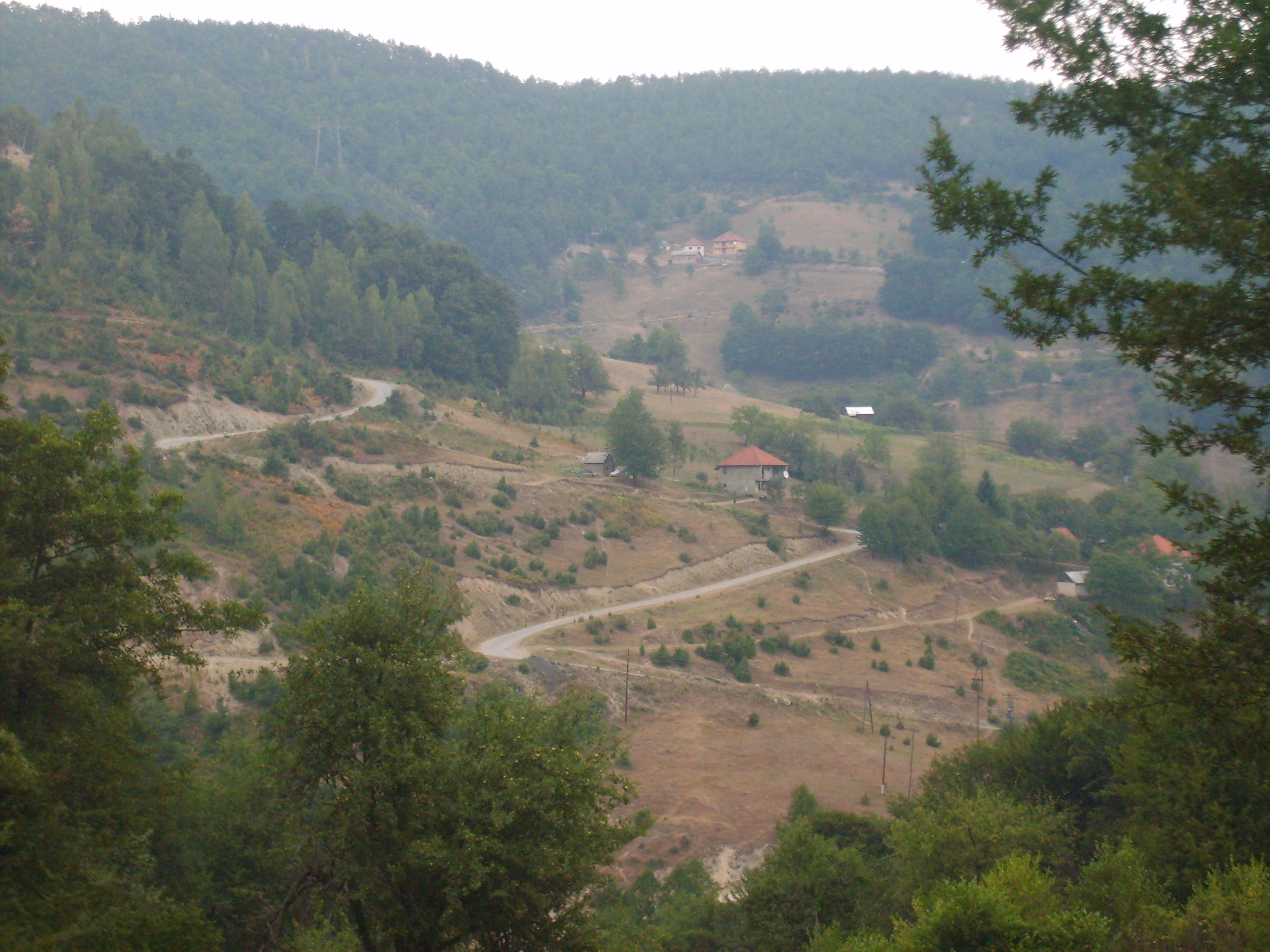
- View of Orahovica

- Location within Montenegro
- Country: Montenegro
- Municipality: Bijelo Polje

Population (2011)
  - Total: 282
- Time zone: UTC+1 (CET)
  - Summer (DST): UTC+2 (CEST)

Orahovica (Montenegrin Cyrillic: Ораховица) is a village in the municipality of Bijelo Polje, Montenegro.

== Demographics ==
According to the 2003 census, the village had a population of 479 people.

According to the 2011 census, its population was 282.

Ethnicity in 2011
Ethnicity	Number	Percentage
Montenegrins	87	30.9%
Serbs	76	27.0%
Bosniaks	21	7.4%
other/undeclared	98	34.8%
Total	282	100%
