= Crhalj =

Crhalj Црхаљ
- Village
- Location within Montenegro
- Country: Montenegro
- Municipality: Bijelo Polje

Population (2011)
  - Total: 145
- Time zone: UTC+1 (CET)
  - Summer (DST): UTC+2 (CEST)

Crhalj (Montenegrin and Serbian Cyrillic: Црхаљ) is a village in the municipality of Bijelo Polje, Montenegro.

== Demographics ==
According to the 2003 census, the village had a population of 476.

According to the 2011 census, its population was 145.

Ethnicity in 2011
Ethnicity	Number	Percentage
Bosniaks	78	53.8%
other/undeclared	67	46.2%
Total	145	100%
