= Pećarska =

Pećarska Пецарска
- Village
- Location within Montenegro
- Country: Montenegro
- Municipality: Bijelo Polje

Population (2011)
  - Total: 133
- Time zone: UTC+1 (CET)
  - Summer (DST): UTC+2 (CEST)

Pećarska (Montenegrin and Serbian Cyrillic: Пецарска) is a village in the municipality of Bijelo Polje, Montenegro.

== Demographics ==
According to the 2003 census, the village had a population of 229 people.

According to the 2011 census, its population was 133.

Ethnicity in 2011
Ethnicity	Number	Percentage
Serbs	84	63.2%
Bosniaks	24	18.0%
Montenegrins	19	14.3%
other/undeclared	6	4.5%
Total	133	100%
