= Loznica, Montenegro =

Loznica Лозница
- Village
- Location within Montenegro
- Coordinates: 43°02′10″N 19°45′25″E
- Country: Montenegro
- Municipality: Bijelo Polje

Population (2011)
  - Total: 1,296
- Time zone: UTC+1 (CET)
  - Summer (DST): UTC+2 (CEST)

Loznica (Montenegrin Cyrillic: Лозница) is a village in the municipality of Bijelo Polje, Montenegro.

== Demographics ==
According to the 2003 census, the village had a population of 279 people.

According to the 2011 census, its population was 1,296.

Ethnicity in 2011
Ethnicity	Number	Percentage
Bosniaks	641	49.5%
Serbs	192	14.8%
Montenegrins	115	8.9%
Roma	17	1.3%
other/undeclared	331	25.5%
Total	1,296	100%
