= Voljavac =

Voljavac Вољавац
- Village
- Location within Montenegro
- Country: Montenegro
- Municipality: Bijelo Polje

Population (2011)
  - Total: 202
- Time zone: UTC+1 (CET)
  - Summer (DST): UTC+2 (CEST)

Voljavac (Montenegrin and Serbian Cyrillic: Вољавац) is a village in the municipality of Bijelo Polje, Montenegro.

== Demographics ==
According to the 2003 census, the village had a population of 194 people.

According to the 2011 census, its population was 202.

Ethnicity in 2011
Ethnicity	Number	Percentage
Bosniaks	83	41.1%
Serbs	68	33.7%
Montenegrins	6	3.0%
other/undeclared	33	11.3%
Total	202	100%
