= Zminac =

Zminac Зминац
- Village
- Location within Montenegro
- Country: Montenegro
- Municipality: Bijelo Polje

Population (2011)
  - Total: 190
- Time zone: UTC+1 (CET)
  - Summer (DST): UTC+2 (CEST)

Zminac (Montenegrin Cyrillic: Зминац) is a village in the municipality of Bijelo Polje, Montenegro.

== Demographics ==
According to the 2003 census, the village had a population of 214 people.

According to the 2011 census, its population was 190.

Ethnicity in 2011
Ethnicity	Number	Percentage
Bosniaks	80	42.1%
Montenegrins	43	22.6%
other/undeclared	67	35.3%
Total	190	100%
