= Poda, Bijelo Polje =

Poda Пода
- Village
- Location within Montenegro
- Country: Montenegro
- Municipality: Bijelo Polje

Population (2011)
  - Total: 289
- Time zone: UTC+1 (CET)
  - Summer (DST): UTC+2 (CEST)

Poda (Montenegrin Cyrillic: Пода) is a village in the municipality of Bijelo Polje, Montenegro.

== Demographics ==
According to the 2003 census, the village had a population of 499 people.

According to the 2011 census, its population was 289.

Ethnicity in 2011
Ethnicity	Number	Percentage
Bosniaks	249	86.2%
Montenegrins	18	6.2%
other/undeclared	22	7.6%
Total	289	100%
