= Bojišta =

Bojišta may refer to:

- Bojišta, Bosnia and Herzegovina
- Bojišta, Montenegro
