= Godijevo =

Godijevo Годијево
- Village
- Location within Montenegro
- Country: Montenegro
- Municipality: Bijelo Polje

Population (2011)
  - Total: 478
- Time zone: UTC+1 (CET)
  - Summer (DST): UTC+2 (CEST)

Godijevo (Montenegrin Cyrillic: Годијево) is a village in the municipality of Bijelo Polje, Montenegro.

== Demographics ==
According to the 2003 census, the village had a population of 636 people.

According to the 2011 census, its population was 478.

Ethnicity in 2011
Ethnicity	Number	Percentage
Bosniaks	405	84.7%
Montenegrins	9	1.9%
other/undeclared	64	13.4%
Total	478	100%
