= Metanjac =

Metanjac Метањац
- Village
- Location within Montenegro
- Country: Montenegro
- Municipality: Bijelo Polje

Population (2011)
  - Total: 205
- Time zone: UTC+1 (CET)
  - Summer (DST): UTC+2 (CEST)

Metanjac (Montenegrin Cyrillic: Метањац) is a village in the municipality of Bijelo Polje, Montenegro. It is located close to the Serbian border.

== Demographics ==
According to the 2003 census, the village had a population of 219 people.

According to the 2011 census, its population was 205.

Ethnicity in 2011
Ethnicity	Number	Percentage
Bosniaks	76	37.1%
Serbs	32	15.6%
Montenegrins	10	4.9%
other/undeclared	87	42.4%
Total	205	100%
