= Pape, Montenegro =

Pape
- Village
- Location within Montenegro
- Coordinates: 43.042167°N 19.676745°E
- Country: Montenegro
- Municipality: Bijelo Polje

Population (2011)
  - Total: 229
- Time zone: UTC+1 (CET)
  - Summer (DST): UTC+2 (CEST)

Pape (Montenegrin and Serbian Cyrillic: Папе) is a village in the municipality of Bijelo Polje, Montenegro.

== Demographics ==
According to the 2003 census, the village had a population of 295 people.

According to the 2011 census, its population was 229.

Ethnicity in 2011
Ethnicity	Number	Percentage
Serbs	124	54.1%
Montenegrins	105	45.9%
Total	229	100%

== Notable people ==
- Marko Vešović, writer
