= Bijedići =

Bijedići Биједићи
- Village
- Location within Montenegro
- Country: Montenegro
- Municipality: Bijelo Polje

Population (2011)
  - Total: 70
- Time zone: UTC+1 (CET)
  - Summer (DST): UTC+2 (CEST)

Bijedići (Montenegrin and Serbian Cyrillic: Биједићи) is a village in the municipality of Bijelo Polje, Montenegro.

== Demographics ==
According to the 2003 census, the village had a population of 100.

According to the 2011 census, its population was 70.

Ethnicity in 2011
Ethnicity	Number	Percentage
Serbs	45	64.3%
Montenegrins	14	20.0%
other/undeclared	11	15.7%
Total	70	100%
