= Grab, Bijelo Polje =

Grab Граб
- Village
- Location within Montenegro
- Country: Montenegro
- Municipality: Bijelo Polje

Population (2011)
  - Total: 305
- Time zone: UTC+1 (CET)
  - Summer (DST): UTC+2 (CEST)

Grab (Montenegrin and Serbian Cyrillic: Граб) is a village in the municipality of Bijelo Polje, Montenegro. It is located at the Serbian border.

== Demographics ==
According to the 2003 census, the village had a population of 501 people.

According to the 2011 census, its population was 305.

Ethnicity in 2011
Ethnicity	Number	Percentage
Serbs	228	74.8%
Montenegrins	68	22.3%
other/undeclared	9	3.0%
Total	305	100%
