= Stožer, Montenegro =

Stožer Стожер
- Village
- Location within Montenegro
- Country: Montenegro
- Municipality: Bijelo Polje

Population (2011)
  - Total: 151
- Time zone: UTC+1 (CET)
  - Summer (DST): UTC+2 (CEST)

Stožer (Montenegrin and Serbian Cyrillic: Стожер) is a village in the municipality of Bijelo Polje, Montenegro.

== Demographics ==
By the 2003 census, the village had a population of 257 people.

According to the 2011 census, its population was 151.

Ethnicity in 2011
Ethnicity	Number	Percentage
Serbs	111	73.5%
Montenegrins	28	18.5%
other/undeclared	12	7.9%
Total	151	100%
