= Rasovo, Montenegro =

Rasovo Расово
- Village
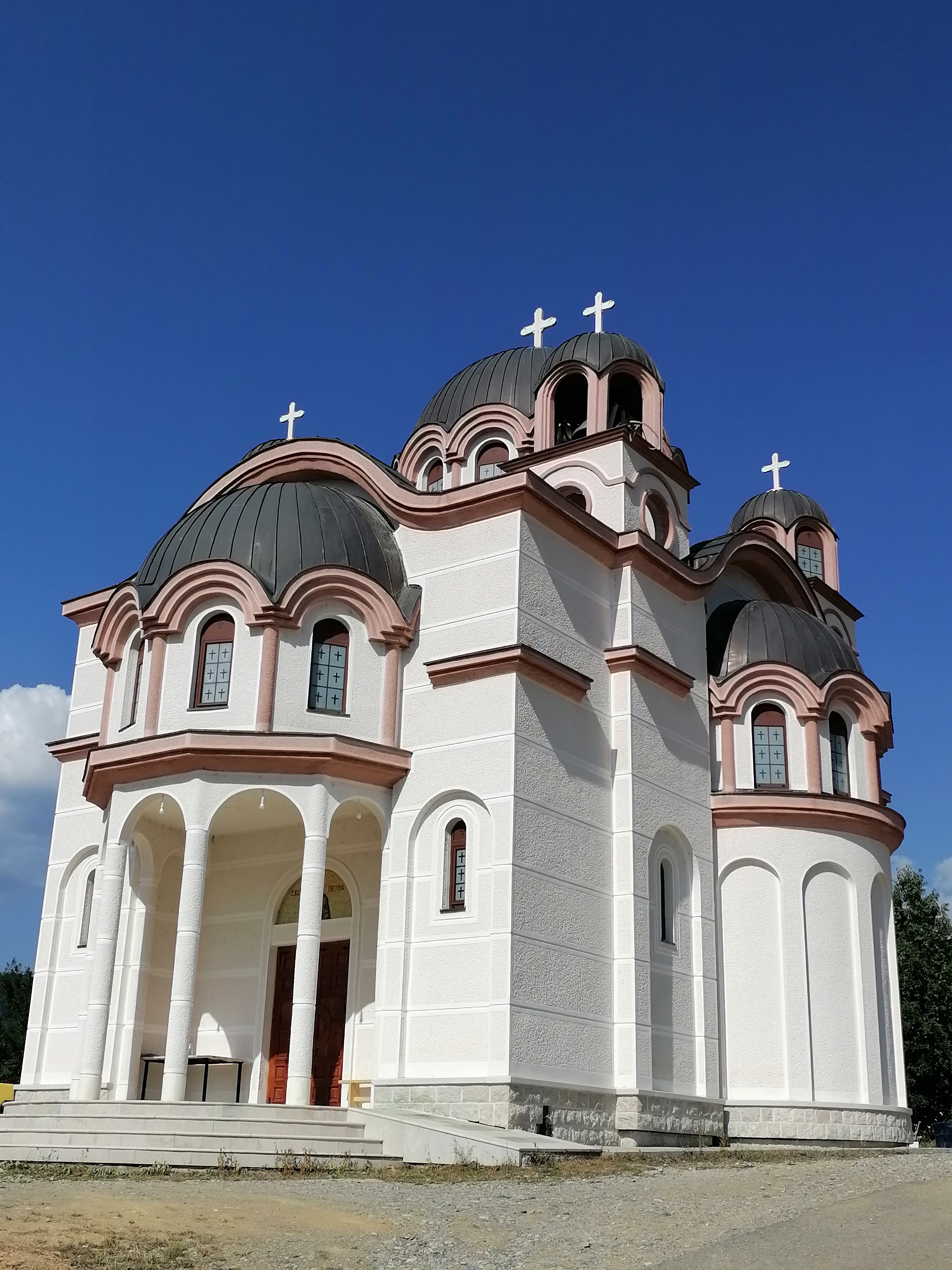

- Location within Montenegro
- Coordinates: 43.045315°N 19.777264°E
- Country: Montenegro
- Municipality: Bijelo Polje

Population (2011)
  - Total: 578
- Time zone: UTC+1 (CET)
  - Summer (DST): UTC+2 (CEST)

Rasovo (Montenegrin Cyrillic: Расово) is a village in the municipality of Bijelo Polje, Montenegro.

== Demographics ==
According to the 2003 census, the village had a population of 609 people.

According to the 2011 census, its population was 578.

Ethnicity in 2011
Ethnicity	Number	Percentage
Bosniaks	286	49.5%
Serbs	132	22.8%
Montenegrins	39	6.7%
other/undeclared	121	20.9%
Total	578	100%
