= Grančarevo =

- Village
- Location within Montenegro
- Country: Montenegro
- Municipality: Bijelo Polje

Population (2011)
  - Total: 198
- Time zone: UTC+1 (CET)
  - Summer (DST): UTC+2 (CEST)

Grančarevo (Montenegrin and Serbian Cyrillic: Гранчарево) is a village in the municipality of Bijelo Polje, Montenegro.

== Demographics ==
According to the 2003 census, the village had a population of 242 people.

According to the 2011 census, its population was 198.

Ethnicity in 2011
Ethnicity	Number	Percentage
Serbs	134	67.7%
Montenegrins	51	25.8%
other/undeclared	13	6.6%
Total	198	100%
