= Lekovina =

- Village
- Location within Montenegro
- Country: Montenegro
- Municipality: Bijelo Polje

Population (2011)
  - Total: 256
- Time zone: UTC+1 (CET)
  - Summer (DST): UTC+2 (CEST)

Lekovina (Montenegrin and Serbian Cyrillic: Лековина) is a village in the municipality of Bijelo Polje, Montenegro.

== Demographics ==
According to the 2003 census, the village had a population of 397 people.

According to the 2011 census, its population was 256.

Ethnicity in 2011
Ethnicity	Number	Percentage
Serbs	191	74.6%
Montenegrins	57	22.3%
other/undeclared	8	3.1%
Total	256	100%
