= Radulići =

- Village
- Location within Montenegro
- Country: Montenegro
- Municipality: Bijelo Polje

Population (2011)
  - Total: 81
- Time zone: UTC+1 (CET)
  - Summer (DST): UTC+2 (CEST)

Radulići (Montenegrin and Serbian Cyrillic: Радулићи) is a small village in the municipality of Bijelo Polje, Montenegro.

== Demographics ==
According to the 2003 census, the village had a population of 112 people.

According to the 2011 census, its population was 81.

Ethnicity in 2011
Ethnicity	Number	Percentage
Serbs	64	79.0%
Montenegrins	13	16.0%
other/undeclared	4	4.9%
Total	81	100%
