= Đalovići =

- Village
- Location within Montenegro
- Country: Montenegro
- Municipality: Bijelo Polje

Population (2011)
  - Total: 37
- Time zone: UTC+1 (CET)
  - Summer (DST): UTC+2 (CEST)

Đalovići (Montenegrin and Serbian Cyrillic: Ђаловићи) is a village in the municipality of Bijelo Polje, Montenegro.

== Demographics ==
According to the 2003 census, the village had a population of 115 people.

According to the 2011 census, its population was 37.

Ethnicity in 2011
Ethnicity	Number	Percentage
Serbs	35	94.6%
other/undeclared	2	5.4%
Total	37	100%
