= Cerovo, Bijelo Polje =

Cerovo Церово
- Village
- Location within Montenegro
- Country: Montenegro
- Municipality: Bijelo Polje

Population (2011)
  - Total: 175
- Time zone: UTC+1 (CET)
  - Summer (DST): UTC+2 (CEST)

Cerovo (Montenegrin and Serbian Cyrillic: Церово) is a village in the municipality of Bijelo Polje, Montenegro.

== Demographics ==
According to the 2003 census, the village had a population of 261.

According to the 2011 census, its population was 175.

Ethnicity in 2011
Ethnicity	Number	Percentage
Serbs	141	80.6%
Montenegrins	33	18.9%
other/undeclared	1	0.6%
Total	175	100%
