= Sadići =

- Village
- Location within Montenegro
- Country: Montenegro
- Municipality: Bijelo Polje

Population (2011)
  - Total: 89
- Time zone: UTC+1 (CET)
  - Summer (DST): UTC+2 (CEST)

Sadići (Montenegrin and Serbian Cyrillic: Садићи) is a small village in the municipality of Bijelo Polje, Montenegro.

== Demographics ==
According to the 2003 census, the village had a population of 113 people.

According to the 2011 census, its population was 89.

Ethnicity in 2011
Ethnicity	Number	Percentage
Serbs	60	67.4%
Montenegrins	27	30.3%
other/undeclared	2	2.2%
Total	89	100%
