= Korita, Montenegro =

Korita
- Village
- Location within Montenegro
- Country: Montenegro
- Municipality: Bijelo Polje

Population (2003)
  - Total: 346
- Time zone: UTC+1 (CET)
  - Summer (DST): UTC+2 (CEST)

Korita (Montenegrin Cyrillic: Корита) is a village in Bijelo Polje Municipality, in northern Montenegro. According to the 2003 census, the village had a population of 346 people.
