= Unevine =

Unevine Уневине
- Village
- Location within Montenegro
- Country: Montenegro
- Municipality: Bijelo Polje

Population (2011)
  - Total: 280
- Time zone: UTC+1 (CET)
  - Summer (DST): UTC+2 (CEST)

Unevine (Montenegrin and Serbian Cyrillic: Уневине) is a village in the municipality of Bijelo Polje, Montenegro.

== Demographics ==
According to the 2003 census, the village had a population of 282 people.

According to the 2011 census, its population was 280.

Ethnicity in 2011
Ethnicity	Number	Percentage
Serbs	168	60.0%
Montenegrins	88	31.4%
other/undeclared	24	8.6%
Total	280	100%
