= Čeoče =

Village in the municipality of Bijelo Polje

- Village
- Location within Montenegro
- Country: Montenegro
- Municipality: Bijelo Polje

Population (2011)
  - Total: 65
- Time zone: UTC+1 (CET)
  - Summer (DST): UTC+2 (CEST)

Čeoče (Montenegrin and Serbian Cyrillic: Чеоче) is a village in the municipality of Bijelo Polje, Montenegro.

== Demographics ==
According to the 2003 census, the village had a population of 78 people.

According to the 2011 census, its population was 65.

Ethnicity in 2011
Ethnicity	Number	Percentage
Serbs	43	66.2%
Montenegrins	21	32.3%
other/undeclared	1	1.5%
Total	65	100%
