= Dobrinje, Montenegro =

Dobrinje Добриње
- Village
- Location within Montenegro
- Country: Montenegro
- Municipality: Bijelo Polje

Population (2011)
  - Total: 293
- Time zone: UTC+1 (CET)
  - Summer (DST): UTC+2 (CEST)

Dobrinje (Montenegrin and Serbian Cyrillic: Добриње) is a village in the municipality of Bijelo Polje, Montenegro.

== Demographics ==
According to the 2003 census, the village had a population of 248 people.

According to the 2011 census, its population was 293.

Ethnicity in 2011
| Ethnicity | Number | Percentage |
|---|---|---|
| Serbs | 13 | 4.4% |
| Montenegrins | 83 | 28.3% |
| Bosniaks | 164 | 56.0% |
| other/undeclared | 33 | 11.3% |
| Total | 293 | 100% |
