= Obrov, Montenegro =

Obrov Обров
- Village
- Location within Montenegro
- Country: Montenegro
- Municipality: Bijelo Polje

Population (2011)
  - Total: 330
- Time zone: UTC+1 (CET)
  - Summer (DST): UTC+2 (CEST)

Obrov (Montenegrin Cyrillic: Обров) is a village in the municipality of Bijelo Polje, Montenegro.

== Demographics ==
According to the 2003 census, the village had a population of 316 people.

According to the 2011 census, its population was 330.

Ethnicity in 2011
Ethnicity	Number	Percentage
Bosniaks	102	30.9%
Serbs	95	28.8%
Montenegrins	53	16.1%
other/undeclared	80	24.2%
Total	330	100%
