= Dobrinja (disambiguation) =

Dobrinja may refer to the following places:

- Dobrinja, neighborhood of Sarajevo
- Dobrinja, Jablanica, village in Jablanica municipality, Bosnia and Herzegovina
- Dobrinja (Modriča), village in Modriča municipality, Bosnia and Herzegovina
- Dobrinja (Požega), village in Požega municipality, Serbia, whence Prince Miloš Obrenović came from
