= Sela, Bijelo Polje =

Sela Села
- Village
- Location within Montenegro
- Country: Montenegro
- Municipality: Bijelo Polje

Population (2011)
  - Total: 40
- Time zone: UTC+1 (CET)
  - Summer (DST): UTC+2 (CEST)

Sela (Montenegrin and Serbian Cyrillic: Села) is a small village in the municipality of Bijelo Polje, Montenegro.

== Demographics ==
According to the 2003 census, the village had a population of 61 people.

According to the 2011 census, its population was 40.

Ethnicity in 2011
Ethnicity	Number	Percentage
Serbs	20	50.0%
Montenegrins	16	40.0%
other/undeclared	4	10.0%
Total	40	100%
