= Pripčići =

Pripčići Припчићи
- Village
- Location within Montenegro
- Country: Montenegro
- Municipality: Bijelo Polje

Population (2011)
  - Total: 282
- Time zone: UTC+1 (CET)
  - Summer (DST): UTC+2 (CEST)

Pripčići (Montenegrin and Serbian Cyrillic: Припчићи) is a village in the municipality of Bijelo Polje, Montenegro.

== Demographics ==
According to the 2003 census, the village had a population of 190 people.

According to the 2011 census, its population was 282.

Ethnicity in 2011
Ethnicity	Number	Percentage
Serbs	151	53.5%
Montenegrins	65	23.0%
other/undeclared	66	23.4%
Total	282	100%
