= Čokrlije =

- Village
- Location within Montenegro
- Country: Montenegro
- Municipality: Bijelo Polje

Population (2011)
  - Total: 153
- Time zone: UTC+1 (CET)
  - Summer (DST): UTC+2 (CEST)

Čokrlije (Montenegrin and Serbian Cyrillic: Чокрлије) is a village in the municipality of Bijelo Polje, Montenegro.

== Demographics ==
According to the 2003 census, the village had a population of 144 people.

According to the 2011 census, its population was 153.

Ethnicity in 2011
| Ethnicity | Number | Percentage |
|---|---|---|
| Serbs | 117 | 76.5% |
| Montenegrins | 35 | 22.9% |
| other/undeclared | 1 | 0.7% |
| Total | 153 | 100% |
