= Dobrakovo =

Dobrakovo Добраково
- Village
- Location within Montenegro
- Coordinates: 43.1394°N 19.7744°E
- Country: Montenegro
- Municipality: Bijelo Polje
- Elevation: 861 m (2,825 ft)

Population (2011)
  - Total: 334
- Time zone: UTC+1 (CET)
  - Summer (DST): UTC+2 (CEST)

Dobrakovo (Montenegrin Cyrillic: Добраково) is a village in the municipality of Bijelo Polje, Montenegro. It is located at the Serbian border.

== Demographics ==
According to the 2003 census, the village had a population of 350 people. Near the village, there is border crossing between Montenegro and Serbia.

According to the 2011 census, its population was 334.

Ethnicity in 2011
Ethnicity	Number	Percentage
Bosniaks	265	79.3%
other/undeclared	69	20.7%
Total	334	100%
