= Kukulje, Montenegro =

Kukulje
- Village
- Location within Montenegro
- Country: Montenegro
- Municipality: Bijelo Polje

Population (2011)
  - Total: 464
- Time zone: UTC+1 (CET)
  - Summer (DST): UTC+2 (CEST)

Kukulje (Montenegrin and Serbian Cyrillic: Кукуље) is a village in the municipality of Bijelo Polje, Montenegro.

== Demographics ==
According to the 2003 census, the village had a population of 569 people.

According to the 2011 census, its population was 464.

Ethnicity in 2011
Ethnicity	Number	Percentage
Bosniaks	271	58.4%
Serbs	41	8.8%
other/undeclared	152	32.8%
Total	464	100%
