= Potrk =

Potrk Потрк
- Village
- Location within Montenegro
- Country: Montenegro
- Municipality: Bijelo Polje

Population (2011)
  - Total: 259
- Time zone: UTC+1 (CET)
  - Summer (DST): UTC+2 (CEST)

Potrk (Montenegrin and Serbian Cyrillic: Потрк) is a village in the municipality of Bijelo Polje, Montenegro.

== Demographics ==
According to the 2003 census, the village had a population of 418 people.

According to the 2011 census, its population was 259.

Ethnicity in 2011
Ethnicity	Number	Percentage
Serbs	150	57.9%
Montenegrins	97	37.5%
other/undeclared	12	4.6%
Total	259	100%
