= Dubovo, Bijelo Polje =

Dubovo Дубовa
- Village
- Location within Montenegro
- Country: Montenegro
- Municipality: Bijelo Polje

Population (2011)
  - Total: 126
- Time zone: UTC+1 (CET)
  - Summer (DST): UTC+2 (CEST)

Dubovo (Montenegrin and Serbian Cyrillic: Дубовa) is a village in the municipality of Bijelo Polje, Montenegro.

== Demographics ==
According to the 2003 census, the village had a population of 204 people.

According to the 2011 census, its population was 126.

Ethnicity in 2011
Ethnicity	Number	Percentage
Serbs	45	35.7%
Montenegrins	24	19.0%
Bosniaks	19	15.1%
other/undeclared	38	30.2%
Total	126	100%
