= Rakita =

Rakita (South and East Slavic for basket willow) may refer to:

== Places ==
- Rakita, Greece, a location in the municipal unit Leontio, Achaea, Greece. It is part of the community of Ano Mazaraki
- Olympiada, Greece, a village in northern Greece that was known as Rakita before 1927
- Rakita, Serbia, a village in the municipality of Babušnica, Serbia
- Rakita, Montenegro, a village in Bijelo Polje Municipality, in northern Montenegro
- Rakita, Sofia Province, a village in Slivnitsa Municipality, Sofia Province, western Bulgaria

== People ==
- Mark Rakita (born 1938), Russian two-time Olympic champion sabreur

== Media ==
- Rakita, Malaysian radio station

== See also ==
- Rokita (disambiguation)
