= Bliškovo =

Bliškovo Блишково
- Village
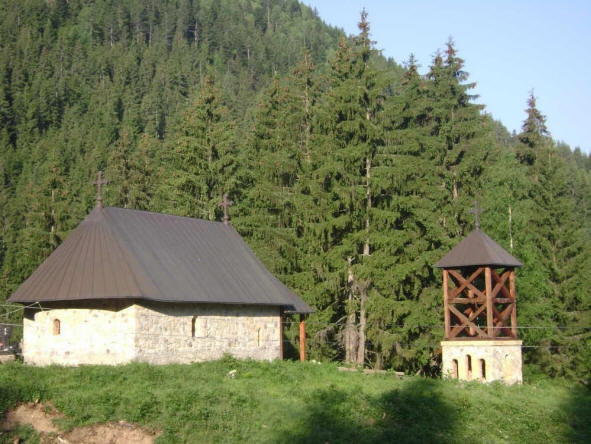

- Location within Montenegro
- Country: Montenegro
- Municipality: Bijelo Polje

Population (2011)
  - Total: 165
- Time zone: UTC+1 (CET)
  - Summer (DST): UTC+2 (CEST)

Bliškovo (Montenegrin and Serbian Cyrillic: Блишково) is a village in the municipality of Bijelo Polje, Montenegro.

== Demographics ==
According to the 2003 census, the village had a population of 249.

According to the 2011 census, its population was 165.

Ethnicity in 2011
Ethnicity	Number	Percentage
Serbs	143	86.7%
Montenegrins	19	11.5%
other/undeclared	3	1.8%
Total	165	100%
