= Ujniče =

- Village
- Location within Montenegro
- Country: Montenegro
- Municipality: Bijelo Polje

Population (2011)
  - Total: 20
- Time zone: UTC+1 (CET)
  - Summer (DST): UTC+2 (CEST)

Ujniče (Montenegrin Cyrillic: Ујниче) is a small village in the municipality of Bijelo Polje, Montenegro.

== Demographics ==
According to the 2003 census, the village had a population of 29 people.

According to the 2011 census, its population was 20.

Ethnicity in 2011
Ethnicity	Number	Percentage
Montenegrins	16	80.0%
other/undeclared	4	20.0%
Total	20	100%
