= Dubova =

Dubova may refer to:

- Dubová (disambiguation), multiple places in western Slovakia
- Dubova, Ukraine, a village in Ukraine
- Dubova, the Romanian name for Dubove village, Mikhalcha Commune, Storozhynets Raion, Ukraine
- Dubova, Mehedinți, a commune in Romania
- Dubova Colonorum, a volunteer camp aiming to restore the ruins of a medieval church in Slovakia

== See also ==
- Dubovo (disambiguation)
