= Boturići, Montenegro =

Boturići Ботурићи
- Village
- Location within Montenegro
- Country: Montenegro
- Municipality: Bijelo Polje

Population (2011)
  - Total: 122
- Time zone: UTC+1 (CET)
  - Summer (DST): UTC+2 (CEST)

Boturići (Montenegrin and Serbian Cyrillic: Ботурићи) is a village in the municipality of Bijelo Polje, Montenegro.

== Demographics ==
According to the 2003 census, the village had a population of 131.

According to the 2011 census, its population was 122.

Ethnicity in 2011
Ethnicity	Number	Percentage
Bosniaks	61	50.0%
Serbs	46	37.7%
other/undeclared	15	12.3%
Total	122	100%
