= Pali, Montenegro =

Pali
- Village
- Location within Montenegro
- Country: Montenegro
- Municipality: Bijelo Polje

Population (2011)
  - Total: 78
- Time zone: UTC+1 (CET)
  - Summer (DST): UTC+2 (CEST)

Pali (Montenegrin and Serbian Cyrillic: Пали) is a village in the municipality of Bijelo Polje, Montenegro.

== Demographics ==
According to the 2003 census, the village had a population of 163 people.

According to the 2011 census, its population was 78.

Ethnicity in 2011
Ethnicity	Number	Percentage
Serbs	40	51.3%
Montenegrins	29	37.2%
other/undeclared	9	11.5%
Total	78	100%
