= Mokri Lug, Bijelo Polje =

Mokri Lug
- Village
- Location within Montenegro
- Country: Montenegro
- Municipality: Bijelo Polje

Population (2011)
  - Total: 35
- Time zone: UTC+1 (CET)
  - Summer (DST): UTC+2 (CEST)

Mokri Lug (Montenegrin and Serbian Cyrillic: Мокри Луг) is a village in the municipality of Bijelo Polje, Montenegro.

== Demographics ==
According to the 2003 census, the village had a population of 47 people.

According to the 2011 census, its population was 35.

Ethnicity in 2011
Ethnicity	Number	Percentage
Serbs	12	34.3%
Montenegrins	6	17.1%
other/undeclared	17	48.6%
Total	35	100%
