= Jabučno =

- Village
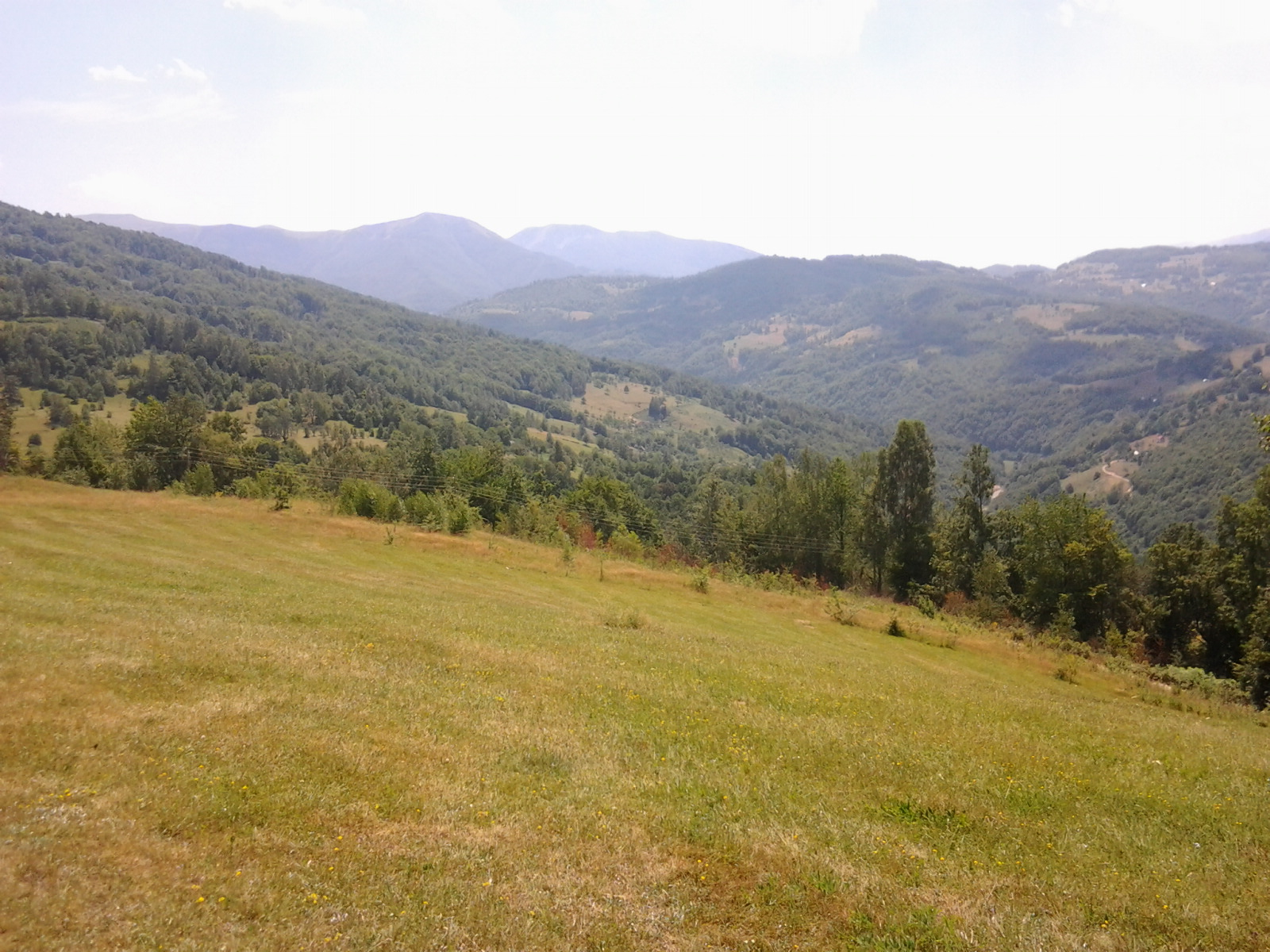
- View of Jabučno Landscape

- Location within Montenegro
- Country: Montenegro
- Municipality: Bijelo Polje

Population (2011)
  - Total: 95
- Time zone: UTC+1 (CET)
  - Summer (DST): UTC+2 (CEST)

Jabučno (Montenegrin and Serbian Cyrillic: Јабучно) is a village in the municipality of Bijelo Polje, Montenegro.

== Demographics ==
According to the 2003 census, the village had a population of 104 people.

According to the 2011 census, its population was 95.

Ethnicity in 2011
Ethnicity	Number	Percentage
Serbs	58	61.1%
Montenegrins	30	31.6%
other/undeclared	7	7.4%
Total	95	100%
