= Njegnjevo =

Njegnjevo Његњево
- Village
- Location within Montenegro
- Country: Montenegro
- Municipality: Bijelo Polje

Population (2011)
  - Total: 404
- Time zone: UTC+1 (CET)
  - Summer (DST): UTC+2 (CEST)

Njegnjevo (Montenegrin and Serbian Cyrillic: Његњево) is a village in the municipality of Bijelo Polje, Montenegro. It is located near the Serbian border.

== Demographics ==
According to the 2003 census, the village had a population of 699 people.

According to the 2011 census, its population was 404.

Ethnicity in 2011
Ethnicity	Number	Percentage
Serbs	266	65.8%
Montenegrins	118	29.2%
other/undeclared	20	5.0%
Total	404	100%
