= Groban =

Groban is a surname. Notable people bearing it include:

- Josh Groban (born 1981), American singer-songwriter
- Joshua Groban, associate justice of the California Supreme Court
- Lee (L.D.) Groban (fl. 1980s), American poet, artist, and reader of his own 87-hour poem in The Cure for Insomnia

== See also ==
- Gruban (disambiguation)
