= Babaići =

Babaići Бабаићи
- Village
- Location within Montenegro
- Country: Montenegro
- Municipality: Bijelo Polje

Population (2011)
  - Total: 53
- Time zone: UTC+1 (CET)
  - Summer (DST): UTC+2 (CEST)

Babaići (Montenegrin: Бабаићи) is a village in the municipality of Bijelo Polje, Montenegro.

== Demographics ==
According to the 2003 census, the village had a population of 105.

According to the 2011 census, its population was 53.

Ethnicity in 2011
| Ethnicity | Number | Percentage |
|---|---|---|
| Montenegrins | 29 | 54.7% |
| Serbs | 17 | 32.1% |
| other/undeclared | 7 | 13.2% |
| Total | 53 | 100% |
