= Prijelozi =

- Village
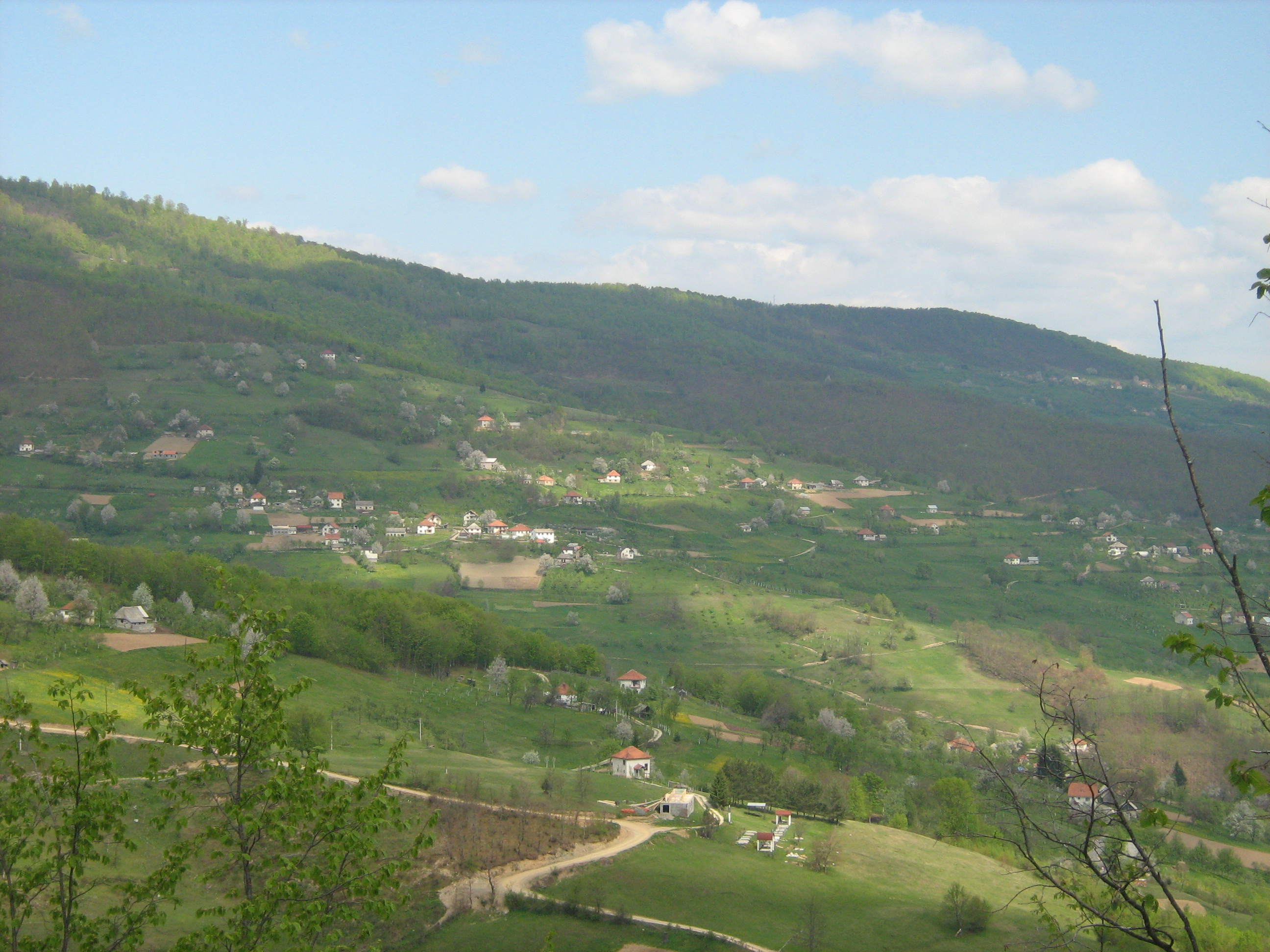
- View of Prijelozi Landscape

- Location within Montenegro
- Country: Montenegro
- Municipality: Bijelo Polje

Population (2011)
  - Total: 339
- Time zone: UTC+1 (CET)
  - Summer (DST): UTC+2 (CEST)

Prijelozi (Montenegrin: Пријелози) is a village in the municipality of Bijelo Polje, Montenegro.

== Demographics ==
According to the 2003 census, the village had a population of 411 people.

According to the 2011 census, its population was 339.

Ethnicity in 2011
Ethnicity	Number	Percentage
Serbs	208	61.4%
Montenegrins	97	28.6%
other/undeclared	34	10.0%
Total	339	100%
