= Kičava =

- Village
- Location within Montenegro
- Country: Montenegro
- Municipality: Bijelo Polje

Population (2011)
  - Total: 43
- Time zone: UTC+1 (CET)
  - Summer (DST): UTC+2 (CEST)

Kičava (Montenegrin: Кичава) is a village in the municipality of Bijelo Polje, Montenegro.

== Demographics ==
According to the 2003 census, the village had a population of 118 people.

According to the 2011 census, its population was 43.

Ethnicity in 2011
Ethnicity	Number	Percentage
Serbs	25	58.1%
Montenegrins	13	30.2%
other/undeclared	5	11.6%
Total	43	100%
