= Kovren =

Kovren Коврен
- Village
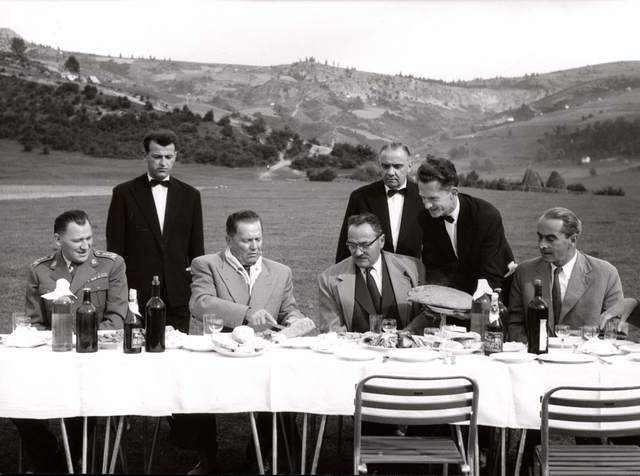
- President of Yugoslavia Josip Broz Tito in Kovren in 1959

- Location within Montenegro
- Country: Montenegro
- Municipality: Bijelo Polje

Population (2011)
  - Total: 95
- Time zone: UTC+1 (CET)
  - Summer (DST): UTC+2 (CEST)

Kovren (Montenegrin and Serbian Cyrillic: Коврен) is a small village in the municipality of Bijelo Polje, Montenegro.

== Demographics ==
According to the 2003 census, the village had a population of 411 people.

According to the 2011 census, its population was 95.

Ethnicity in 2011
Ethnicity	Number	Percentage
Serbs	72	75.8%
Montenegrins	16	16.8%
other/undeclared	7	7.4%
Total	95	100%
