= Stubo, Montenegro =

Stubo Стубо
- Village
- Location within Montenegro
- Country: Montenegro
- Municipality: Bijelo Polje

Population (2011)
  - Total: 55
- Time zone: UTC+1 (CET)
  - Summer (DST): UTC+2 (CEST)

Stubo (Montenegrin Cyrillic: Стубо) is a village in the municipality of Bijelo Polje, Montenegro.

== Demographics ==
According to the 2003 census, the village had a population of 82 people.

According to the 2011 census, its population was 55.

Ethnicity in 2011
Ethnicity	Number	Percentage
Bosniaks	11	20.0%
other/undeclared	44	80.0%
Total	55	100%
