= Vrh, Bijelo Polje =

Vrh Врх
- Village
- Location within Montenegro
- Country: Montenegro
- Municipality: Bijelo Polje

Population (2011)
  - Total: 34
- Time zone: UTC+1 (CET)
  - Summer (DST): UTC+2 (CEST)

Vrh (Montenegrin and Serbian Cyrillic: Врх) is a small village in the municipality of Bijelo Polje, Montenegro.

== Demographics ==
According to the 2003 census, the village had a population of 46 people.

According to the 2011 census, its population was 34.

Ethnicity in 2011
Ethnicity	Number	Percentage
Serbs	24	70.6%
other/undeclared	10	29.4%
Total	34	100%
