= Vuča, Rožaje =

Vuča Вуча Vuça
- Village
- Location within Montenegro
- Country: Montenegro
- Municipality: Rožaje

Population (2011)
  - Total: 418
- Time zone: UTC+1 (CET)
  - Summer (DST): UTC+2 (CEST)

Vuča (Serbian Cyrillic: Вуча; Albanian: Vuça) is a village in the municipality of Rožaje, Montenegro. It is located at the Serbian border.

== Demographics ==
According to the 2011 census, its population was 418.

Ethnicity in 2011
| Ethnicity | Number | Percentage |
|---|---|---|
| Bosniaks | 386 | 92.3% |
| Albanians | 24 | 5.7% |
| other/undeclared | 8 | 1.9% |
| Total | 418 | 100% |
