= Seid Hadžić =

Montenegrin politician

Seid Hadžić Сеид Хаџић

Leader of the Justice and Reconciliation Party in Montenegro

Personal details
- Born: 14 March 1986 (age 40) Rožaje, SR Montenegro, SFR Yugoslavia
- Party: Justice and Reconciliation Party
- Education: International University of Novi Pazar
- Profession: Politician

Seid Hadžić (Cyrillic: Сеид Хаџић; born 14 March 1986) is a Montenegrin politician serving as the president of the Justice and Reconciliation Party in Montenegro, minority party representing Bosniaks in Montenegro, succeeding Hazbija Kalač in 2022.
