= Ivanje, Bijelo Polje =

Ivanje Ивање
- Village
- Location within Montenegro
- Country: Montenegro
- Municipality: Bijelo Polje

Population (2011)
  - Total: 356
- Time zone: UTC+1 (CET)
  - Summer (DST): UTC+2 (CEST)

Ivanje (Montenegrin: Ивање) is a village in the municipality of Bijelo Polje, Montenegro.

== Demographics ==
According to the 2003 census, the village had a population of 465 people.

According to the 2011 census, its population was 356.

Ethnicity in 2011
Ethnicity	Number	Percentage
Serbs	178	50.0%
Bosniaks	106	29.8%
Montenegrins	29	8.1%
other/undeclared	43	12.1%
Total	356	100%
