= Muslići, Montenegro =

Muslići
- Village
- Country: Montenegro
- Municipality: Bijelo Polje

Population (2011)
  - Total: 273
- Time zone: UTC+1 (CET)
  - Summer (DST): UTC+2 (CEST)

Muslići (Montenegrin and Serbian Cyrillic: Муслићи) is a village in the municipality of Bijelo Polje, Montenegro.

== Demographics ==
According to the 2003 census, the village had a population of 289 people.

According to the 2011 census, its population was 273.

Ethnicity in 2011
Ethnicity	Number	Percentage
Serbs	191	70.0%
Montenegrins	75	27.5%
other/undeclared	7	2.6%
Total	273	100%
