= Marko Vešović (writer) =

Bosnian and Montenegrin writer (1945–2023)

- Born: 14 March 1945; Pape, Bijelo Polje, PR Montenegro, FPR Yugoslavia
- Died: 17 August 2023 (aged 78); Sarajevo, Bosnia and Herzegovina
- Education: University of Sarajevo, Faculty of Philosophy
- Occupations: Writer, essayist, literary critic and translator

Marko Vešović (Serbian Cyrillic: Марко Вешовић; 14 March 1945 – 17 August 2023) was a Bosnian and Montenegrin poet, writer, essayist, literary critic and translator.

== Biography ==
Born in March 1945 in the village of Pape near Bijelo Polje in Montenegro, Vešović attended high school in Bijelo Polje. He moved to Sarajevo for university studies at the Faculty of Philosophy, and then to Belgrade for postgraduate studies at the Faculty of Philology. He served as a teacher at the Sarajevo secondary traffic school and at the Pero Kosorić high school.

Vešović worked as assistant lecturer at the Faculty of Philosophy in Sarajevo from 1976 till 1986, then worked as an editor at the Veselin Masleša publishing house in Sarajevo. In 1992 he returned to the Faculty of Philosophy in Sarajevo.

At the very beginning of the war in Bosnia and Herzegovina, Vešović was accused by the media linked to Karadžić's SDS to be a traitor to the Serbian people. Vešović replied that Karadžić's crimes make people's minds stop and people's mouths turn to stone. He added: "admittedly, I am a Montenegrin, but whenever someone counts me as a Serb so that they can spit on me, I temporarily become a Serb as well".

Vešović lived in Sarajevo during the Bosnian War and is deemed among the most accurate chroniclers of the life of the citizens of Sarajevo under siege.

After the war he remained in Sarajevo, teaching as a professor at the Faculty of Philosophy, Department of Comparative Literature. He refused a post as member of the Presidency of Bosnia and Herzegovina, saying that he is not for politics, nor is politics for him.

His books include Poljska konjica (Polish Cavalry), about the siege of Sarajevo; Rastanak sa Arancanom (Farewell to Arenzano); and Knjiga žalbi (Book of Complaints). Among the most significant is the war prose Smrt je majstor iz Srbije (Death is a master from Serbia, 1994). In it, Vešović also describes his pre-war experiences with the war criminal Radovan Karadžić, once a fellow poet.

Vešović wrote columns in several Montenegrin and Bosnian newspapers, and published over 30 books of poetry and prose, poetry translations, essays and polemics.

After the 2006 Montenegrin independence referendum, Vešović wrote for the newspaper Pobjeda, in which he published scathing criticism of the opposition to Milo Đukanović. His work was subject to one of the biggest rulings for defamation in the Balkans. At one time he was the honorary president of the Liberal Alliance of Montenegro.

Marko Vešović died on 17 August 2023 in Sarajevo (Nedžarići), and was buried there, at the St. Joseph's Cemetery. He was 78. Upon his death Andrej Nikolaidis deemed him "the greatest living Montenegrin poet".
