= Dolac, Bijelo Polje =

Dolac Долац
- Village
- Location within Montenegro
- Country: Montenegro
- Municipality: Bijelo Polje

Population (2011)
  - Total: 94
- Time zone: UTC+1 (CET)
  - Summer (DST): UTC+2 (CEST)

Dolac (Montenegrin Cyrillic: Долац) is a village in the municipality of Bijelo Polje, Montenegro.

== Demographics ==
According to the 2003 census, the village had a population of 98 people.

According to the 2011 census, its population was 94.

Ethnicity in 2011
Ethnicity	Number	Percentage
Montenegrins	64	68.1%
other/undeclared	30	31.9%
Total	94	100%
