= Rokyta =

Rokyta may refer to places:

- Rokyta, Poltava Oblast, a village in Ukraine
- Rokytá, a municipality and village in the Czech Republic

== See also ==
- Rokita (disambiguation)
