= Ravna Rijeka =

- Village
- Location within Montenegro
- Country: Montenegro
- Municipality: Bijelo Polje

Population (2011)
  - Total: 397
- Time zone: UTC+1 (CET)
  - Summer (DST): UTC+2 (CEST)

Ravna Rijeka ({Montenegrin and Serbian: Равна Ријека) is a village in the municipality of Bijelo Polje, Montenegro.

== Demographics ==
According to the 2003 census, the village had a population of 848 people.

According to the 2011 census, its population was 397.

Ethnicity in 2011
Ethnicity	Number	Percentage
Serbs	252	63.5%
Montenegrins	121	30.5%
other/undeclared	24	6.0%
Total	397	100%
