= Lijeska, Bijelo Polje =

Lijeska
- Village
- Location within Montenegro
- Country: Montenegro
- Municipality: Bijelo Polje

Population (2011)
  - Total: 179
- Time zone: UTC+1 (CET)
  - Summer (DST): UTC+2 (CEST)

Lijeska (Montenegrin and Serbian Cyrillic: Лијеска) is a village in the municipality of Bijelo Polje, Montenegro.

== Demographics ==
According to the 2003 census, the village had a population of 269 people.

According to the 2011 census, its population was 179.

Ethnicity in 2011
Ethnicity	Number	Percentage
Serbs	101	56.4%
Montenegrins	74	41.3%
other/undeclared	4	2.2%
Total	179	100%
