= Kostenica, Montenegro =

Kostenica Костеница
- Village
- Location within Montenegro
- Country: Montenegro
- Municipality: Bijelo Polje

Population (2011)
  - Total: 109
- Time zone: UTC+1 (CET)
  - Summer (DST): UTC+2 (CEST)

Kostenica (Montenegrin Cyrillic: Костеница) is a village in the municipality of Bijelo Polje, Montenegro.

== Demographics ==
According to the 2003 census, the village had a population of 133 people.

According to the 2011 census, its population was 109.

Ethnicity in 2011
Ethnicity	Number	Percentage
Serbs	99	90.8%
other/undeclared	10	9.2%
Total	109	100%
