= Dobrinje, Visoko =

Dobrinje
- Village
- Location within Bosnia and Herzegovina
- Coordinates: 44.0488422°N 18.1106115°E
- Country: Bosnia and Herzegovina
- Entity: Federation of Bosnia and Herzegovina
- Canton: Zenica-Doboj
- Municipality: Visoko

Area
  - Total: 1.67 sq mi (4.32 km^{2})
- Elevation: 1,667 ft (508 m)

Population (2013)
  - Total: 407
  - Density: 244/sq mi (94.2/km^{2})
- Time zone: UTC+1 (CET)
  - Summer (DST): UTC+2 (CEST)

Dobrinje is a village in the municipality of Visoko, Zenica-Doboj Canton and Federation of Bosnia and Herzegovina. It is located on the northern banks of the River Bosna.

== Demographics ==
According to the 2013 census, its population was 407.

Ethnicity in 2013
Ethnicity	Number	Percentage
Bosniaks	326	80.1%
Croats	32	7.9%
Serbs	4	1.0%
other/undeclared	45	11.1%
Total	466	100%
