= Gornji Orahovac =

Gornji Orovac
- Village
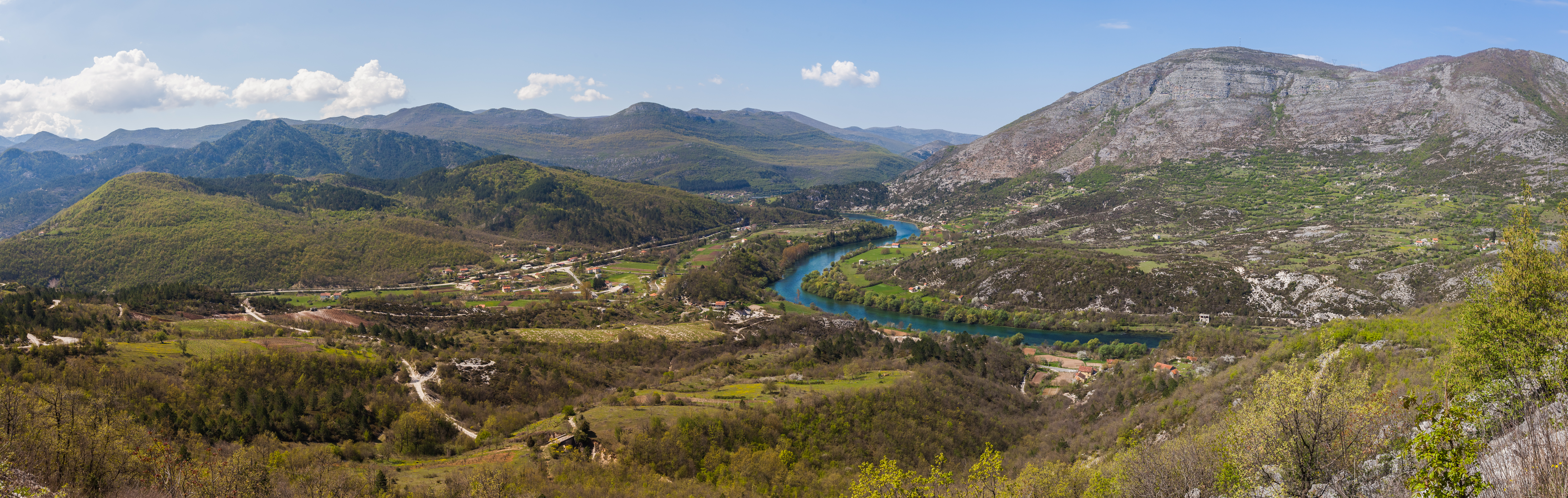
- Panoramic view on Gornji Orahovac area and the Trebišnjica valley

- Location within Bosnia and Herzegovina
- Coordinates: 42°40′13″N 18°29′45″E
- Country: Bosnia and Herzegovina
- Entity: Republika Srpska
- Municipality: Trebinje

Area
  - Total: 1.4 sq mi (3.5 km^{2})
- Elevation: 2,100 ft (640 m)
- Time zone: UTC+1 (CET)
  - Summer (DST): UTC+2 (CEST)
- Postal code: 89208
- Area code: +387 59

Gornji Orovac (Serbian Cyrillic: Горњи Оровац) is a village in the municipality of Trebinje, Republika Srpska, Bosnia and Herzegovina.
