= Barice, Montenegro =

Barice Барице
- Village
- Location within Montenegro
- Country: Montenegro
- Municipality: Bijelo Polje

Population (2011)
  - Total: 98
- Time zone: UTC+1 (CET)
  - Summer (DST): UTC+2 (CEST)

Barice (Montenegrin: Барице) is a village in the municipality of Bijelo Polje, Montenegro.

== Demographics ==
According to the 2003 census, the village had a population of 291.

According to the 2011 census, its population was 98.

Ethnicity in 2011
Ethnicity	Number	Percentage
Serbs	69	70.4%
Montenegrins	19	19.4%
other/undeclared	10	10.2%
Total	98	100%
