= Kostenica (Prokuplje) =

Coordinates: 43.3406°N 21.5467°E

Kostenica Костеница (Serbian)
- Village
- Interactive map of Kostenica
- Country: Serbia
- District: Toplica District
- Municipality: Prokuplje

Population (2002)
  - Total: 289
- Time zone: UTC+1 (CET)
  - Summer (DST): UTC+2 (CEST)

Kostenica is a village in the municipality of Prokuplje, Serbia. According to the 2002 census, the village has a population of 289 people.
