= Okladi =

- Village
- Location within Montenegro
- Country: Montenegro
- Municipality: Bijelo Polje

Population (2011)
  - Total: 56
- Time zone: UTC+1 (CET)
  - Summer (DST): UTC+2 (CEST)

Okladi (Montenegrin and Serbian Cyrillic: Оклади) is a village in the municipality of Bijelo Polje, Montenegro.

== Demographics ==
According to the 2003 census, the village had a population of 49 people.

According to the 2011 census, its population was 56.

Ethnicity in 2011
Ethnicity	Number	Percentage
Serbs	43	76.8%
Montenegrins	12	21.4%
other/undeclared	1	1.8%
Total	56	100%
