= Stubø =

Stubø is a surname. Notable people with the surname include:

- Eirik Stubø (born 1965), Norwegian stage producer and theatre director
- Håvard Stubø (born 1977), Norwegian guitarist and composer
- Kjersti Stubø (born 1970), Norwegian vocalist
- Mathias Stubø (born 1992), Norwegian musician and DJ
- Thorgeir Stubø (1943–1986), Norwegian guitarist and composer
