= Krš, Žabljak =

Krš Крш
- Village
- Location within Montenegro
- Coordinates: 43.126048°N 19.261363°E
- Country: Montenegro
- Region: Northern
- Municipality: Žabljak

Population (2011)
  - Total: 114
- Time zone: UTC+1 (CET)
  - Summer (DST): UTC+2 (CEST)

Krš (Montenegrin Cyrillic: Крш) is a village in the municipality of Žabljak, Montenegro.

== Demographics ==
According to the 2011 census, its population was 114.

Ethnicity in 2011
| Ethnicity | Number | Percentage |
|---|---|---|
| Serbs | 78 | 68.4% |
| Montenegrins | 33 | 28.9% |
| other/undeclared | 3 | 2.6% |
| Total | 114 | 100% |
