= Barice, Stari Grad =

Barice Барице
- Village
- Location within Bosnia and Herzegovina
- Coordinates: 43°53′21″N 18°26′47″E
- Country: Bosnia and Herzegovina
- Entity: Federation of Bosnia and Herzegovina
- Canton: Sarajevo
- Municipality: Stari Grad Sarajevo

Area
  - Total: 0.46 sq mi (1.19 km^{2})

Population (2013)
  - Total: 53
  - Density: 120/sq mi (45/km^{2})
- Time zone: UTC+1 (CET)
  - Summer (DST): UTC+2 (CEST)

Barice is a village in Bosnia and Herzegovina. According to the 1991 census, the village is located in the municipality of Stari Grad, Sarajevo.

== Demographics ==
According to the 2013 census, its population was 53.

Ethnicity in 2013
Ethnicity	Number	Percentage
Bosniaks	44	83.0%
Serbs	8	15.1%
other/undeclared	1	1.9%
Total	53	100%
