= Boturići, Serbia =

Coordinates: 43°27′27″N 20°58′14″E

Boturići
- Village
- Interactive map of Boturići
- Country: Serbia
- District: Šumadija
- Municipality: Aleksandrovac

Population (2002)
  - Total: 263
- Time zone: UTC+1 (CET)
  - Summer (DST): UTC+2 (CEST)

Boturići (Serbian Cyrillic: Ботурићи) is a village in the municipality of Aleksandrovac, Serbia. According to the 2002 census, the village has a population of 263.

== See also ==
- List of places in Serbia
