= Mioče, Bijelo Polje =

Mioče Mиoче
- Village
- Location within Montenegro
- Country: Montenegro
- Municipality: Bijelo Polje

Population (2011)
  - Total: 72
- Time zone: UTC+1 (CET)
  - Summer (DST): UTC+2 (CEST)

Mioče (Montenegrin and Serbian Cyrillic: Mиoче) is a village in Bijelo Polje Municipality, in northern Montenegro. According to the 2011 census, the village had a population of 72 people. It is situated below the Lisa mountain 1,503 m (4,931 ft). The population belongs to the historical tribes of Vasojevići, Moračani, Rovčani and others.

== Geography ==
Hamlets include:

- Brocanci
- Brotna Poljana
- Dobro Brdo
- Dobro Brdo
- Dolina
- Gornje Selo
- Iren
- Jedina Bukva
- Johovac
- Kozarevci
- Kucista
- Lisa
- Mahala
- Metalica
- Ograde
- Okrugla Njiva
- Osoje
- Ravni
- Vučja Jama
- Zakriževac
- Zebiće

Peaks include Radov Krš and Markov Kamen. Springs include Perišina Voda, Iren, Radovanovica and Jela. It is located 111 km (69 mi) from Podgorica.

== Demographics ==
Population history

- 1948 Population: 434
- 1953 Population: 465
- 1961 Population: 558
- 1971 Population: 652
- 1981 Population: 611
- 1991 Population: 429
- 2003 Population: 274
- 2011 Population: 72

Population, households and dwellings

- Population: 72
- Households: 31
- Dwellings: 52

Population by ethnicity

- Serbs: 35
- Monenegrins: 34
- Others: 3
- File:Mioce-Bijelo Polje Population by etnicity.pdf

Population by language

- Speak Serbian: 53
- Speak Montenegrin: 13
- Others: 6
- File:Mioce-Bijelo Polje Population by language.pdf

Population by religion

- Orthodox: 60
- Others: 12

== Sources ==
- Montenegrin Census' from 1909 to 2003 - Aleksandar Rakovic
- Bijelo Polje Municipality
- Uprava za statistiku Crne Gore - MONSTAT
