= Ostrelj, Montenegro =

Ostrelj Острељ
- Village
- Location within Montenegro
- Country: Montenegro
- Municipality: Bijelo Polje

Population (2011)
  - Total: 107
- Time zone: UTC+1 (CET)
  - Summer (DST): UTC+2 (CEST)

Ostrelj (Montenegrin and Serbian Cyrillic: Острељ) is a village in the municipality of Bijelo Polje, Montenegro.

== Demographics ==
According to the 2003 census, the village had a population of 364 people.

According to the 2011 census, its population was 107.

Ethnicity in 2011
Ethnicity	Number	Percentage
Serbs	91	85.0%
Montenegrins	14	13.1%
other/undeclared	2	1.9%
Total	107	100%
