= Godovo (Tutin) =

Godovo Годово
- Village (Selo)
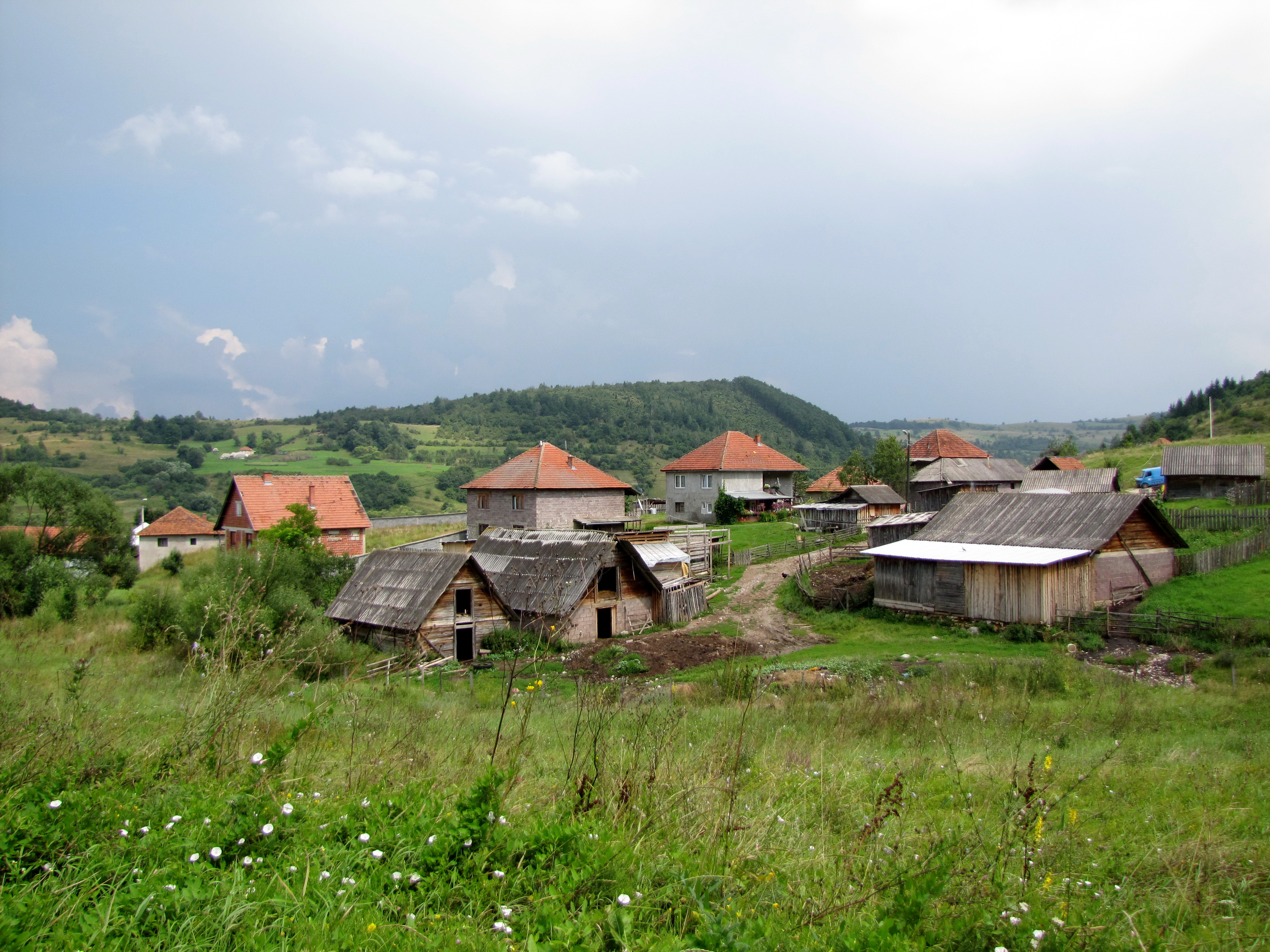
- Godovo Landscape

- Location within Serbia
- Coordinates: 42°56′54″N 20°18′03″E
- Country: Serbia
- District: Raška District
- Municipality: Tutin
- Elevation: 879 m (2,884 ft)

Population (2011)
  - Total: 124
- Time zone: UTC+1 (CET)
  - Summer (DST): UTC+2 (CEST)

Godovo (Serbian Cyrillic: Годово) is a village located in the municipality of Tutin, southwestern Serbia. According to the 2002 census, the village has a population of 124 inhabitants.
