= Dobrinja (Modriča) =

Dobrinja Добриња (Serbian)
- Village (Selo)
- Location within Bosnia and Herzegovina
- Coordinates: 44°56′29″N 18°18′34″E
- Country: Bosnia and Herzegovina
- Republic: Republika Srpska
- Municipality: Modriča

Population (1991)
  - Total: 437
- Time zone: UTC+1 (CET)
  - Summer (DST): UTC+2 (CEST)

Dobrinja (Cyrillic: Добриња) is a village in the municipality of Modriča, Republika Srpska, Bosnia and Herzegovina.
