= Bojišta, Montenegro =

Bojišta Бојишта
- Village
- Country: Montenegro
- Municipality: Bijelo Polje

Population (2011)
  - Total: 191
- Time zone: UTC+1 (CET)
  - Summer (DST): UTC+2 (CEST)

Bojišta (Montenegrin and Serbian Cyrillic: Бојишта) is a village in the municipality of Bijelo Polje, Montenegro.

== Demographics ==
According to the 2003 census, the village had a population of 194.

According to the 2011 census, its population was 191.

Ethnicity in 2011
Ethnicity	Number	Percentage
Serbs	114	59.7%
Montenegrins	70	36.6%
other/undeclared	7	3.7%
Total	191	100%
