= Rakita, Montenegro =

Rakita Ракита
- Village
- Location within Montenegro
- Country: Montenegro
- Municipality: Bijelo Polje

Population (2011)
  - Total: 102
- Time zone: UTC+1 (CET)
  - Summer (DST): UTC+2 (CEST)

Rakita (Montenegrin and Serbian Cyrillic: Ракита) is a village in the municipality of Bijelo Polje, Montenegro.

== Demographics ==
According to the 2003 census, the village had a population of 120 people.

According to the 2011 census, its population was 102.

Ethnicity in 2011
Ethnicity	Number	Percentage
Serbs	58	56.9%
Montenegrins	38	37.3%
other/undeclared	6	5.9%
Total	102	100%
