= Rokita =

Surname

Rokita is a surname. Notable people with the surname include:

- Anna Rokita (born 1986), Austrian speed skater
- Antoni Rokita (1909–1963), Polish wrestler
- Jan Rokita (born 1959), Polish politician
- Nelli Rokita (born 1957), Polish politician
- Todd Rokita (born 1970), American congressman
- Zbigniew Rokita, writer

== See also ==
- Rakita (disambiguation)
