= Femića Krš =

- Village
- Location within Montenegro
- Country: Montenegro
- Municipality: Bijelo Polje

Population (2011)
  - Total: 191
- Time zone: UTC+1 (CET)
  - Summer (DST): UTC+2 (CEST)

Femića Krš (Montenegrin and Serbian Cyrillic: Фемића Крш) is a village in the municipality of Bijelo Polje, Montenegro.

== Demographics ==
According to the 2003 census, the village had a population of 522 people.

According to the 2011 census, its population was 191.

Ethnicity in 2011
Ethnicity	Number	Percentage
Serbs	145	75.9%
Montenegrins	41	21.5%
other/undeclared	5	2.6%
Total	191	100%
