= Dubovo, Vladimir Oblast =

Dubovo Дубово
- Village
- Location within Vladimir Oblast Location within Russia
- Coordinates: 56°08′N 42°21′E
- Country: Russia
- Region: Vladimir Oblast
- District: Gorokhovetsky District
- Time zone: UTC+3:00

Dubovo (Russian: Дубово) is a rural locality (a village) in Denisovskoye Rural Settlement, Gorokhovetsky District, Vladimir Oblast, Russia. The population was 15 as of 2010.

== Geography ==
Dubovo is located 34 km southwest of Gorokhovets (the district's administrative centre) by road. Novosemenovka is the nearest rural locality.
