= Dubová =

Dubová may refer to:

- Dubová, Pezinok District in the Pezinok District, Slovakia
- Dubová, Svidník District in the Svidník District, Slovakia
