= Gruban Malić =

Gruban Malić is a fictional character and the anti-hero in Miodrag Bulatović's novel Heroj na magarcu ili Vreme srama (Hero on a Donkey). Scholar Vasa D. Mihailovic has described the character as a "tragicomical anti-hero" and is "a combination of Don Quixote and Soldier Schweik, without the sad resignation of the former and the wisecracking of the latter."

Malić received media attention due to a 1995 hoax that began with Yugoslavian war correspondent Nebojša Jevrić began telling an American journalist about a war criminal by the name of Gruban Malić, who had committed the most rapes while serving as a guard at the Omarska camp. The story of Malić spread and culminated in Judge Richard Goldstone and the International Criminal Tribunal for the Former Yugoslavia including the character on a list of Serbian war criminals. After the list was made public the hoax was quickly detected but the charges against the character were not dropped until 1998. Jevrić later published a book about the hoax, Hero on a Donkey Goes to The Hague.

== Footnotes ==
1. Tihomir Brajović: Autsajderska paradigma i rat
2. International Criminal Tribunal for the Former Yugoslavia: CASE NO. IT-95-4-I
3. International Criminal Tribunal for the Former Yugoslavia: CC/PIU/314-E
