= Sait Orahovac =

Bosniak writer and folklorist

- Born: 24 May 1909; Podgorica, Principality of Montenegro
- Died: 21 November 1992 (aged 83); Sarajevo, Republic of Bosnia and Herzegovina

Sait Orahovac (24 May 1909 – 21 November 1992) was a Bosniak writer and folklorist.

Orahovac was born in Podgorica, Montenegro in 1909.
