= Bijelo Polje Municipality =

Bijelo Polje Municipality Opština Bijelo Polje Општина Бијело Поље
- Municipality
- Coat of arms

- Bijelo Polje Municipality in Montenegro
- Country: Montenegro
- Seat: Bijelo Polje

Area
  - Total: 924 km^{2} (357 sq mi)

Population (2023)
  - Total: 38,662
  - Density: 41.8/km^{2} (108/sq mi)
- Area code: +382 50
- ISO 3166-2 code: ME-04
- Car plates: BP
- Website: www.bijelopolje.co.me

Bijelo Polje Municipality (Montenegrin: Opština Bijelo Polje, Општина Бијело Поље) is one of the municipalities of Montenegro, and is located in northern Montenegro, in the Lim river valley. Its administrative centre is the town of Bijelo Polje and it covers an area of 924 km^{2}. In 2023, the Bijelo Polje Municipality had a population of 38,662.

== Transport ==
=== Road ===
Bijelo Polje is connected to the rest of Montenegro by two major roads. It is situated on the main road connecting Montenegro's coast and Podgorica with northern Montenegro and Serbia (E65, E80).

=== Rail ===
Bijelo Polje also has a train station along the Belgrade–Bar railway. It is the last station in Montenegro for northbound trains heading for Belgrade, and it serves as a regional train station. Podgorica Airport is 130 km (81 mi) away, and has regular flights to major destinations.

=== City Assembly (2022–2026) ===
Name	Seats	Local government
DPS	11 / 37	Government
BS	4 / 37	Opposition
ZBCG (NSD–DNP)	4 / 37	Opposition
PES	3 / 37	Opposition
DCG	3 / 37	Opposition
SNP	2 / 37	Opposition
SDP	2 / 37	Government
SD	2 / 37	Government
URA	1 / 37	Opposition
PzP	1 / 37	Opposition
UCG	1 / 37	Opposition
GPLJT	1 / 37	Opposition

== Population ==
According to the 2023 census, the municipality of Bijelo Polje had a population of 38,662.

Historical population
Year	Pop.	±%
1948	36,795	—
1953	41,432	+12.6%
1961	46,651	+12.6%
1971	52,598	+12.7%
1981	55,634	+5.8%
1991	55,268	−0.7%
2003	50,284	−9.0%
2011	46,051	−8.4%
2023	38,662	−16.0%

=== Ethnicity ===
Source: Statistical Office of Montenegro - MONSTAT, Census 2023

Ethnicity	Number	Percentage
Serbs	16,675	43.13%
Bosniaks	12,315	31.85%
Montenegrins	5,751	14.88%
Muslims	2,916	7.54%
Others	1,005	2.6%
Total	38,662	100%

=== Religion ===
Source: Statistical Office of Montenegro - MONSTAT, Census 2023

Religion	Number	Percentage
Eastern Orthodox	20,956	54.20%
Islam	17,202	44.49%
Roman Catholic	69	0.18%
Atheist	92	0.24%
Other	249	0.65%
Undeclared	186	0.48%

== Settlements ==
- Babaići
- Barice
- Bijedići
- Bijelo Polje
- Bliškovo
- Bojišta
- Boljanina
- Boturići
- Cerovo
- Crhalj
- Crniš
- Crnča
- Dobrakovo
- Dobrinje
- Dolac
- Dubovo
- Džafića Brdo
- Femića Krš
- Godijevo
- Goduša
- Grab
- Grančarevo
- Gubavač
- Ivanje
- Jablanovo
- Jabučno
- Jagoče
- Kanje
- Kičava
- Korita
- Kostenica
- Kostići
- Kovren
- Kukulje
- Laholo
- Lazovići
- Lekovina
- Lijeska
- Lješnica
- Lozna
- Loznica
- Majstorovina
- Metanjac
- Mioče
- Mirojevići
- Mojstir
- Mokri Lug
- Muslići
- Nedakusi
- Negobratina
- Njegnjevo
- Obrov
- Okladi
- Orahovica
- Osmanbegovo Selo
- Ostrelj
- Pali
- Pape
- Pavino Polje
- Pećarska
- Pobretići
- Pod
- Potkrajci
- Potrk
- Požeginja
- Prijelozi
- Pripčići
- Radojeva Glava
- Radulići
- Rakita
- Rakonje
- Rasovo
- Rastoka
- Ravna Rijeka
- Resnik
- Rodijelja
- Sadići
- Sela
- Sipanje
- Sokolac
- Srđevac
- Stožer
- Stubo
- Tomaševo
- Trubine
- Ujniče
- Unevine
- Voljavac
- Vrh
- Zaton
- Zminac
- Čeoče
- Čokrlije
- Đalovići
- Šipovice
- Žiljak
- Žurena

== Gallery ==
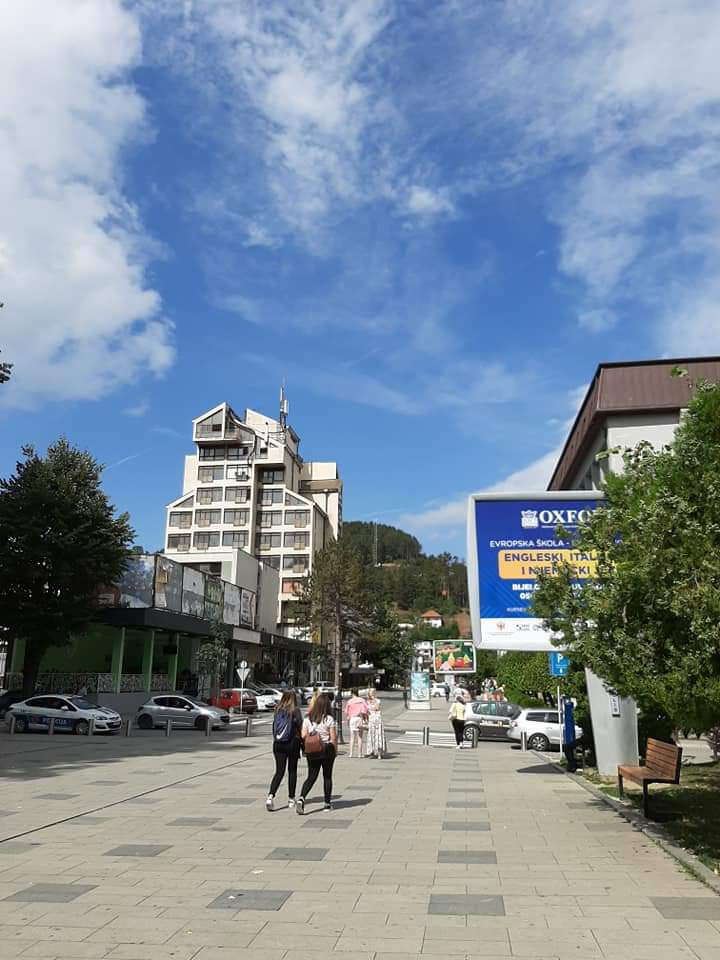
Town of Bijelo Polje, Montenegro

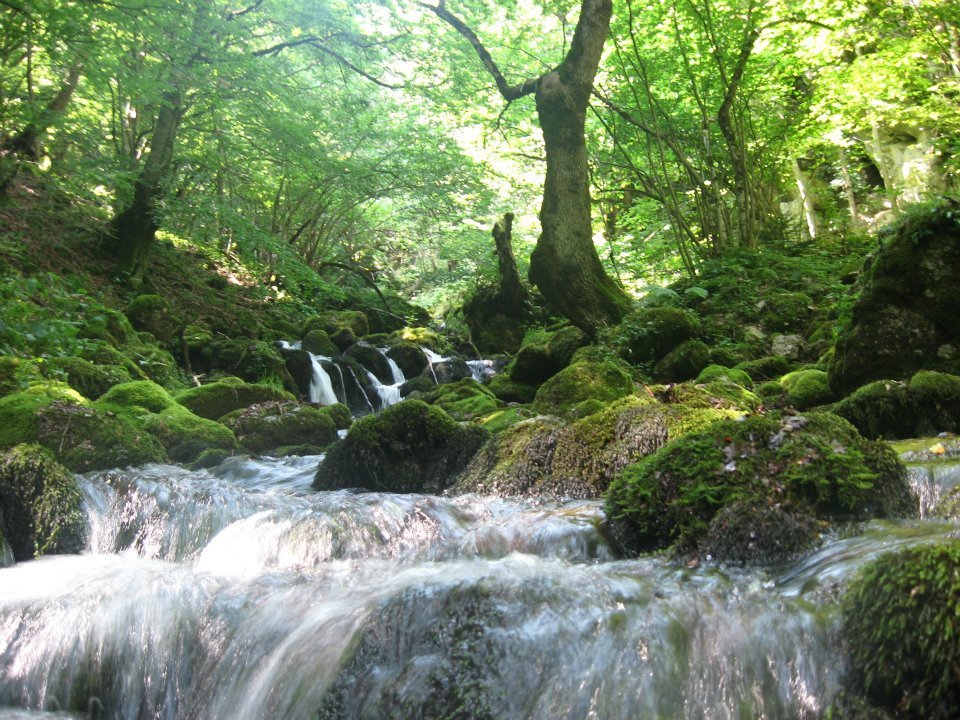
Lještanica river near Bijelo Polje

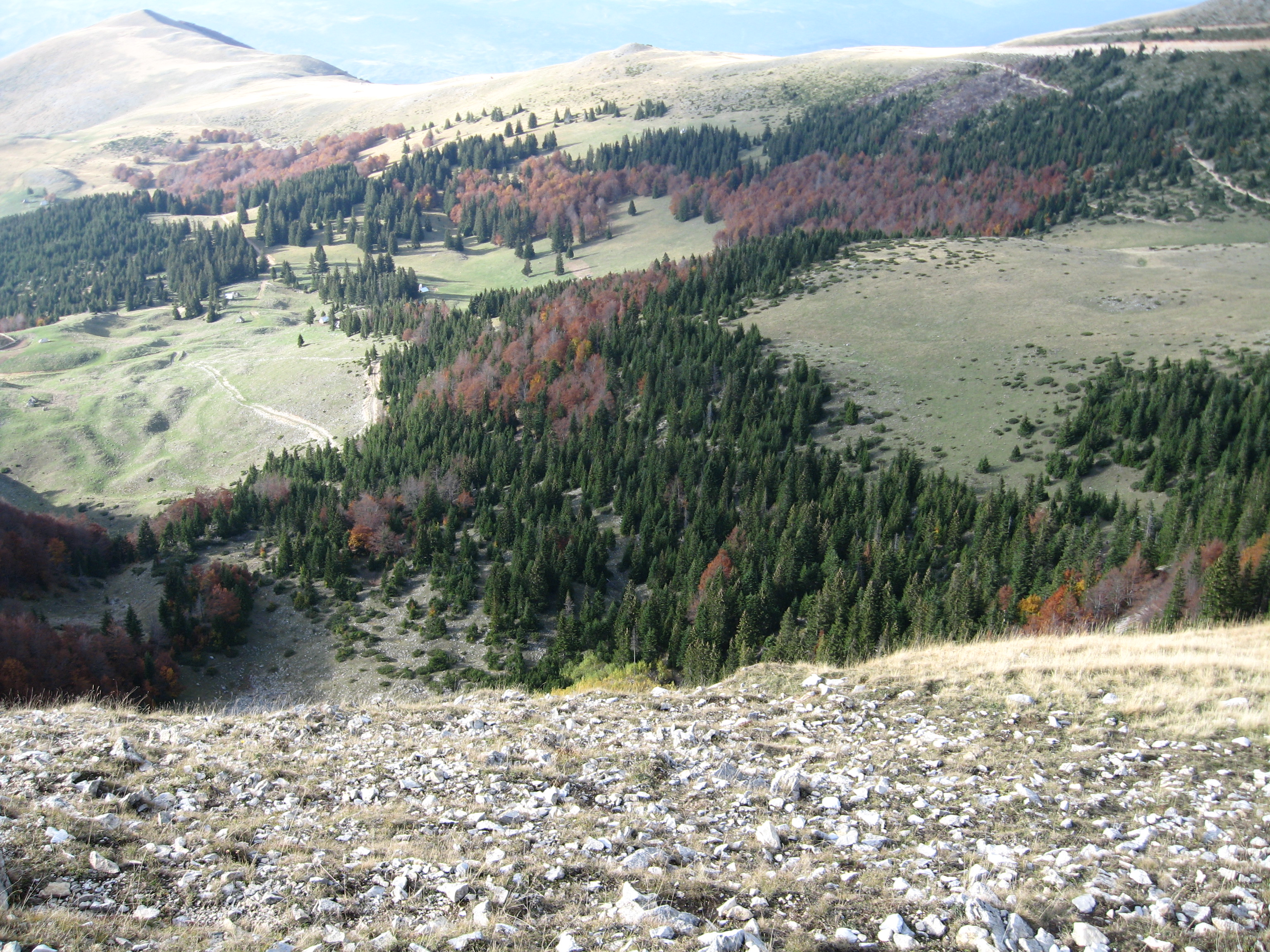
Bjelasica, Bijelo Polje Municipanity

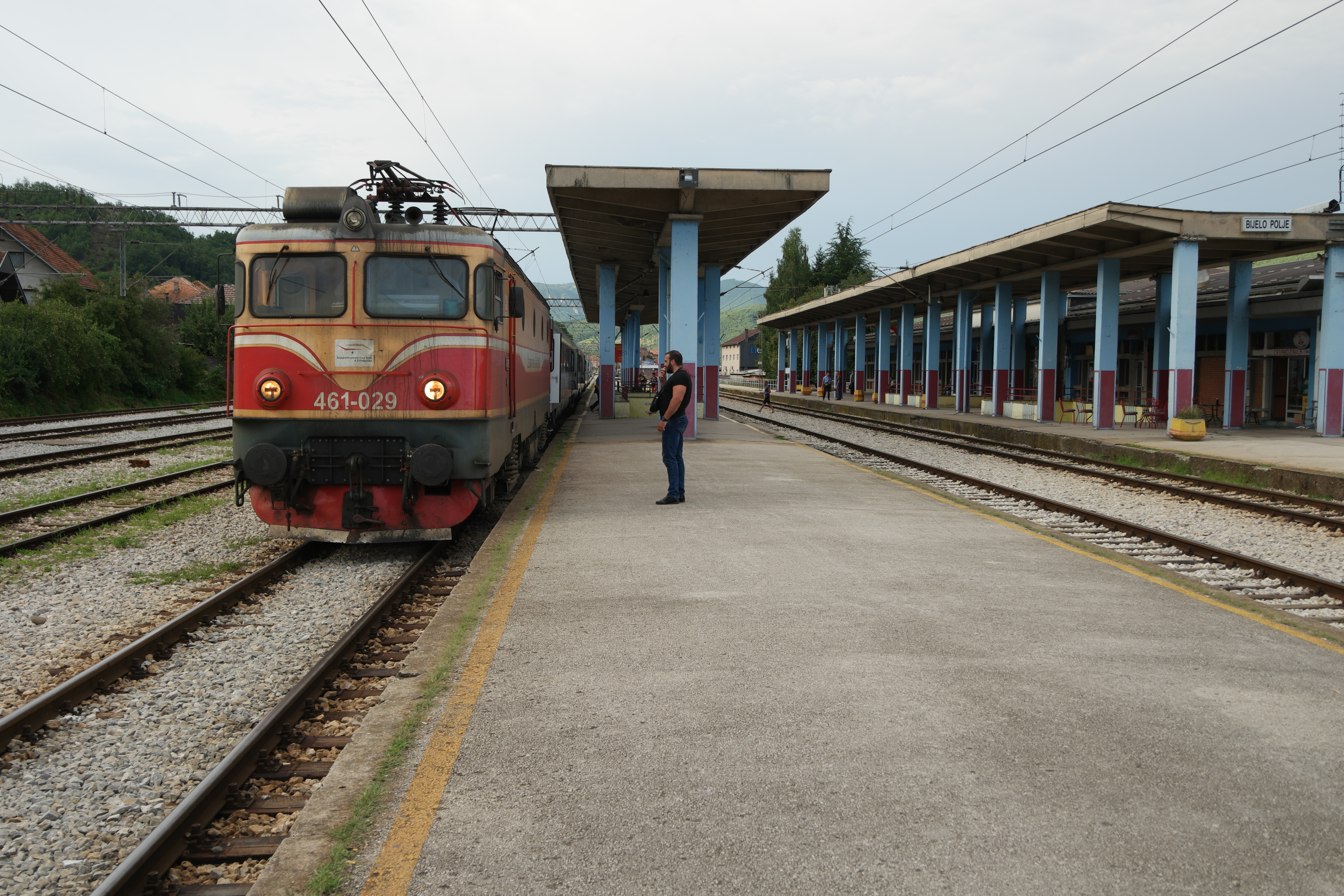
Bijelo Polje railway station
