= Bosniaks of Montenegro =

Bosniaks of Montenegro Bošnjaci u Crnoj Gori Бошњаци у Црној Гори
- The national flag of the Bosniaks of Sandžak

Total population
- 58,956 (2023 census)

Regions with significant populations
- Rožaje Municipality (84.66%); Petnjica Municipality (83.96%); Plav Municipality (65.64%); Gusinje Municipality (57.13%); Bijelo Polje Municipality (31.85%); Tuzi Municipality (13.65%)

Languages
- Bosnian, Montenegrin

Religion
- Sunni Islam

Related ethnic groups
- Other South Slavs

Bosniaks are an ethnic minority in Montenegro, first introduced in the 2003 census. According to the last census from 2023, the total number of Bosniaks in Montenegro was 58,956 or 9.45% of the population. Bosniaks are the third largest ethnic group in the country, after Montenegrins and Serbs. Ethnic Bosniaks comprise over 35% of Montenegrin citizens living and working abroad, making them by far the largest group of Montenegrin nationals outside of the country.

== Demographics ==
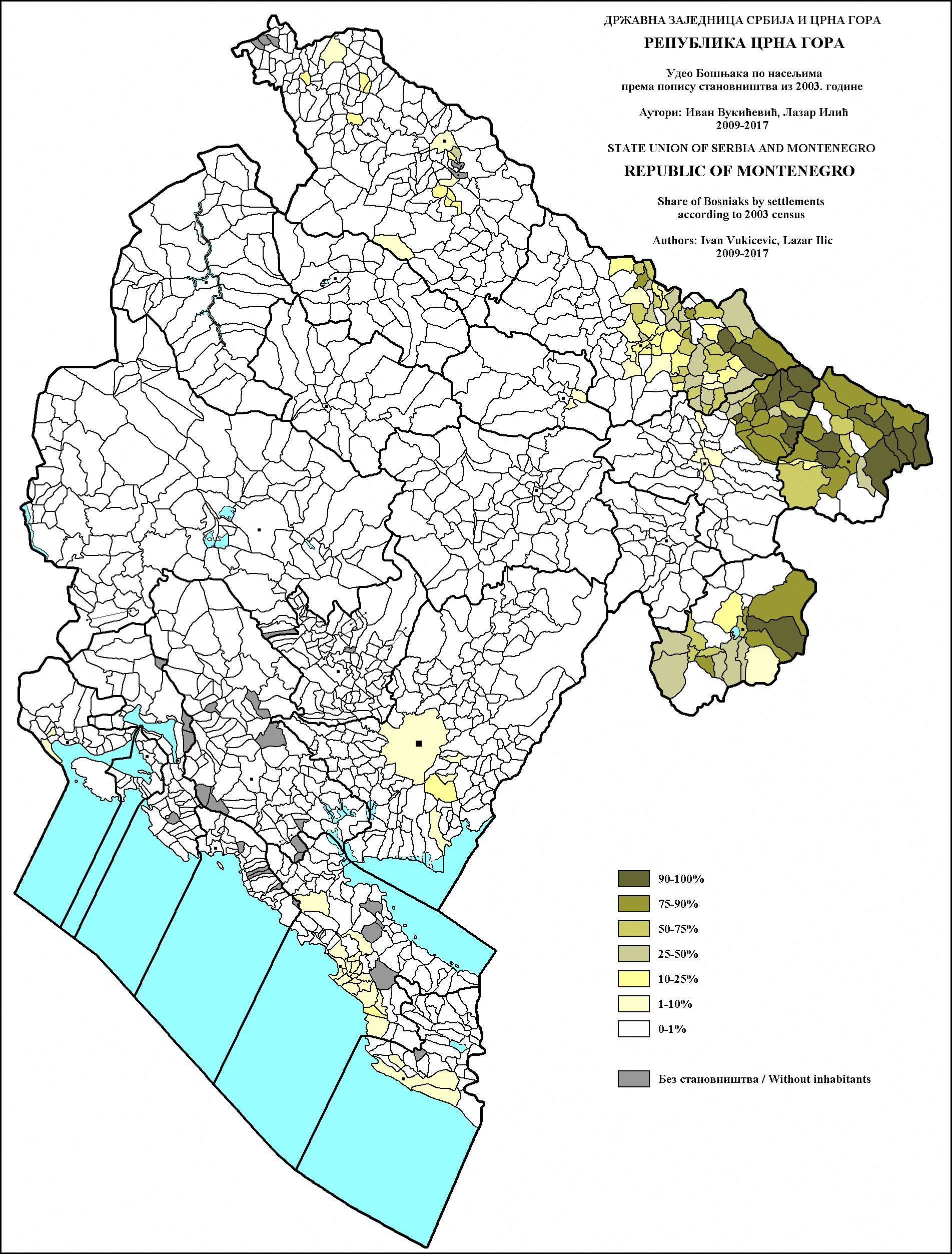
Share of Bosniaks in Montenegro by settlements 2003.

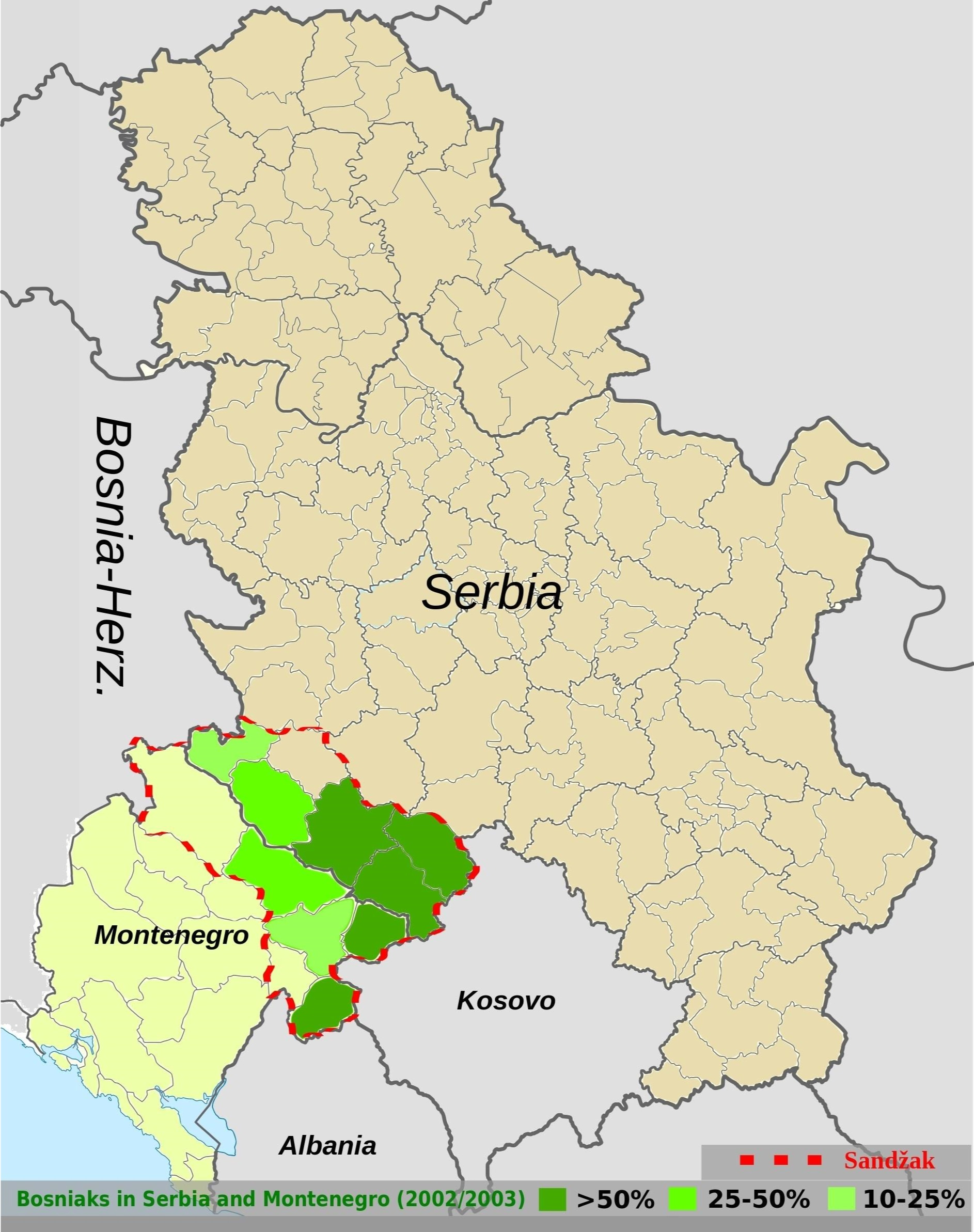
Bosniaks of Serbia and Montenegro within the divided Sandžak region (dashed red line).

Bosniaks primarily live in the Sandžak area of northern Montenegro, and form the majority of the population in four municipalities: Rožaje (84.7%), Petnjica (84%), Plav (65.6%) and Gusinje (57.1%).

== Politics ==
- The main political party of Bosniaks is the Bosniak Party (BS), led by Ervin Ibrahimović. The party currently has three seats in Parliament of Montenegro.
- There is also the Justice and Reconciliation Party in Montenegro (SPP u Crnoj Gori), led by Hazbija Kalač.

The majority of Bosniaks of Montenegro were in favor of Montenegrin independence during the independence referendum in 2006.

== Dialect ==
The Bosnian dialects of Gusinje and Plav show a very high structural influence from Albanian, due to the proximity of the Bosniak and Albanian populations in that area.

== Religion ==
Today, the majority of Bosniaks are predominantly Sunni Muslim and adhere to the Hanafi school of thought/jurisprudence, the largest and oldest school of jurisprudence within Sunni Islam.

== Notable people ==
Notable Bosniaks from Montenegro, past and present, include:

=== Film ===
- Izudin Bajrović, actor

=== Music ===
- Danijel Alibabić, singer
- Senida Hajdarpašić, singer
- Dado Polumenta, singer
- Šako Polumenta, singer
- Ekrem Jevrić, singer

=== Literature ===
- Sait Orahovac, writer
- Faruk Međedović, writer

=== Science ===
- Šerbo Rastoder, historian

=== Politics ===
- Rifat Rastoder, politician, writer and journalist
- Rafet Husović, politician
- Selmo Cikotić, Bosnian politician
- Ervin Ibrahimović, politician
- Mevludin Nuhodžić, politician
- Seid Hadžić, politician

=== Entrepreneurs ===
- Fahrudin Radončić, entrepreneur and politician

=== Sports ===
- Refik Šabanadžović, former footballer
- Sead Šehović, basketball player
- Suad Šehović, basketball player
- Elsad Zverotić, footballer
- Damir Čakar, former footballer
- Dženan Pejčinović, footballer
- Dženan Radončić, former footballer
- Sead Hakšabanović, footballer
- Mirsad Huseinović, former footballer in the U.S.
- Majda Mehmedović, handball player
- Fuad Muzurović, former Bosnian footballer
- Ajsel Kujović, former Swedish footballer
- Emir Kujović, Swedish footballer
- Dino Radončić, basketball player
- Elsad Zverotić, former footballer
- Derviš Hadžiosmanović, football coach and former player
- Arian Sadiković, kickboxer
- Refik Šabanadžović, former footballer
- Anel Šabanadžović, footballer
- Emir Spahić, footballer
- Izet Hajrović, footballer
- Emir Azemović, footballer
- Armin Bošnjak, footballer
- Tarik Hadžić, alpine skier
- Sead Hajrović, footballer
- Alma Hasanić Grizović, handball player
- Ferid Idrizović, former footballer
- Dino Islamović, footballer
- Emrah Klimenta, footballer
- Edvin Muratović, footballer
- Fuad Muzurović, football manager and former player
- Adnan Orahovac, footballer
- Dženan Radončić, footballer
- Ermin Seratlić, footballer
- Aldin Skenderović, footballer
- Dževad Turković, footballer
- Elsad Zverotić, footballer

=== Religion ===
- Hafiz Abdurahman Kujević, professor at IU Novi Pazar and W madrasa
- Sead Nasufović, Bosniak Islamic cleric and Grand Mufti of Serbia

=== Other ===
- Sabiha Gökçen, aviator
- Osman Rastoder, commander of the Muslim militia

== See also ==
- Bosniaks
- Bosniaks of Serbia
- Islam in Montenegro
- Sandžak
