= Ivangrad District =

Coordinates: 42°51′N 19°52′E

Ivangrad District Ivangradski srez Иванградски срез
- District of Montenegro
- Interactive map of Ivangrad District
- Country: Montenegro
- Administrative centre: Ivangrad

Government
  - Commissioner: n/a
- Municipalities: 9
- Cities and towns: 9

The Ivangrad District (Montenegrin: Ivangradski srez / Иванградски срез) was a former district within Montenegro. The administrative centre of the Ivangrad District was Ivangrad (modern-day Berane).

== Municipalities ==
The district encompassed the municipalities of:

- Andrijevica
- Bijelo Polje
- Gusinje
- Ivangrad
- Lozna
- Mojkovac
- Petnjica
- Plav
- Rožaje
- Tomaševo

== See also ==
- List of former municipalities of Montenegro
- Administrative divisions of Montenegro
