= Berane (disambiguation) =

Berane, formerly Ivangrad, is a city located in Montenegro.

Berane, Beranes, Beranci or Berani may also refer to:

== Places ==
- Berane Municipality, a municipality whose center is Berane, Montenegro.
- Beran Selo, a village located in Berane, Montenegro.
- Beranovac, a place located in Kraljevo, Serbia.
- Beranci, a village in the Moglia municipality of Macedonia.
- Beranes, a place in Spain.
- Berani, a place in Pakistan.
- Long Beraneh, a place in India.

== Other ==
- Beranska gimnazija, famous high school in Berane, Montenegro.
- Berane Airport, a disfunt airport in Berane, Montenegro.
- FK Berane, a football club located in Berane, Montenegro.
- RK Berane, a handball club located in Berane, Montenegro.
- Gradski stadion (Berane), a football stadium located in Berane, Montenegro.
