= R-12 regional road (Montenegro) =

Road in Montenegro

R-12 regional road
- Regionalni put R-12

Route information
- Length: 36.3 km (22.6 mi)

Major junctions
- West end: M-5 in Budimlja
- East end: M-5 in Kalače

Location
- Country: Montenegro
- Municipalities: Berane, Petnjica, Rožaje

Highway system
- Transport in Montenegro; Motorways
| ← R-11 | → R-12.1 |

R-12 regional road (Montenegrin: Regionalni put R-12) (previously known as R-20 regional road) is a Montenegrin roadway.

It serves as the best road connection to Petnjica Municipality and can be used as alternative to M-5 highway.

== History ==
In January 2016, the Ministry of Transport and Maritime Affairs published bylaw on categorisation of state roads. With new categorisation, R-20 regional road was renamed as R-12 regional road.

== Major intersections ==
| Municipality | Location | km | mi | Destinations | Notes |
|---|---|---|---|---|---|
| Berane | Budimlja | 0.0 | 0.0 | M-5 – Berane, Bijelo Polje, Andrijevica | |
| Rožaje | Kalače | 36.3 | 22.6 | M-5 – Rožaje | |
1.000 mi = 1.609 km; 1.000 km = 0.621 mi
