= M-5 highway (Montenegro) =

Highway in Montenegro

M-5 highway
- Magistralni put M-5

Route information
- Part of E-65 / E-80
- Length: 77.7 km (48.3 mi)
- Existed: 1971–present

Major junctions
- West end: M-2 / E-763 in Ribarevine

- R-2 in Berane; R-12 in Budimlja; R-12 in Kalače; R-5 in Rožaje; R-6 in Most Zeleni (Rožaje)
- East end: 22 / E65 / E80 in Dračenovac (border with Serbia)

Location
- Country: Montenegro
- Municipalities: Herceg Novi, Kotor, Budva, Bar, Podgorica, Kolašin, Mojkovac, Bijelo Polje, Berane, Rožaje

Highway system
- Transport in Montenegro; Motorways
← M-4	→ M-6

M-5 highway (Montenegrin: Magistralni put M-5) (formerly part of M-2 highway east of Ribarevine) is a Montenegrin roadway.

== History ==
The M-5 highway was part of historical M-2 highway in Montenegro. Construction on this highway began in 1953 and finished in 1971.

In January 2016, the Ministry of Transport and Maritime Affairs published bylaw on categorisation of state roads. With new categorisation, part of previous M-2 highwaywas designated as M-5 highway.

== Major intersections ==
Municipality	Location	km	mi	Destinations	Notes
Bijelo Polje	Ribarevine	0.0	0.0	M-2 / E-65 / E-80 / E-763 – Bijelo Polje, Mojkovac, Prijepolje (Serbia)	Western end of E 65 concurrency Western end of E 80 concurrency
Berane	Berane	27.3	17.0	R-2 – Andrijevica	
Berane	Budimlja	28.4	17.6	R-12 – Petnjica	
Rožaje	Kalače	50.0	31.1	R-12 – Petnjica	
Rožaje	Rožaje	58.4	36.3	R-5 – Dacići, Peć (Kosovo)	
Rožaje	Most Zeleni	59.4	36.9	R-6 – Vuča, Tutin (Serbia)	
Rožaje	Dračenovac	77.7	48.3	22 / E65 / E80 – Novi Pazar (Serbia)	Border crossing with Serbia; Eastern end of E 65 concurrency Eastern end of E 80 concurrency
1.000 mi = 1.609 km; 1.000 km = 0.621 mi: Concurrency terminus
