= Cetinje District =

Cetinje District Cetinjski srez Цетињски срез
- District of Montenegro
- Country: Montenegro
- Administrative centre: Cetinje

Government
  - Commissioner: n/a
- Municipalities: 10
- Cities and towns: 10

The Cetinje District (Montenegrin: Cetinjski srez / Цетињски срез) was a former district within Montenegro. The administrative centre of the Cetinje District was Cetinje.

== Municipalities ==
The district encompassed the municipalities of:

- Bar
- Budva
- Cetinje
- Herceg Novi
- Kotor
- Ostros
- Rijeka Crnojevića
- Tivat
- Ulcinj
- Virpazar

== See also ==
- Districts of Montenegro
- Administrative divisions of Montenegro
