= Nikšić District =

Coordinates: 42°50′N 18°48′E

Nikšić District Nikšićki srez Никшићки срез
- District of Montenegro
- Interactive map of Nikšić District
- Country: Montenegro
- Administrative centre: Nikšić

Government
  - Commissioner: n/a
- Municipalities: 6
- Cities and towns: 6

The Nikšić District (Montenegrin: Nikšićki srez / Никшићки срез) was a former district within Montenegro. The administrative centre of the Nikšić District was Nikšić.

== Municipalities ==
The district encompassed the municipalities of:

- Grahovo
- Krstac
- Nikšić
- Plužine
- Šavnik
- Velimlje

== See also ==
- Districts of Montenegro
- Administrative divisions of Montenegro
