= Titograd District =

Coordinates: 42°26′N 19°16′E

Titograd District Titogradski srez Титоградски срез
- District of Montenegro
- Interactive map of Titograd District
- Country: Montenegro
- Administrative centre: Titograd

Government
  - Commissioner: n/a
- Municipalities: 7
- Cities and towns: 7

The Titograd District (Montenegrin: Титоградски срез, romanized: Titogradski srez) is a former district within Montenegro. The administrative centre of the Titograd District was Titograd (modern-day Podgorica). Along with other cities (Veles, Drvar, Korenica, Vrbas, Mitrovica and Velenje), it was named in honor of Josip Broz Tito, former President of Yugoslavia from 1953 to 1980.

== History ==
=== Background ===
After the collapse of the Austro-Hungarian Empire, Podgorica became a part of the Kingdom of Serbs, Croats and Slovenes from 1918 to 1941 in the Zeta Oblast, then replaced by Zeta Banovina. It fell and was occupied by Nazi Germany during World War II, where it would be bombed over 80 times. The city was liberated on 19 May 1944 by the Yugoslav Partisans, after being bombed by the United States Army Air Force for 14 days prior in an attack against Axis forces.

=== Socialist Federal Republic of Yugoslavia ===
On 12 July 1946, Josip Broz Tito made one of his visits to Podgorica where he would hold his speech there, citing that the city would be rebuilt altogether because of their responsibility and the sacrifices the city had given.

On 25 July 1948, the vice president of the People's Parliament of Montenegro, Andrija Mugoša, along with secretary Gavron Cemović, signed a law changing the name of Podgorica into "Titovgrad". The law was "retroactively" activated such that the name change applied to any records starting from 13 July 1946, when it became the capital of Montenegro within the newly formed Socialist Federal Republic of Yugoslavia. However, in a contradiction, the "Službeni list" or legal code of Yugoslavia recorded the name "Titograd" without the letter "v". Ultimately, "Titograd" was used over "Titovgrad".

Adding to the new name, Titograd had seen large development, including the construction of the Radoje Dakić factory in 1946 for heavy machinery, the construction of the Kombinat plant in 1969 after a competition between Zadar and Mostar, and the foundation of the Public University "Veljko Vlahović" established in 1974 in the city.

=== Contemporary history ===
As Yugoslavia began to broke up, what was once Titograd was renamed to Podgorica after a referendum on 2 April 1992, returning to its old name and being succeeded by Podgorica Capital City.

== Municipalities ==
The district encompassed the municipalities of:

- Danilovgrad
- Golubovci
- Kolašin
- Lijeva Rijeka
- Manastir Morača
- Titograd
- Tuzi

== Demographics ==
Census population and growth rate (1948-1991)
Year	Pop.	±% p.a.
1948	377,189	—
1953	419,873	+2.17%
1961	529,604	+2.94%
1981	584,310	+0.49%
1991	615,035	+0.51%

The city had a steady growth from 377,189 to 615,035 with a 6.11% population increase from 1948 where after 1991 all population demographics was recorded as Podgorica demographics.

== See also ==
- Districts of Montenegro
- Administrative divisions of Montenegro
- Podgorica Capital City
