= R-12.1 regional road (Montenegro) =

Road in Montenegro

R-12.1 regional road
- Regionalni put R-12.1

Route information
- Length: 3.1 km (1.9 mi)

Major junctions
- West end: R-12 in Podvade
- East end: Petnjica

Location
- Country: Montenegro
- Municipalities: Petnjica

Highway system
- Transport in Montenegro; Motorways
← R-12	→ R-13

R-12.1 regional road (Montenegrin: Regionalni put R-12.1) is a Montenegrin roadway. It serves as connection from R-12 regional road to Petnjica

== History ==
In November 2019, the Government of Montenegro published bylaw on categorisation of state roads. With new categorisation, R-12.1 regional road was created from municipal road.

== Major intersections ==
Municipality	Location	km	mi	Destinations	Notes
Petnjica	Podvade	0.0	0.0	R-12 – Berane, Rožaje	
Petnjica	Petnjica	3.1	1.9		
1.000 mi = 1.609 km; 1.000 km = 0.621 mi
