= R-3 regional road (Montenegro) =

Road in Montenegro

R-3 regional road
- Regionalni put R-3

Route information
- Length: 40.3 km (25.0 mi)

Major junctions
- South-East end: M-6 in Pljevlja
- R-4 in Dajevića Han
- North-West end: R-I-5102 in Metaljka

Location
- Country: Montenegro
- Municipalities: Pljevlja

Highway system
- Transport in Montenegro; Motorways
← R-2	→ R-4

R-3 regional road (Montenegrin: Regionalni put R-3) is a Montenegrin roadway.

It serves as connection between Pljevlja and Bosnia and Herzegovina.

== History ==
In January 2016, the Ministry of Transport and Maritime Affairs published bylaw on categorisation of state roads. With new categorisation, new R-3 regional road on this route was established from previous municipal road.

== Major intersections ==
Municipality	Location	km	mi	Destinations	Notes
Pljevlja	Pljevlja	0.0	0.0	M-5 – Žabljak, Prijepolje (Serbia)	
Pljevlja	Dajevića Han	4.3	2.7	R-4 – Priboj (Serbia)	
Pljevlja	Metaljka	16.1	10.0	R-I-5102 Čajniče (RS, Bosnia and Herzegovina)	Border crossing with Bosnia and Herzegovina
1.000 mi = 1.609 km; 1.000 km = 0.621 mi
