= M-4.1 highway (Montenegro) =

Road in Montenegro

M-4.1 highway
- Magistralni put M-4.1
- R-5 regional road

Route information
- Length: 73.3 km (45.5 mi)

Major junctions
- South end: M-18 / E-762 In Jasenovo Polje

- R-18 in Šavnik; R-14 outside Žabljak
- North end: R-4 outside Rasova

Location
- Country: Montenegro
- Municipalities: Nikšić, Šavnik, Žabljak

Highway system
- Transport in Montenegro; Motorways
← M-4	→ M-6
← R-4	R-5	→ R-6

R-5 regional road
- Regionalni put R-5
- M4.1 regional road

Route information
- Length: 73.3 km (45.5 mi)

Major junctions
- South end: M-18 / E-762 In Jasenovo Polje

- R-18 in Šavnik; R-14 outside Žabljak
- North end: R-4 outside Rasova

Location
- Country: Montenegro
- Municipalities: Nikšić, Šavnik, Žabljak

Highway system
- Transport in Montenegro; Motorways
← R-4	→ R-6
← R-4	R-5	→ R-6

The M-4.1 Road, sometimes known as the old R-5 regional road, was a Montenegrin roadway. It was longer and better maintained then the old M-4 road. In January 2016, the Montenegrin road system changed and the M4.1 doesn't exist anymore.
