= Lješnica, Petnjica =

Coordinates: 42.8869°N 19.9039°E

Lješnica (Serbian Cyrillic: Љешница) is a settlement in Petnjica Municipality in northeastern Montenegro. It was formerly part of the Berane Municipality.
