= R-5 regional road (Montenegro) =

Regional roadway in Montenegro

R-5 regional road
- Regionalni put R-5

Route information
- Length: 23.1 km (14.4 mi)

Major junctions
- North end: M-5 in Rožaje
- South end: R106 near Kula

Location
- Country: Montenegro
- Municipalities: Rožaje

Highway system
- Transport in Montenegro; Motorways
← R-4	→ R-6

The R-5 regional road (Montenegrin: Regionalni put R-5) is a roadway in Montenegro.

It serves as a connection between Rožaje and Peć, Kosovo.

== History ==
In January 2016, the Ministry of Transport and Maritime Affairs published bylaw regarding the categorisation of state roads. This resulted in the renaming of the previous R-8 regional road to R-5 regional road.

== Major intersections ==
Municipality	Location	km	mi	Destinations	Notes
Rožaje	Rožaje	0.0	0.0	M-5 – Berane, Novi Pazar (Serbia)	
Rožaje	Kula	23.1	14.4	R106 near Kula - Peć (Kosovo)	Border crossing with Kosovo
1.000 mi = 1.609 km; 1.000 km = 0.621 mi
