= Beran Selo =

Beran Selo Беран Село
- Neighborhood
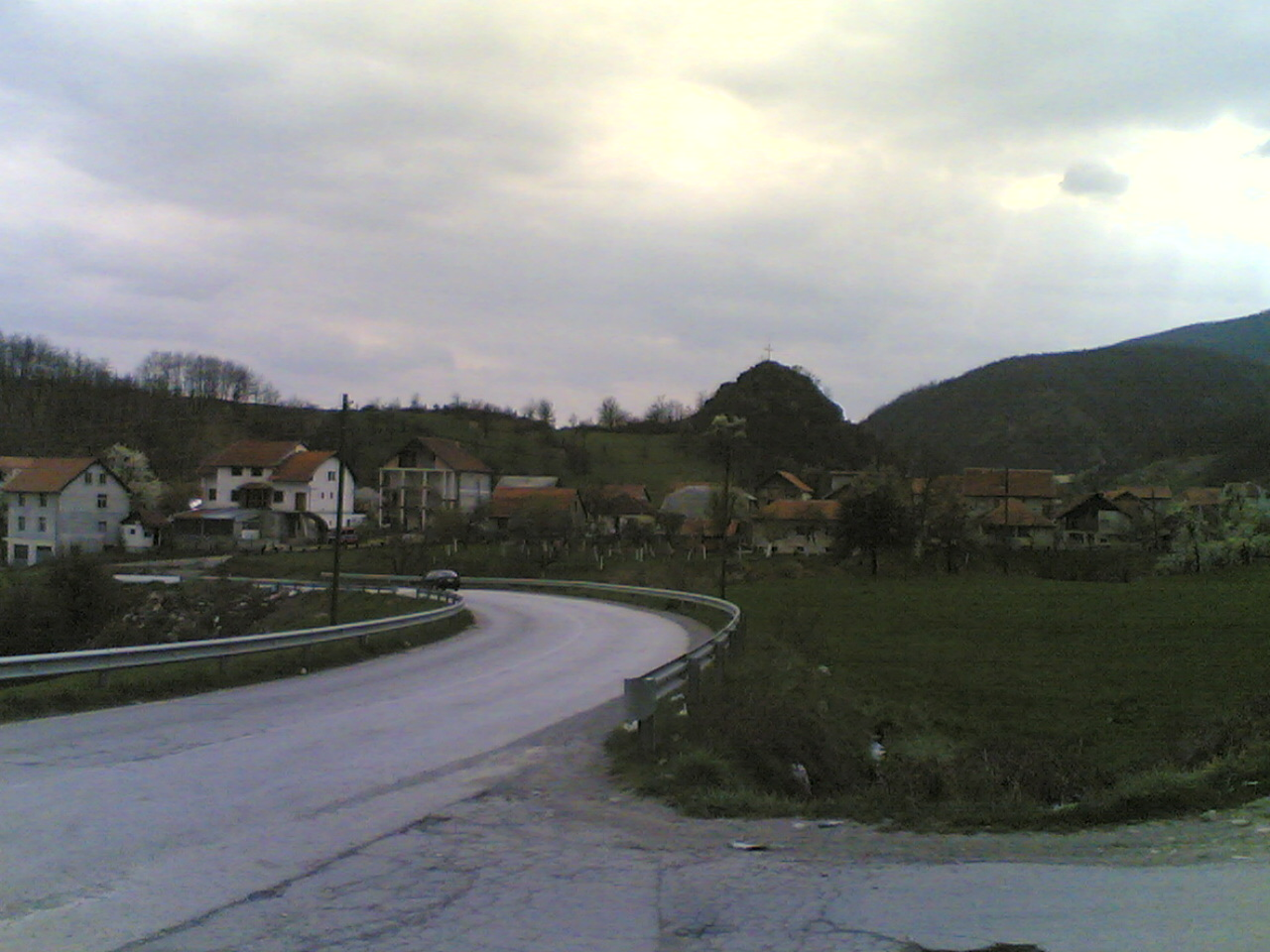

- Location within Montenegro
- Coordinates: 42°51′11″N 19°51′30″E
- Country: Montenegro
- Municipality: Berane

Population (2023)
  - Total: 1,504
- Time zone: UTC+1 (CET)
  - Summer (DST): UTC+2 (CEST)
- Postal code: 87000
- Area code: + 382(0)51
- Vehicle registration: BA

Beran Selo (Serbian Cyrillic: Беран Село) is a neighborhood of the city of Berane in north-eastern Montenegro.

== Demographics ==
According to the 2023 census, its population was 1,504.

Ethnicity in 2011
Ethnicity	Number	Percentage
Serbs	657	35.9%
Roma	424	23.1%
Montenegrins	356	19.4%
Bosniaks	179	9.8%
other/undeclared	81	5.7%
Total	1,832	100%

== Features ==
Beran Selo (or Beranselo) is the center of the Serb Orthodox Eparchy of Budimlje-Nikšić in Montenegro, because of monastery Đurđevi Stupovi.
