= Radmanci =

Radmanci Радманци
- Village
- Location within Montenegro
- Coordinates: 42.921673°N 19.965859°E
- Country: Montenegro
- Municipality: Petnjica

Population (2011)
  - Total: 365
- Time zone: UTC+1 (CET)
  - Summer (DST): UTC+2 (CEST)

Radmanci (Serbian Cyrillic: Радманци) is a village in the municipality of Petnjica, Montenegro.

== Demographics ==
According to the 2011 census, its population was 365.

Ethnicity in 2011
Ethnicity	Number	Percentage
Bosniaks	283	77.5%
Montenegrins	12	3.3%
other/undeclared	70	19.2%
Total	365	100%
