= Ali Daci =

Albanian writer

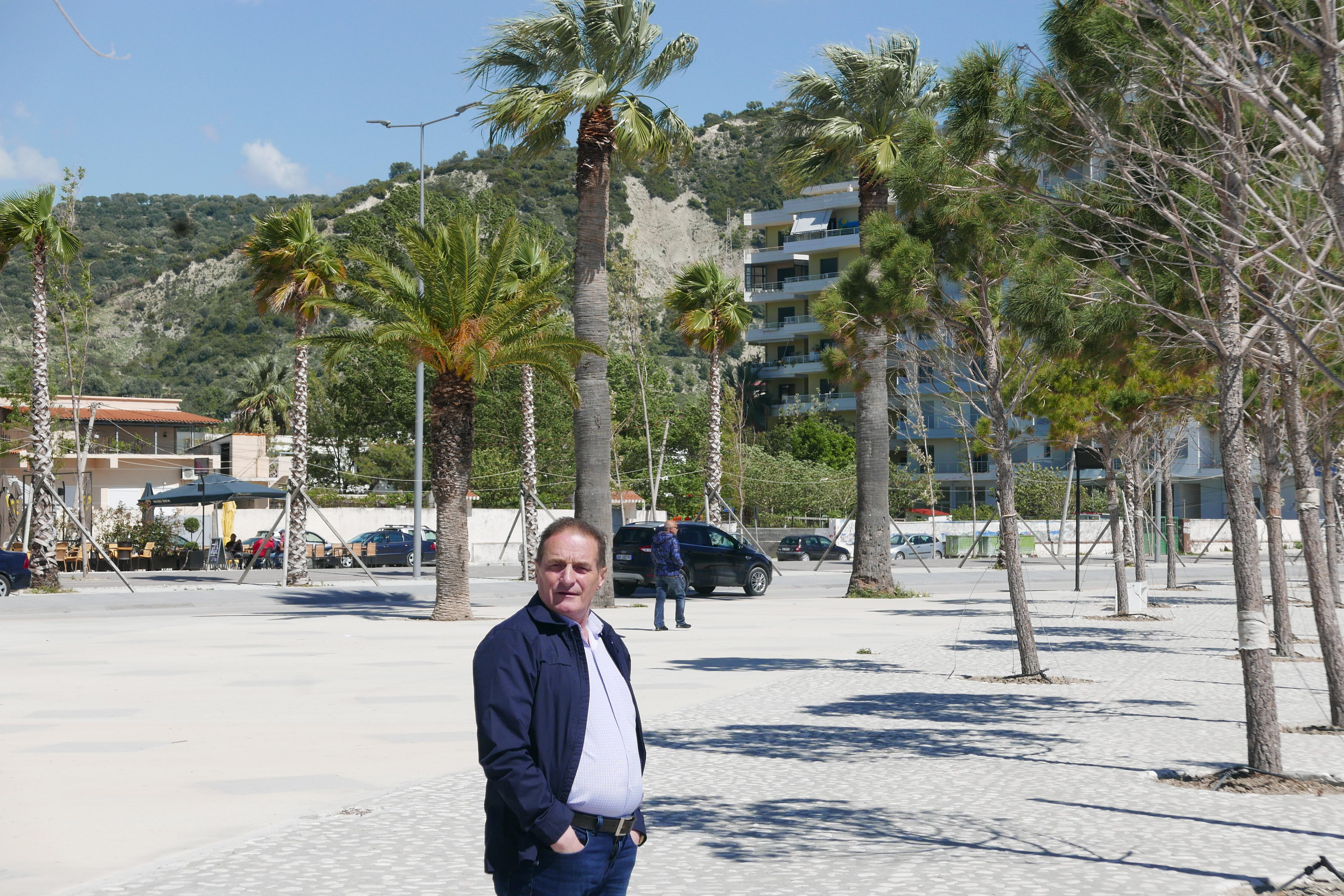
- Born: December 3, 1959; Dacići, FR Yugoslavia
- Writing career
- Language: Albanian

Ali Daci is a Montenegrin writer and politician of Albanian origin.

== Biography ==
Daci received his education in Serbian-Albanian language schools, and after completing his service in the Yugoslav military, he studied Albanian studies in Kosovo. In 1989, he became an Albanian language teacher. He became involved in political activity within the Democratic League in Montenegro, serving as the chairman of its branch in Rožaje.

Daci maintained close ties with Albanian political leaders, especially with the LDK and its leader Ibrahim Rugova. He helped to shelter thousands of Albanian refugees who fled during the Kosovo War. He is an activist of the Scientific Conference for the Albanian Right. He is a collaborator of the RZMZ-Redaksia in the Albanian language and after the war he was a correspondent for Radio Peja for two years in a row. He collaborated with newspapers and the press of the time, where he mostly wrote about the situation and position of Albanians in Montenegro and the Sandzak, as well as giving the first beginnings of the humanitarian-patriotic activity of Mulla Jakup Kombi, Aqif Blyta, Xhemail Konicani. "Shtigjet e përgjakura" is his first book and he has published it in co-authorship with Rrahman Jashari under the title " Zemër e madhe një Malësi" in 2006.

== Honours ==
Daci was awarded the Honorary Citizen of Peja in 2019.
