= Miomir Dašić =

Montenegrin historian (1930–2020)

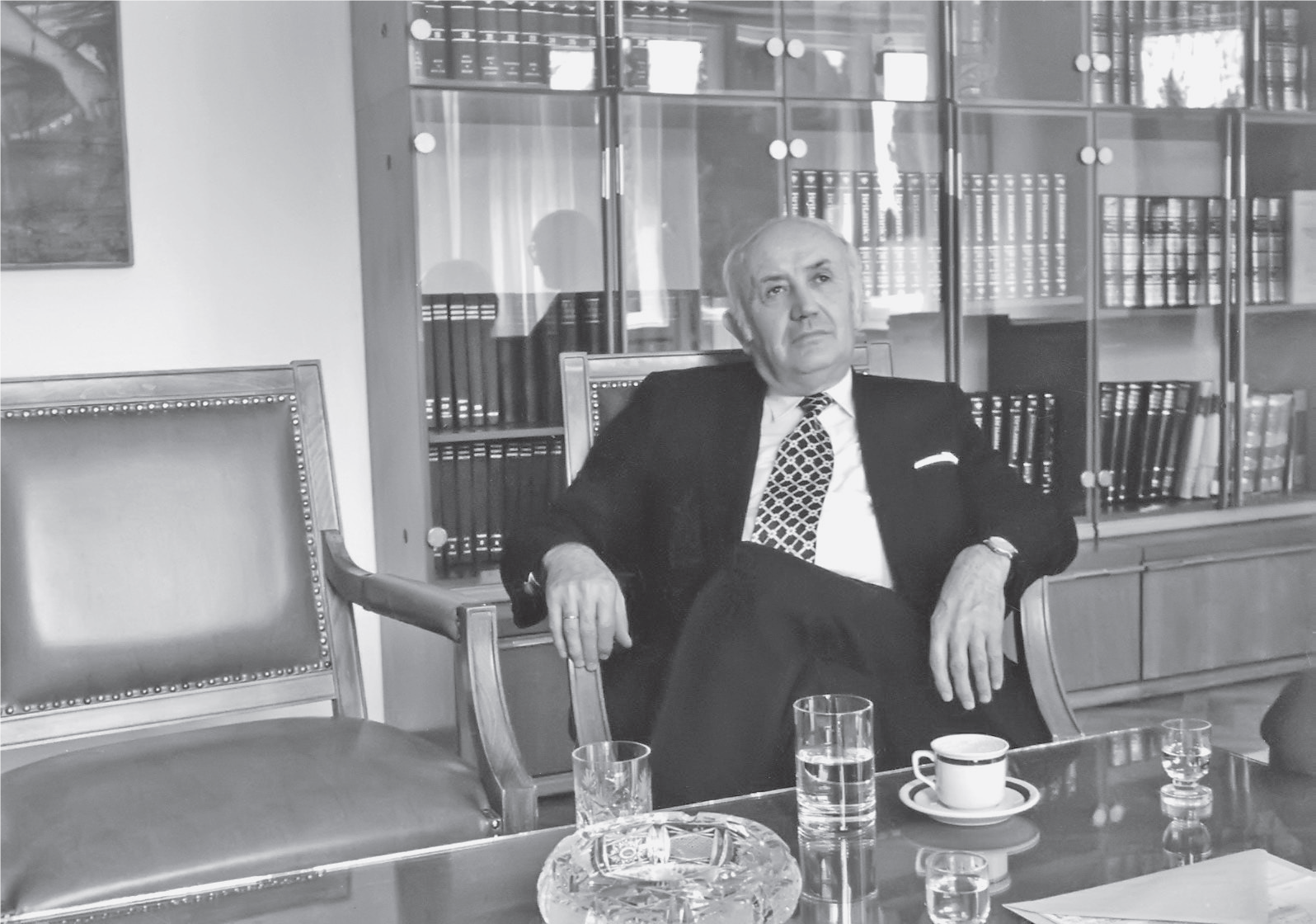
- Born: November 15, 1930; Rovca near Berane, Kingdom of Yugoslavia
- Died: October 28, 2020 (aged 89); Podgorica, Montenegro
- Occupation: historian

Miomir Dašić (Serbian Cyrillic: Миомир Дашић; 15 November 1930 – 28 October 2020) was a Montenegrin historian and a regular member of the Montenegrin Academy of Sciences and Arts.

== Biography ==
=== Life and education ===
Miomir Dašić was born in the small village of Rovca, near Berane in November 1930. He started elementary school in 1937 in Rovca, after which he attended Berane's gymnasium in 1941, before his studies were interrupted with the Nazi invasion of Yugoslavia and Second World War. He was awarded a baccalaureate in 1949 after finishing gymnasium education. In 1954, he graduated from the Faculty of Philosophy in Belgrade with a bachelor's degree in history. That same year, he started working as a professor in Berane's gymnasium until 1960. After six years of working as a professor, he applied for post-graduate studies, also at the Faculty of Philosophy in Belgrade. He obtained his master's degree in history in 1961. Later, he received a doctorate degree from the Faculty of Philosophy with a thesis on "Montenegro and liberation movement in Gornje Polimlje from the start of 19th century until the Congress of Berlin".

From October 1972, he worked as the head of the Culture and Science Sector at the Republic Institute for International Scientific, Cultural and Technical Cooperation of Montenegro in Podgorica and at the same time was a professor at the Pedagogical Academy in Nikšić. At the Faculty of Philosophy in Nikšić, he was elected as a part-time in 1981 and full-time professor in 1985.

The Montenegrin Academy of Sciences and Arts awarded Dašić with a high scientific recognition in 1991, and he became a regular member of the academy in 1997. Miomir Dašić had numerous study visits at universities across Europe: in Paris (1958, 1961, 1973, 1974, 1979), Utrecht (1982), Kraków (1978, 1981), among others.

He died on 28 October 2020.

== Bibliography ==
In six decades of his work Dašić published 12 books, around 270 case studies, arguments, articles and history essays, as well as 420 critical reviews and recessions.He also published more than 130 scientific and expert reports, while bibliography of his work has 830 units in it.

His works include:

- Oslobodilački pokret u Donjim Vasojevićima 1861. i 1862. i njegov ođek u Sandžaku (1982)
- Vasojevići od pomena do 1860. godine (1986)
- Uvod u istoriju sa osnovama pomoćnih istorijskih nauka (1988)
- Vasojevići u ustancima 1860‒1878.godine (1992)
- Karađorđevići iz Vasojevića (1996)
- Ogledi iz istorije Crne Gore (Studije o događajima od XVIII vijeka do 1918) (2000)
- Nezaobilazno u istoriografiji Crne Gore (prilozi nauci) (2003)
- Šekular i Šekularci od pomena do 1941 (2006)
- Biobibliografija akademika Miomira Dašića (2006)
- Rovca kod Berana (2008)
- O istoričarima CANU (2011)
- Sporenja u istoriografiji. O vrlinama i manama „Učiteljice života“(Podgorica – Bijelo Polje, 2014)
