= Berane Gymnasium =

Coordinates: 42°50′54.2″N 19°52′16.2″E

JU Gimnazija Panto Mališić ЈУ Гимназија Панто Малишић
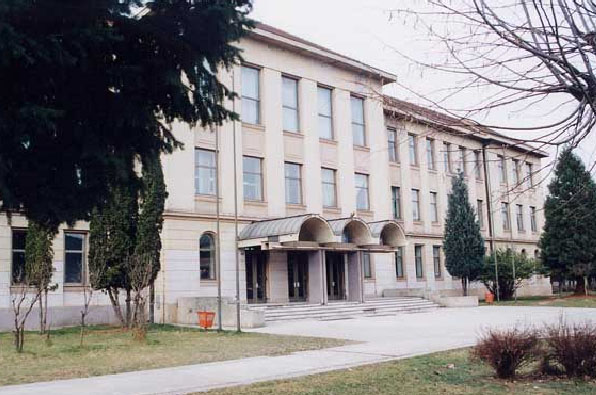
- The main entrance of the school
- Svetog Save 25; Berane; Montenegro

Information
- Type: Public
- Founded: November 6, 1913
- Director: Dejan Golubović
- Teaching staff: 35
- Enrollment: 615
- Average class size: 25-30
- Language: Serbo-Croatian
- Website: www.beranskagimnazija.me

Berane Gymnasium (Serbo-Croatian: Beranska gimnazija, Cyrillic: Беранска гимназија), officially Panto Mališić Gymnasium (Serbo-Croatian: JU Gimnazija "Panto Mališić", Cyrillic: ЈУ Гимназија "Панто Малишић") is a high school in Montenegro. Situated near the center of Berane, it was founded on November 6, 1913 by the government of Kingdom of Montenegro being the oldest high school in the Polimlje area. In 2023, the school will celebrate 110 years since its official foundation. It is one of the schools in Montenegro to offer German language Kultusministerkonferenz certified examinations, which allows examinees to continue their academic studies in Germany.

== Notable alumni ==
- Mihailo Lalić, novelist
- Radovan Zogović, poet
- Miodrag Bulatović, novelist and playwright
- Milovan Đilas, politician, novelist and theorist
- Slobodan Tomović, philosopher
- Zuvdija Hodžić, novelist and painter
- Čedo Vuković, novelist
- Ljubiša Stanković, scientist
- Branka Bogavac, journalist
- Miomir Dašić, historian
- Momčilo Zečević, historian
- Šerbo Rastoder, historian
- Gojko Kastratović, film director
