= Johovica =

Johovica Јоховица
- Village
- Location within Montenegro
- Country: Montenegro
- Municipality: Petnjica

Population (2011)
  - Total: 160
- Time zone: UTC+1 (CET)
  - Summer (DST): UTC+2 (CEST)

Johovica (Serbian Cyrillic: Јоховица) is a small village in the municipality of Petnjica, Montenegro.

== Demographics ==
According to the 2011 census, its population was 160.

Ethnicity in 2011
Ethnicity	Number	Percentage
Bosniaks	147	91.9%
other/undeclared	13	8.1%
Total	160	100%
