= Pahulj =

Paljuh Паљух
- Village
- Location within Montenegro
- Coordinates: 42.911234°N 19.933062°E
- Country: Montenegro
- Municipality: Petnjica

Population (2011)
  - Total: 110
- Time zone: UTC+1 (CET)
  - Summer (DST): UTC+2 (CEST)

Pahulj (Serbian Cyrillic: Пахуљ) is a small village in the municipality of Petnjica, Montenegro.

== Demographics ==
According to the 2011 census, its population was 110.

Ethnicity in 2011
Ethnicity	Number	Percentage
Bosniaks	57	51.8%
other/undeclared	53	48.2%
Total	110	100%
