= Lagatori =

Lagatore Лагатори
- Village
- Location within Montenegro
- Coordinates: 42.913745°N 19.98839°E
- Country: Montenegro
- Municipality: Petnjica

Population (2023)
  - Total: 490
- Time zone: UTC+1 (CET)
  - Summer (DST): UTC+2 (CEST)

Lagatore (Serbian Cyrillic: Лагатори) is a small village located in the municipality of Petnjica, Montenegro.

== Demographics ==
According to the 2011 census, its population was 482.

Ethnicity in 2011
Ethnicity	Number	Percentage
Bosniaks	404	83.8%
Montenegrins	12	2.5%
other/undeclared	66	13.7%
Total	482	100%
