= Gornja Vrbica =

Gornja Vrbica Горња Врбица
- Village
- Location within Montenegro
- Coordinates: 42.878441°N 20.003461°E
- Country: Montenegro
- Municipality: Petnjica

Population (2011)
  - Total: 801
- Time zone: UTC+1 (CET)
  - Summer (DST): UTC+2 (CEST)

Gornja Vrbica (Serbian Cyrillic: Горња Врбица) is a village in the municipality of Petnjica, Montenegro.

== Demographics ==
According to the 2011 census, its population was 801.

Ethnicity in 2011
Ethnicity	Number	Percentage
Bosniaks	746	93.1%
Montenegrins	6	0.7%
other/undeclared	49	6.1%
Total	801	100%
