= Dobrodole =

Dobrodole Добродоле
- Village
- Location within Montenegro
- Coordinates: 42.959516°N 19.993379°E
- Country: Montenegro
- Municipality: Petnjica

Population (2011)
  - Total: 101
- Time zone: UTC+1 (CET)
  - Summer (DST): UTC+2 (CEST)

Dobrodole (Serbian Cyrillic: Добродоле) is a small village in the municipality of Petnjica, Montenegro.

== Demographics ==
According to the 2011 census, its population was 101.

Ethnicity in 2011
Ethnicity	Number	Percentage
Bosniaks	99	98.0%
other/undeclared	2	2.0%
Total	101	100%
