= Bor, Petnjica =

Bor Бор
- Village
- Location within Montenegro
- Coordinates: 42.945868°N 20.018871°E
- Country: Montenegro
- Municipality: Petnjica

Population (2011)
  - Total: 222
- Time zone: UTC+1 (CET)
  - Summer (DST): UTC+2 (CEST)

Bor (Serbian Cyrillic: Бор) is a small village in the municipality of Petnjica, Montenegro.

== Demographics ==
According to the 2011 census, its population was 222.

Ethnicity in 2011
Ethnicity	Number	Percentage
Bosniaks	212	95.5%
other/undeclared	10	4.5%
Total	222	100%
