= Tucanje =

Tucanje Туцање
- Village
- Location within Montenegro
- Coordinates: 42.931086°N 19.931600°E
- Country: Montenegro
- Municipality: Petnjica

Population (2011)
  - Total: 289
- Time zone: UTC+1 (CET)
  - Summer (DST): UTC+2 (CEST)

Tucanje (Serbian Cyrillic: Туцање) is a village in the municipality of Petnjica, Montenegro. The village has been subject to widespread ridicule (mostly over the internet) in recent years, due to the word "Tucanje" carrying an alternative meaning in Serbo-Croatian, as the Nominative case of a verb denoting sexual intercourse.

== Demographics ==
According to the 2011 census, its population was 289.

Ethnicity in 2011
Ethnicity	Number	Percentage
Bosniaks	209	72.3%
other/undeclared	80	27.7%
Total	289	100%
