= Savin Bor =

Savin Bor Савин Бор
- Village
- Location within Montenegro
- Coordinates: 42.949817°N 20.044122°E
- Country: Montenegro
- Municipality: Petnjica

Population (2011)
  - Total: 255
- Time zone: UTC+1 (CET)
  - Summer (DST): UTC+2 (CEST)

Savin Bor (Serbian Cyrillic: Савин Бор) is a small village in the municipality of Petnjica, Montenegro.

== Demographics ==
According to the 2011 census, its population was 255.

Ethnicity in 2011
Ethnicity	Number	Percentage
Bosniaks	216	84.7%
other/undeclared	39	15.3%
Total	255	100%
