= Godočelje =

Godočelje Годоцеље
- Village
- Location within Montenegro
- Coordinates: 42.915905°N 19.940147°E
- Country: Montenegro
- Municipality: Petnjica

Population (2011)
  - Total: 225
- Time zone: UTC+1 (CET)
  - Summer (DST): UTC+2 (CEST)

Godočelje (Serbian Cyrillic: Годоцеље) is a village in the municipality of Petnjica, Montenegro.

== Demographics ==
According to the 2011 census, its population was 225.

Ethnicity in 2011
Ethnicity	Number	Percentage
Bosniaks	189	84.0%
other/undeclared	36	16.0%
Total	225	100%
