= Zoran Bojović =

Yugoslav footballer

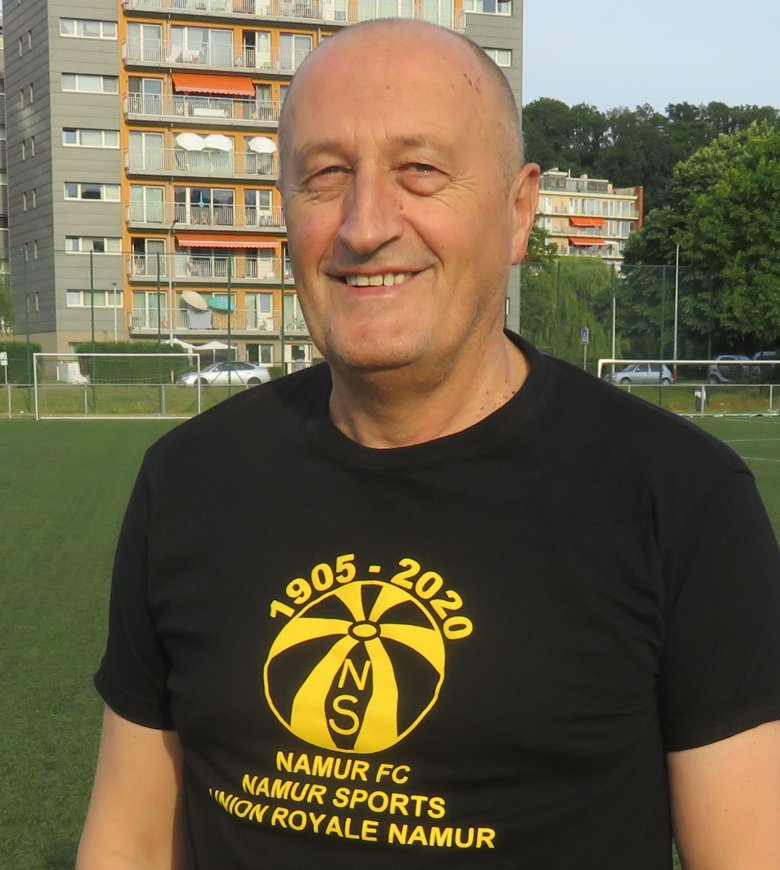

Personal information
- Full name: Zoran Bojović
- Date of birth: 26 November 1956 (age 69)
- Place of birth: Ivangrad, FPR Yugoslavia
- Height: 1.80 m (5 ft 11 in)
- Position: Midfielder

Team information
- Current team: UR Namur (manager)

Youth career
- Radnički Ivangrad

Senior career*
Years	Team	Apps	(Gls)
- Mogren
1979-1980	FAP		
1980–1985	Radnički Niš	132	(6)
1985–1987	Cercle Brugge	59	(8)
1987–1988	Standard Liège	25	(5)
1988–1989	Mulhouse	22	(1)
1989	St. Louis Storm	5	(0)
1991-1993	RFC Namur	31	(1)
1993-1994	Ciney		
Total		274	(19)

International career
1983	Yugoslavia	2	(0)

Managerial career
- 2012-2013: UR Namur
- 2013-2014: ES Jamboise
- 2018-: UR Namur
- * Club domestic league appearances and goals

Zoran Bojović (Cyrillic: Зоран Бојовић; born 26 November 1956) is a Yugoslav retired professional footballer who played as a midfielder. He also holds Belgian citizenship.

== Playing career ==
=== International ===
Bojović made his debut for Yugoslavia in an October 1983 European Championship qualification match against Norway and earned a total of 2 caps, scoring no goals. His second and final international was a friendly match, two weeks after his debut, against Switzerland.

== Managerial career ==
He extended his contract as manager of Belgian lower league side UR Namur in March 2020.

== Personal life ==
His son Petar (born in 1984) was also a professional footballer, mainly in Belgium with a short period in China
