= Donja Vrbica =

Donja Vrbica Доња Врбица
- Village
- Location within Montenegro
- Coordinates: 42.886496°N 19.985065°E
- Country: Montenegro
- Municipality: Petnjica

Population (2011)
  - Total: 114
- Time zone: UTC+1 (CET)
  - Summer (DST): UTC+2 (CEST)

Donja Vrbica (Serbian Cyrillic: Доња Врбица) is a small village in the municipality of Petnjica, Montenegro.

== Demographics ==
According to the 2011 census, its population was 114.

Ethnicity in 2011
Ethnicity	Number	Percentage
Bosniaks	87	76.3%
Montenegrins	9	7.9%
other/undeclared	18	15.8%
Total	114	100%
