= List of former municipalities of Montenegro =

This is a list of former municipalities of Montenegro, i.e. municipalities that no longer exist.

== Former Municipalities ==
Former	Fate	Result	Year
Andrijevica	Incorporated into Ivangrad (Berane); Divided into separate municipality with 24 settlements in 1991	Andrijevica	1955(?) - 1991
Golubovci	Incorporated into Titograd (Podgorica); Became Urban Municipality of Podgorica in 2006	Podgorica	1957
Gradac	Incorporated into Pljevlja	Pljevlja	
Grahovo	Incorporated into Nikšić	Nikšić	1960
Gusinje	Incorporated into Plav	Plav	1954
Krstac	Incorporated into Budva	Budva	1957
Lijeva Rijeka	Incorporated into Titograd (Podgorica)	Podgorica	1957
Lozna	Incorporated into Bijelo Polje	Bijelo Polje	1957
Manastir Morača	Incorporated into Kolašin	Kolašin	
Maoče	Incorporated into Pljevlja	Pljevlja	1957
Ostros	Incorporated into Bar	Bar	1957
Rijeka Crnojevića	Incorporated into Cetinje	Cetinje	
Petnjica	Incorporated into Ivangrad (Berane)	Berane	1957
Velimlje	Incorporated into Nikšić	Nikšić	
Virpazar	Incorporated into Bar	Bar	1957
Tomaševo	Incorporated into Bijelo Polje	Bijelo Polje	
Tuzi	Incorporated into Titograd (Podgorica); Became Urban Municipality of Podgorica in 2006	Podgorica	1957
