= Trpezi =

Trpezi Трпези
- Village
- Location within Montenegro
- Coordinates: 42.898404°N 20.002463°E
- Country: Montenegro
- Municipality: Petnjica

Population (2011)
  - Total: 763
- Time zone: UTC+1 (CET)
  - Summer (DST): UTC+2 (CEST)

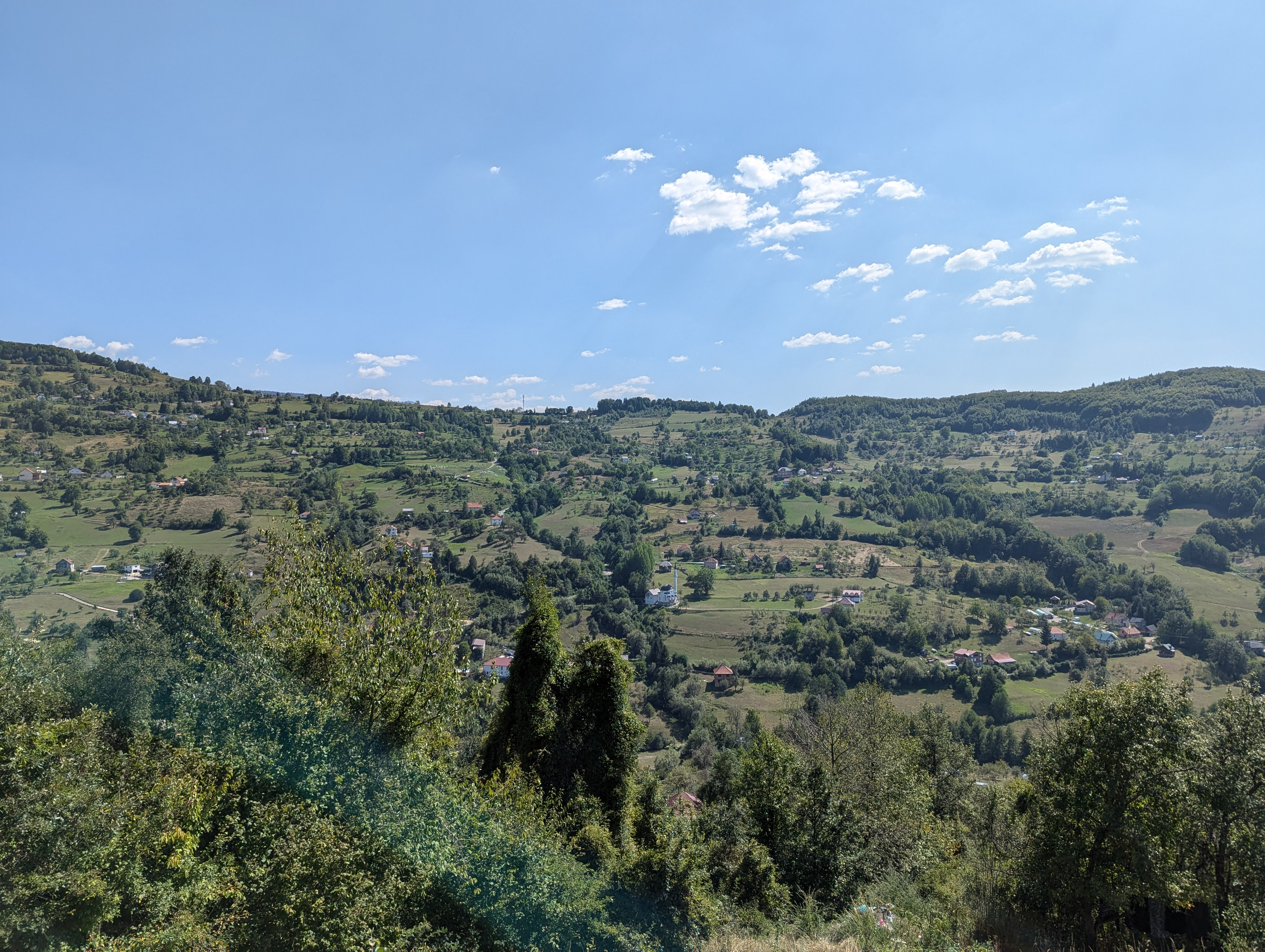
View of Trpezi

Trpezi (Serbian Cyrillic: Трпези) is a village in the municipality of Petnjica, Montenegro.

== Demographics ==
According to the 2011 census, its population was 763.

Ethnicity in 2011
Ethnicity	Number	Percentage
Bosniaks	645	84.5%
other/undeclared	118	15.5%
Total	763	100%
