= Ivan Đurković =

Montenegrin handball player (born 1986)

Personal information
- Full name: Ivan Đurković
- Nationality: Montenegrin
- Born: 20 February 1986 (age 40) Ivangrad, SFR Yugoslavia
- Height: 1.98 m (6 ft 6 in)

Sport
- Sport: Handball
- Position: Left back

Youth career
- Years: Team
- –: Berane

Senior clubs
- Years: Team
- 2005–2007: Partizan
- 2008: Varteks
- 2009: Berane
- 2009: Metković
- 2010–2011: Budvanska rivijera
- 2011–2012: Bjelovar

Ivan Đurković (Serbian Cyrillic: Иван Ђурковић; born 20 February 1986) is a Montenegrin handball player.

== Career ==
Đurković spent two and a half seasons at Partizan, before moving to Croatia and signing with Varteks in January 2008. He would play for fellow Croatian club Metković in the 2011–12 season.

== Honours ==
Partizan

- Serbian Handball Cup: 2006–07
