= R-6 regional road (Montenegro) =

Road in Montenegro

R-6 regional road
- Regionalni put R-6

Route information
- Length: 29 km (18 mi)

Major junctions
- South end: M-5 in Most Zeleni
- North end: 205 in Vuča

Location
- Country: Montenegro
- Municipalities: Rožaje

Highway system
- Transport in Montenegro; Motorways
| ← R-5 | → R-7 |

R-6 regional road (Montenegrin: Regionalni put R-6) is a Montenegrin roadway.

It serves as a connection between Rožaje and Tutin, Serbia.

== History ==
In January 2016, the Ministry of Transport and Maritime Affairs published a bylaw on categorisation of state roads. Local road on this route was recategorised as R-6 regional road.

== Major intersections ==
| Municipality | Location | km | mi | Destinations | Notes |
|---|---|---|---|---|---|
| Rožaje | Zeleni most | 0.0 | 0.0 | M-5 – Berane, Novi Pazar (Serbia) | |
| Rožaje | Vuča | 29 | 18 | 205 – Tutin (Serbia) | Border crossing with Serbia |
1.000 mi = 1.609 km; 1.000 km = 0.621 mi
