= Kalica =

Kalica Калица
- Village
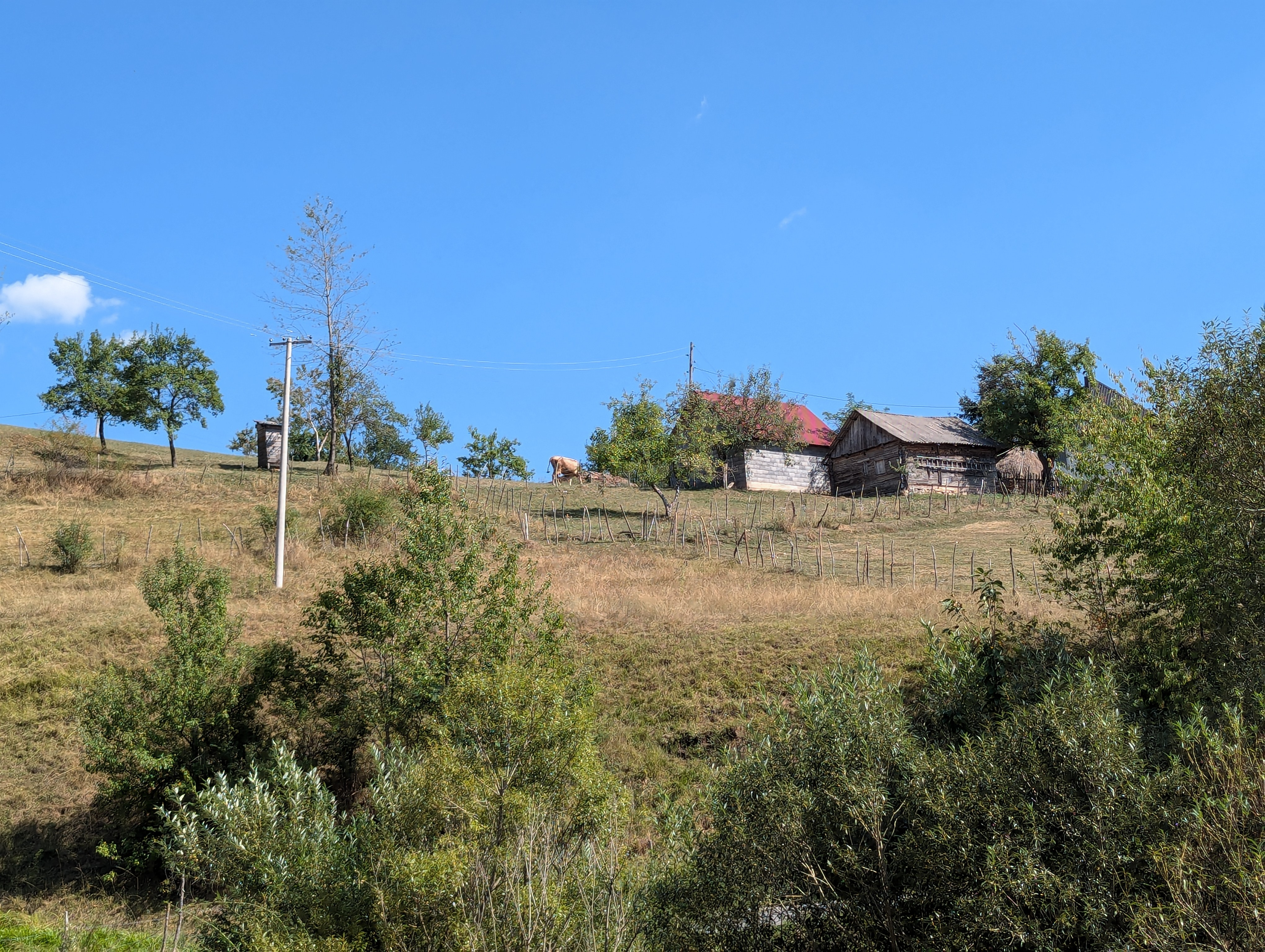
- Image of a hill in Kalica, Petnjica Municipality

- Location within Montenegro
- Coordinates: 42.888271°N 20.037247°E
- Country: Montenegro
- Municipality: Petnjica

Population (2011)
  - Total: 128
- Time zone: UTC+1 (CET)
  - Summer (DST): UTC+2 (CEST)

Kalica (Serbian Cyrillic: Калица) is a small village in the municipality of Petnjica, Montenegro.

== Demographics ==
According to the 2011 census, its population was 128.

Ethnicity in 2011
Ethnicity	Number	Percentage
Bosniaks	124	96.6%
other/undeclared	4	3.1%
Total	128	100%
