= Dašča Rijeka =

Dašča Rijeka Дашча Ријека
- Village
- Location within Montenegro
- Coordinates: 42.944698°N 20.078905°E
- Country: Montenegro
- Municipality: Petnjica

Population (2011)
  - Total: 103
- Time zone: UTC+1 (CET)
  - Summer (DST): UTC+2 (CEST)

Dašča Rijeka (Serbian Cyrillic: Дашча Ријека) is a village in the municipality of Petnjica, Montenegro.

== Demographics ==
According to the 2011 census, its population was 103.

Ethnicity in 2011
Ethnicity	Number	Percentage
Bosniaks	96	93.2%
other/undeclared	7	6.8%
Total	103	100%
