= Orahovo, Petnjica =

Orahovo Орахово
- Village
- Location within Montenegro
- Coordinates: 42.941314°N 19.915634°E
- Country: Montenegro
- Municipality: Petnjica

Population (2011)
  - Total: 109
- Time zone: UTC+1 (CET)
  - Summer (DST): UTC+2 (CEST)

Orahovo (Serbian Cyrillic: Орахово) is a small village in the municipality of Petnjica, Montenegro.

== Demographics ==
According to the 2011 census, its population was 109.

Ethnicity in 2011
Ethnicity	Number	Percentage
Bosniaks	88	80.7%
other/undeclared	21	19.3%
Total	109	100%
