= Vrševo =

Vrševo Вршево
- Village
- Location within Montenegro
- Coordinates: 42.944395°N 19.959653°E
- Country: Montenegro
- Municipality: Petnjica

Population (2011)
  - Total: 226
- Time zone: UTC+1 (CET)
  - Summer (DST): UTC+2 (CEST)

Vrševo (Serbian Cyrillic: Вршево) is a small village in the municipality of Petnjica, Montenegro.

== Demographics ==
According to the 2011 census, its population was 226.

Ethnicity in 2011
Ethnicity	Number	Percentage
Bosniaks	205	90.7%
other/undeclared	21	9.3%
Total	226	100%
