= List of cities in Montenegro =

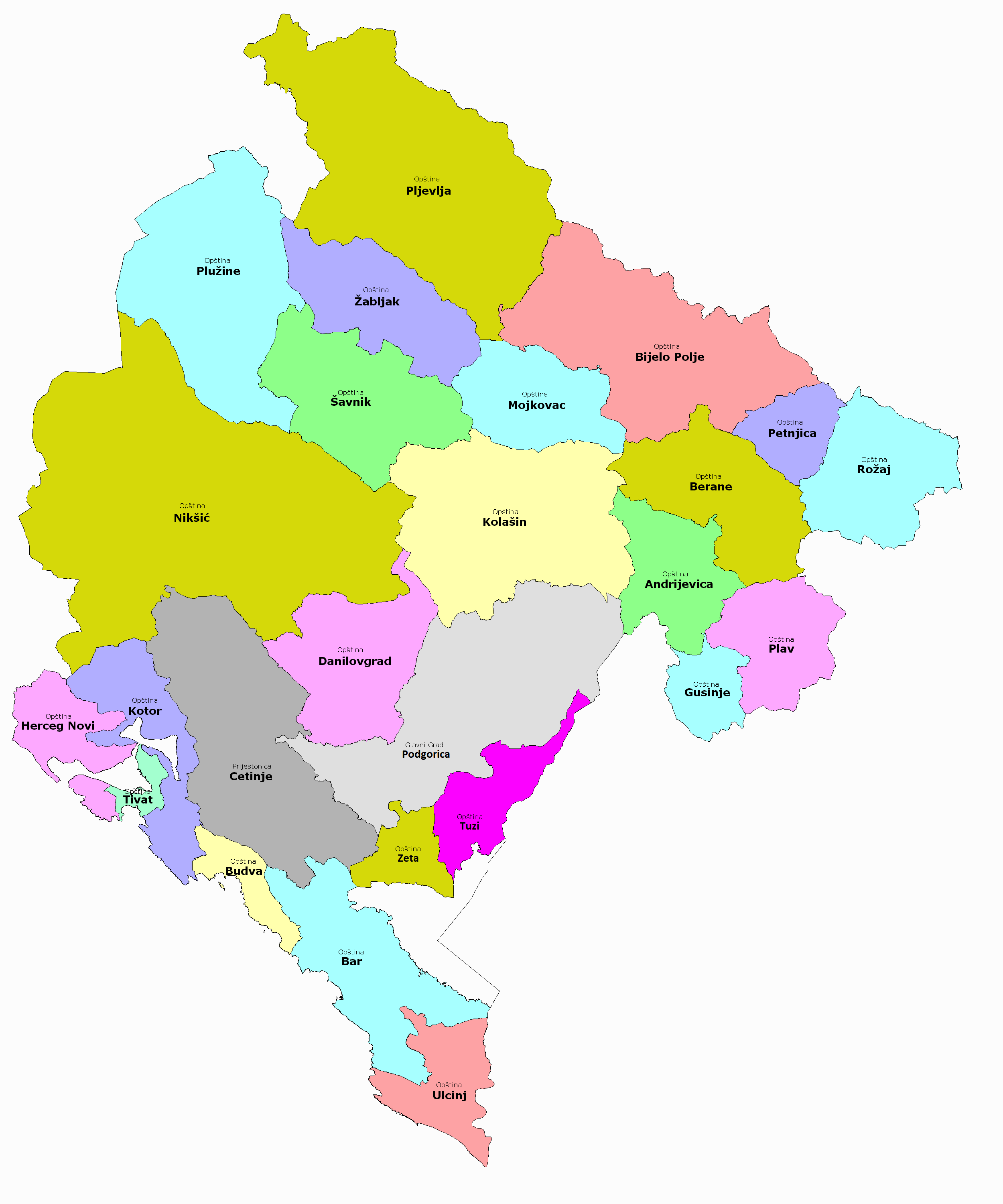
Map of Montenegro with municipalities and cities

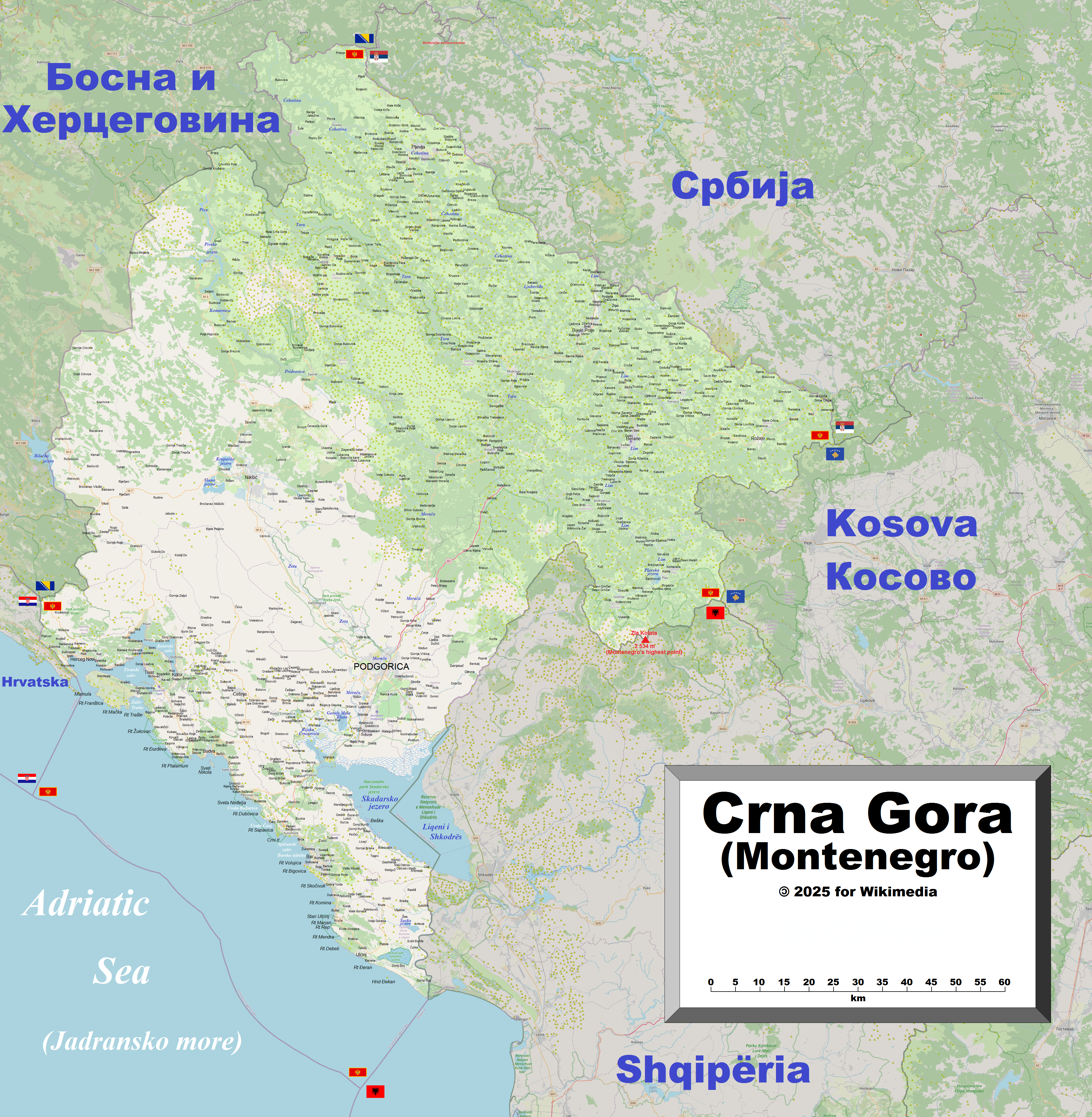
Map of Montenegro with cities and many smaller places

The following table presents a list of Montenegrin settlements (Montenegrin: Naselje), with the settlements' populations from the 2023 Montenegrin Census done by the Montenegro Statistical Office.

== List ==
This is a list of settlements in Montenegro:

Rank	City / Town	2023 pop.	Region	Municipality
1	Podgorica	179,505	Central	Podgorica Capital City
2	Nikšić	65,705	Central	Nikšić
3	Bar	45,812	Coastal	Bar
4	Bijelo Polje	38,662	Northern	Bijelo Polje
5	Herceg Novi	30,824	Coastal	Herceg Novi
6	Budva	27,401	Coastal	Budva
7	Berane	24,645	Northern	Berane
8	Pljevlja	24,134	Northern	Pljevlja
9	Rožaje	23,184	Northern	Rožaje
10	Kotor	22,746	Coastal	Kotor
11	Danilovgrad	18,617	Central	Danilovgrad
12	Tivat	16,338	Coastal	Tivat
13	Cetinje	14,494	Central	Old Royal Capital Cetinje
14	Tuzi	12,979	Central	Tuzi
15	Ulcinj	11,215	Coastal	Ulcinj
16	Plav	9,060	Northern	Plav
17	Mojkovac	6,728	Northern	Mojkovac
18	Kolašin	6,700	Northern	Kolašin
19	Petnjica	4,957	Northern	Petnjica
20	Andrijevica	3,971	Northern	Andrijevica
21	Gusinje	3,933	Northern	Gusinje
22	Žabljak	2,941	Northern	Žabljak
23	Golubovci	2,521	Central	Zeta
24	Plužine	2,177	Northern	Plužine
25	Šavnik	1,569	Northern	Šavnik

== See also ==
- Municipalities of Montenegro
- Statistical regions of Montenegro
- Populated places of Montenegro
- Subdivisions of Montenegro
- NUTS statistical regions of Montenegro
