= Metaljka =

- Village
- Location within Montenegro
- Country: Montenegro
- Municipality: Pljevlja

Population (2011)
  - Total: 35
- Time zone: UTC+1 (CET)
  - Summer (DST): UTC+2 (CEST)

Metaljka (Montenegrin: Метаљка) is a small village in the municipality of Pljevlja, Montenegro. It is located at the Bosnian border.

== Demographics ==
According to the 2003 census, the village had a population of 34 people.

According to the 2011 census, its population was 35.

Ethnicity in 2011
Ethnicity	Number	Percentage
Serbs	30	85.7%
other/undeclared	5	14.3%
Total	35	100%
