= NUTS statistical regions of Montenegro =

Statistical regions of Montenegro

As a candidate country of the European Union, Montenegro (ME) is included in the Nomenclature of Territorial Units for Statistics (NUTS). The three NUTS levels are:

- NUTS-1: ME0 Montenegro
- NUTS-2: ME00 Montenegro
- NUTS-3: ME000 Montenegro

Below the NUTS levels, there are two LAU levels (LAU-1: municipalities; LAU-2: settlements).

== See also ==
- Subdivisions of Montenegro
- ISO 3166-2 codes of Montenegro

== Sources ==
- Hierarchical list of the Nomenclature of territorial units for statistics - NUTS and the Statistical regions of Europe
