= Berane Airport =

Berane Airport Dolac Airport
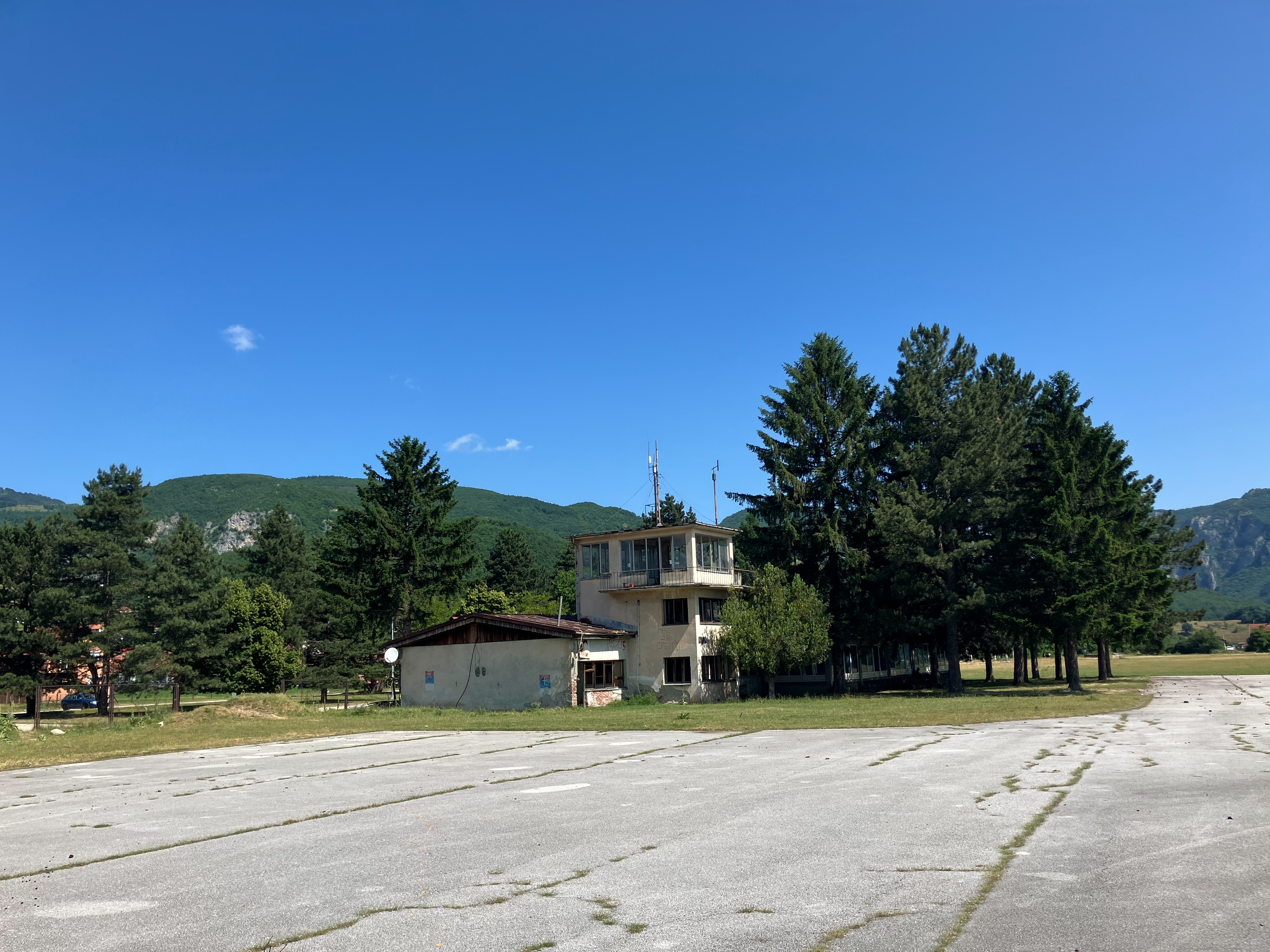
- IATA: IVG; ICAO: LYBR

Summary
- Airport type: Public
- Operator: N/A
- Location: Berane, Montenegro
- Elevation AMSL: 2,287 ft (697 m)
- Coordinates: 42°50′20.50″N 19°51′43.30″E
- Interactive map of Berane Airport

Runways
Direction	Length		Surface
Direction	ft	m	Surface
01L/19R	4,921	1,500	Grass
01/19	6,234	1,900	Concrete/Asphalt
01R/19L	4,921	1,500	Grass

Berane Airport (Montenegrin: Aerodrom Berane / Аеродром Беране), also known as Dolac Airport (Montenegrin: Aerodrom Dolac / Аеродром Долац) (IATA: IVG, ICAO: LYBR), is an airport located near Berane, Montenegro. Berane was known as Ivangrad from July 1949 to March 1992, hence the IATA code IVG.

It is one of the four Montenegrin airports to feature a paved runway and one of three Montenegrin airports to have a terminal building. Berane Airport was used for regular airline traffic during the SFRY era, but has since fallen into disuse. Today it is used mostly by general aviation. There is an ongoing debate on whether Berane Airport should be invested in and possibly revitalized as an international airport. Berane city officials, as well as the general public in north-eastern Montenegro, favours the reconstruction, while government authorities question the project's viability.

== History ==
On July 21, 1961, the Belgrade-Ivangrad tourist line to the nearby Bjelasica mountain was opened by JAT Yugoslav Airlines with a Douglas DC-3 airliner and flights in this type of aircraft with brief interruptions have been undertaken up to 1971. In the period from 1973 to 1974, the JNA carried out a full reconstruction and construction of asphalt-concrete runway. The airport is officially included in the regular transport on May 6, 1975, when he was re-opened line to Belgrade on the Fokker F227B aircraft of Zagreb-based Croatiaairline Pan Adria]. It was a great experience for all and in a way a symbol of prestige in these areas. However, at the end of 1976 Pan Adria declared bankruptcy, and thus the traffic from this airport fell dramatically. An attempt during the early 1980s to establish lines with Slovenian Inex-Adria Airways ended in a failure; air carrier terms were too binding for the city economy, and management did not support the initiative. Several promotional flights were made with the Dash 7, serving as the airport's last attempt for regular traffic. The airport now serves general aviation, Aeroclub Ivangrad maintaining a hub. The Vojna Vazduhoplovna Gimnazija (Military Aeronautic Gymnasium) cadets from Mostar, Bosnia & Herzegovina historically served here.

=== History of passenger operations ===
Berane airport has a history of serving passenger flights to Belgrade, Zagreb, Ljubljana and Podgorica, but has since fallen into disuse.

The airport in Berane opened in 1935. It was heavily used during World War II. The first passenger plane landed in Berane on 21 July 1961. In 1974, the landing strip was reconstructed and enlarged to nearly 2000 meters. In 1975 Pan Adria opened regular passenger flights from Berane to Belgrade.

In 1980, Inex Adria Airways tries to reassume passenger flights. On 14 May 2006, a local politician claimed that within two years' time the passenger service at the airport will be restored. On 19 October 2007 an article appeared in the daily newspaper Republica. In the article it is said that from an economic viewpoint it is more important to invest in the airport in Tivat than in the airport in Berane. That was the conclusion of the report financed by the European agency EAR.

Mr Golubović writes on 23 August 2008 that the local municipality employed experts from Belgrade to write a study on the reactivation of the Berane airport. On 2 April 2009 a meeting was held at the ministry, to discuss the possibilities of reactivation of the Berane passenger airport. In December 2009 there was a discussion whether the Turkish businessmen should invest in reopening the Berane airport.

On 27 April 2010 it was announced by Berane municipal authorities, that the negotiations with investors from Germany and Turkey will start within one month. In 2011 a tendering procedure was announced to find investor willing to construct a new passenger terminal in Berane. The capacity of the passenger airport in the tendering documents was 120 passengers in the rush hours. A terminal of 3000 square meters was to be built by investors.

On 13 March 2011 it was announced by Berane authorities that the airport in Berane should open for airlines in 2011 or 2012.

Two companies ”Limak„ and ”Turk-mol„ expressed interest in the investment. However, in May 2011 it became clear that the Turkish company was interested in Berane airport reactivation only if they were allowed to manage 2 other passenger airports in Montenegro (Tivat and Podgorica airports).

On 22 July 2011 the president of Montenegro claims that we should soon expect the reactivation of the Berane airport.

On 16 May 2013 an article appeared, claiming that the Turkish investor deemed the Berane airport as not profitable for business.

In 2014, a performance called „Čekajući avion iz Njujorka koji neće stići“ takes place at the disused passenger airport in Berane. In the picture that appeared in the local newspaper, we may see local people with passports, "tickets" and suitcases "waiting" for an alleged plane at the Berane airport.

== Current state ==
According to AIP Serbia / Montenegro, the airport does not have any fuel facilities, so it is not useful for any non-scheduled traffic. There is no hangar space for visiting aircraft, as the hangar is in bad condition. There are no lights at the landing strip or aprons. There is no fence around the airport. There are no navigational aids. The passenger terminal is in a state of disrepair. Locals regularly gather on the runway with foot traffic and vehicular traffic common throughout the day. The runway is a popular location for drag races and numerous accidents have occurred which has resulted in fatalities.

The runway is made of asphalt and has dimensions 1899 × 45 meters. It needs to be enlarged to 2100 meters at least if the airport would be used by low-cost airlines in the future. From the aerial pictures it seems that such an enlargement is possible.

== Future development ==
=== Existing chances ===
There are plans to reopen the airport for passenger traffic. However, the situation is unclear and little effort is made in that direction. Even the airport in Tivat operates with profits. Airport in Berane also could work, but it would take long years to reach a point of profitability. The runway length is 1900 meters. With problems, even Wizzair or Ryanair could operate here.

=== Runway extension plans ===
There are very few passenger airports in Montenegro. Opening another passenger airport would mean a great chance for the surrounding communities. It is one of the five Montenegrin airports to feature a paved runway. However, the runway requires an extension in order to attract low-cost flights. The proposed length should be 2500 meters; the current length is only 1900 meters.

=== Existing passenger terminal building modernisation ===
The airport is one of three Montenegrin airports to have terminal buildings; however, the terminal is unused. The terminal building is currently not used as a passenger terminal, and it would require a modernisation before reopening. The terminal could also be extended, if low-cost carriers would use the airport. Berane Airport was used for regular airline traffic during the SFRY era, with the lines to Belgrade, Zagreb, Ljubljana and Podgorica operating, but has since fallen into disuse. Today the airport is used mostly by general aviation. In the media there was a short debate whether Berane Airport should be invested in and possibly revitalized as an international airport. Berane city officials, as well as general public in north eastern Montenegro, favours the reconstruction, saying that such investment would create many new jobs. Some government authorities were questioning the future rentability of the airport.

=== Opinion of the Berane municipality ===
The local self-government in Berane considers the restart of the working of airport as very significant issue and puts it in its priorities. In cooperation with the Government of Montenegro, the Municipality of Berane would provide all necessary support to investors interested in the preparation of the Feasibility Study. The airport in Berane is an important strategic project for the north of Montenegro, especially bearing in mind that it is located within the most important resource, Bjelasica Mountain, where there is currently in realization the construction of the road Berane – Kolasin. Consequently, the local government is trying to attract the attention of potential investors interested in activating Berane airport. In an effort to objectively examine the situation and consider the possibility of reactivating the airport, the delegation of the Municipality of Berane, together with professors from the Faculty of Transport, Communications and Logistics from Berane, visited Tuzla (Bosnia and Herzegovina) in order to become acquainted with the model of functioning of its local airport. The realization of the important project of the Berane Airport reactivation would improve the overall economic picture of the Northeast, point new opportunities for investment activities and open new jobs, as well as valorization of the entire region of Bjelasica and Komovi. In the context of the call for NATO membership sent to Montenegro, the issue of re-activating Berane airport is being actualized. The airport in Berane is owned by the state of Montenegro. Therefore, the Municipality of Berane believes that in the Transport Development Strategy at the national level, in order to stimulate favorable economic environment, a more intense activity in the direction of activating Berane airport should be defined, with the aim of valorization of tourism potentials of Montenegro. Local self-government of Berane does not have the financial means nor the possibility of credit indebtedness in the direction of activating the airport, for the comparative experiences of surrounding countries show that this investment amounts to 10-12 million euro in order to bring the airport up to the level of functional usability. Beside the terminal building, during the sixties, on the lines Berane–Podgorica–Berane, Berane–Beograd–Berane and for Zagreb and Ljubljana, transport was carried out by planes DC3 and for short time by Fokkers. Airport was closed for public transport in 1975 when the army of the former Yugoslavia made high quality runway some two kilometers long and 45 meters wide.

=== Recent investments ===
On April 6, 2023, the Prime Minister of Montenegro, Dritan Abazovic, recently signed a memorandum between the Government of Montenegro, and the German company Elite-Private Jet Service. According to an earlier announcement, the investment in the restoration of the airport will total to around €75,000,000, divided between the investment in the airport itself costing around €45,000,000, and an investment of about €30,000,000 in the opening of factories.

In accordance with their intentions, they plan to develop the first innovative, self-sustaining airport of the future. As part of their proposal, work will also be done on nano solar technology, according to the current concept.
