= R-4 regional road (Montenegro) =

Road in Montenegro

R-4 regional road
- Regionalni put R-4

Route information
- Length: 10.5 km (6.5 mi)

Major junctions
- South end: R-3 in Dajevića Han
- North end: 192 in Čemerno

Location
- Country: Montenegro
- Municipalities: Pljevlja

Highway system
- Transport in Montenegro; Motorways
← R-3	→ R-5

R-4 regional road (Montenegrin: Regionalni put R-4) is a Montenegrin roadway.

It serves as extension to R-3 regional road and a connection between Pljevlja and Priboj, Serbia.

== History ==
In January 2016, the Ministry of Transport and Maritime Affairs published bylaw on categorisation of state roads. With new categorisation, new R-4 regional road on this route was established from previous municipal road.

== Major intersections ==
Municipality	Location	km	mi	Destinations	Notes
Pljevlja	Dajevića Han	0.0	0.0	R-3 – Pljevlja, Goražde (Bosnia and Herzegovina)	
Pljevlja	Čemerno	10.5	6.5	192 – Priboj (Serbia)	Border crossing with Serbia
1.000 mi = 1.609 km; 1.000 km = 0.621 mi
