= Dacići =

Dacići Дацићи Dacaj
- Village
- Location within Montenegro
- Country: Montenegro
- Municipality: Rožaje

Population (2011)
  - Total: 364
- Time zone: UTC+1 (CET)
  - Summer (DST): UTC+2 (CEST)

Dacići (Cyrillic: Дацићи; Albanian: Dacaj) is a village in the municipality of Rožaje, Montenegro.

== Demographics ==
According to the 2011 census, its population was 364, all but two of them Albanians.

== Notable people ==
- Ali Daci, Albanian writer and politician
