= Kalače =

Kalače Калаче
- Village
- Location within Montenegro
- Country: Montenegro
- Municipality: Rožaje

Population (2011)
  - Total: 948
- Time zone: UTC+1 (CET)
  - Summer (DST): UTC+2 (CEST)

Kalače (Serbian Cyrillic: Калаче) is a village in the municipality of Rožaje, Montenegro.

== Demographics ==
According to the 2011 census, its population was 948.

Ethnicity in 2011
Ethnicity	Number	Percentage
Bosniaks	897	94.6%
other/undeclared	51	5.4%
Total	948	100%
