= Budimlja =

Budimlja Будимља
- Town
- Location within Montenegro
- Country: Montenegro
- Municipality: Berane

Population (2023)
  - Total: 2,089
- Time zone: UTC+1 (CET)
  - Summer (DST): UTC+2 (CEST)

Budimlja (Montenegrin Cyrillic: Будимља) is a village in the municipality of Berane, Montenegro.

== History ==
In the Defter of 1582, for the first time in this area, Vlachs were mentioned as inhabitants. There were 3 houses in the settlement, 2 being Vlach houses. Vlachs were the rulers of this area and the people enjoyed being under their rule.

== Demographics ==
According to the 2023 census, its population was 2,089.

Ethnicity in 2011
Ethnicity	Number	Percentage
Serbs	1,018	51.1%
Montenegrins	516	25.9%
Egyptians	169	8.5%
Roma	68	3.4%
Bosniaks	23	1.2%
Albanians	9	0.5%
Croats	6	0.3%
other/undeclared	185	9.3%
Total	1,994	100%
