= Petnjica Municipality =

Municipality of Montenegro

Petnjica Municipality Opština Petnjica Општина Петњица
- Municipality
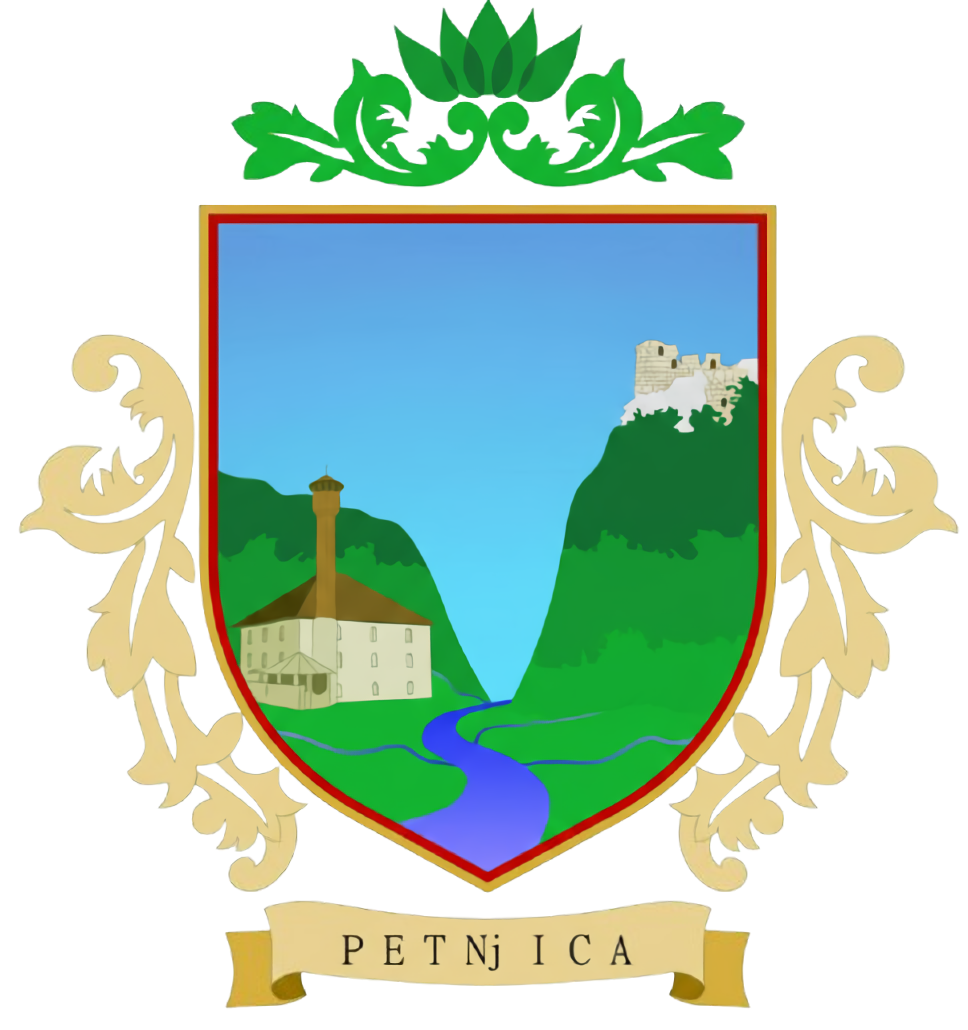
- Coat of arms

- Petnjica Municipality in Montenegro
- Country: Montenegro
- Seat: Petnjica

Government
  - Mayor: Erol Muratović (DPS)

Area
  - Total: 173 km^{2} (67 sq mi)

Population (2023)
  - Total: 4,957
  - Density: 28.7/km^{2} (74.2/sq mi)
- Time zone: UTC+1 (CET)
  - Summer (DST): UTC+2 (CEST)
- Postal code: 84312
- Area code: +382 51
- ISO 3166 code: ME-23
- Website: www.petnjica.co.me

Petnjica Municipality (Montenegrin: Opština Petnjica / Општина Петњица) is one of the municipalities of Montenegro. The municipality is located in northern Montenegro. The center is Petnjica. The Petnjica Municipality was created in 2013, when it was split from the Berane Municipality.

== Subdivisions ==
Petnjica Municipality is divided into 7 local communities (Montenegrin Latin: mjesne zajednice, singular: mjesna zajednica) with 25 settlements (naselja, singular: naselje). The local communities are: Bor (Bor and Ponor), Petnjica (Petnjica, Godočelje, Johovica, Lagatori, Lazi, Pahulj and Radmanci), Savin Bor (Savin Bor, Dašča Rijeka, Dobrodole and Kruščica), Javorova (Javorova, Murovac and Poroče), Trpezi (Trpezi and Kalica), Tucanje (Tucanje, Azane, Lješnica, Orahovo and Vrševo) and Vrbica (Upper Vrbica and Lower Vrbica).

== Local parliament ==
Party	Seats	Gov't.
Democratic Party of Socialists	16	Yes
Bosniak Party	6	Yes
Social Democrats	2	Yes
Social Democratic Party	1	No
Bosniak Democratic Union	3	No
Democratic Montenegro	2	No

== Demographics ==
The village of Petnjica is the administrative center of the Petnjica Municipality, which had a population of 4,957 in 2023. The village of Petnjica itself had a population of 518. The ethnic groups in the Petnjica Municipality, according to the 2023 census:

Bosniaks	83.96%
Muslims	9.30%
Montenegrins	4.74%
Serbs	0.95%
Others	1.6%

Eastern Orthodoxy	1.31%
Muslims	98.47%
Others	0.22%

Montenegrin	32.50%
Serbian	1.27%
Bosnian	62.09%
Serbo-Croatian	0.36%
Undeclared	0.24%
Others	3.54%
