= Subdivisions of Montenegro =

- Municipalities of Montenegro (LAU-1, ISO 3166-2:ME)
- Communes (Montenegrin: Mjesna zajednica)
- Settlements (Montenegrin: Naselje) (LAU-2)
- NUTS of Montenegro
- Regions of Montenegro

== History ==
Former: Districts of Montenegro (srez)

In 1910 the Kingdom of Montenegro was divided into 10 oblasts and 56 captaincies.

== See also ==
- Municipalities of Montenegro
- Cities and towns of Montenegro
- Regions of Montenegro
- Populated places of Montenegro
- ISO 3166-2:ME
- Administrative divisions of Yugoslavia
