= Berane =

Town and municipality in Northern Montenegro

Berane Беране
- Town and municipality
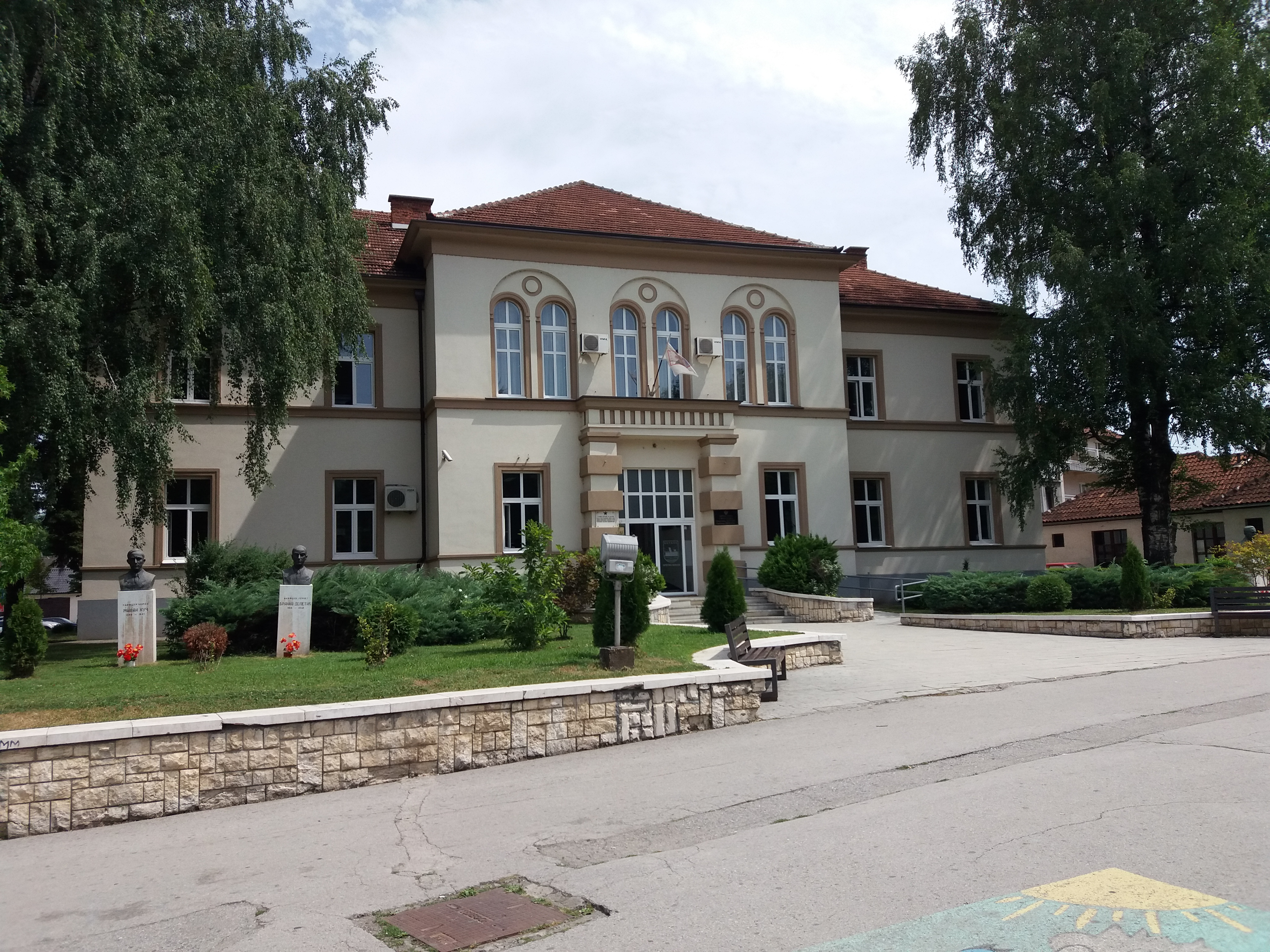
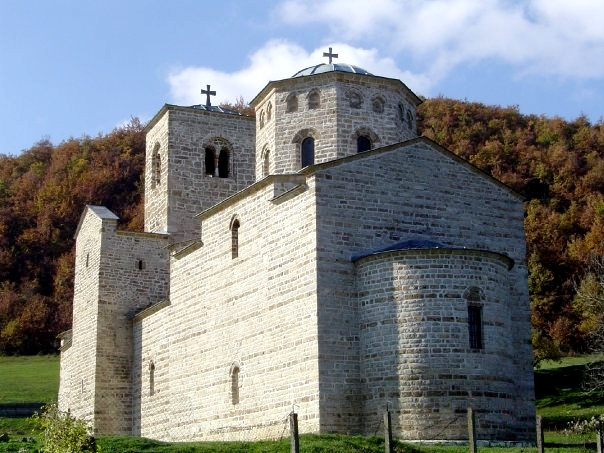
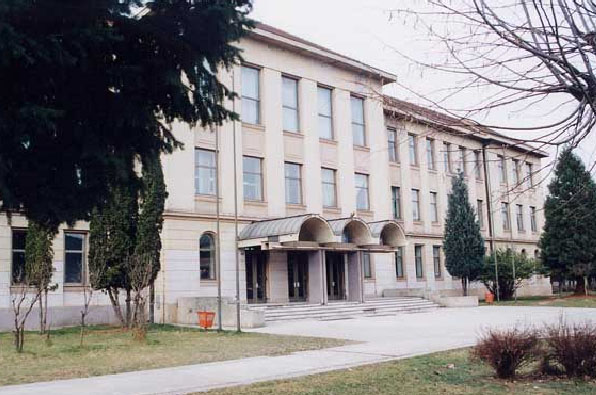
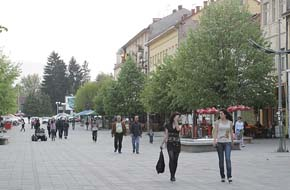
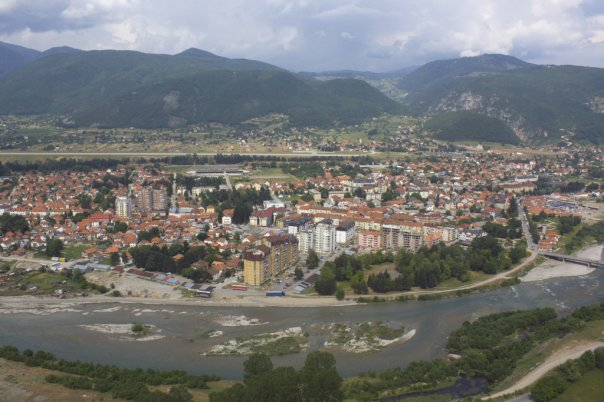
- Clockwise, from top: Berane town hall, Đurđevi stupovi monastery, Grammar School, Main square, Panorama of Berane

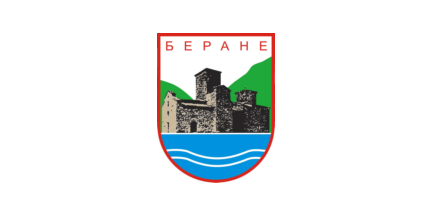
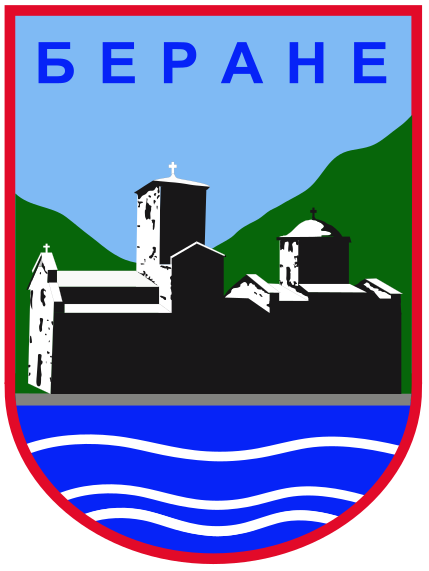
- Flag Coat of arms

- Location within Montenegro
- Coordinates: 42.84°N 19.86°E
- Country: Montenegro
- Region: Northern
- Municipality: Berane
- Founded: 1862
- Settlements: 66

Government
  - Type: Mayor-Assembly
  - Mayor: Vuko Todorović (NSD)

Area
  - Town and municipality: 496 km^{2} (192 sq mi)

Population (2023 census)
  - Rank: 7th in Montenegro
  - Density: 49/km^{2} (130/sq mi)
  - Urban: 9,532 ▼
  - Rural: 15,113 ▼
  - Municipality: 24,645 ▼
- Time zone: UTC+1 (CET)
  - Summer (DST): UTC+2 (CEST)
- Postal code: 84300
- Area code: +382 51
- ISO 3166-2 code: ME-03
- Car plates: BA
- Climate: Cfb
- Website: www.berane.me

Berane (Montenegrin Cyrillic: Беране) is a town in Montenegro in the Northern Region. It is former administrative centre of the Ivangrad District. The town is located on the Lim river. From 1949 to 1992, it was named Ivangrad (Montenegrin Cyrillic: Иванград) in honour to people's hero Ivan Milutinović. According to the 2023 census, the town had a population of 9,923, whereas its municipality area had 25,162 people.

During the medieval period the land of Berane was known as Budimlja (Будимља). It was of great holistic, political and economic importance in the medieval Serbian state and its rulers. Until 1455, when Turks took the city, Budimlja was part of the wider historical region of Raška, within the Medieval Serbia. Since the first Serbian Uprising until its final liberation, fights against Turks were constant. Famous battles occurred from 1825 to 1862 when the most important Rudes battle was fought on 7 April in which the Montenegrin rebels won. Berane was finally liberated in 1912. The town shared the destiny with its country being damaged in both World Wars. As Ivangrad, the town experienced prosperity and population growth, being one of the Yugoslav industrial centres. Although the Civil War in Yugoslavia did not reach Montenegro, the city suffered from it as the industry collapsed and the people started to leave it. Nowadays, Berane is one of the poorest settlements in Montenegro so most of the population lives in difficult conditions. Despite that, the town remains an important educational, medical, religious and sporting centre, having produced many successful individuals in those categories.

Berane is the administrative centre of the municipality of the same name. There are 13 elementary schools, four high schools and four institutions of higher education. Having a solid sport infrastructure, the most successful sport collectives in the town are handball club and table tennis club. Berane is connected with rest of the country by two-lane motorways. It also has an airport which hasn’t been used for a while. In 2012, Berane celebrated 150 years since its official foundation and 100 years of being part of Montenegro.

== History ==
In the Middle Ages, the area surrounding Berane was known as Budimlja. It was of great holistic, political, and economic importance in Medieval Serbia. Saint Sava, the first Serbian archbishop, founded one of the first Serbian eparchies here in 1219. The Monastery Đurđevi stupovi was built by the end of the 12th century by Prvoslav, the son of Nemanja's brother Tihomir. Many monasteries and churches tell the story on the rich holistic life of Serbs in this area. There were seven bishops and nine metropolitans. Literary and painting schools existed in this Monastery. Apart from Đurđevi stupovi, the second most important monastery in this area was Šudikovo, which was destroyed and burned by the Turks in 1738. Archbishop's throne was vacant for more than 350 years. However, the Budimlja episcopate, known as the Budimlja-Nikšić eparchy has been restored in 2002 upon the appointment of bishop Joanikije. The area of Berane municipality and its wider neighbourhood, was part of the Medieval Serbian state until 1455, when Turks took the city of Bihor and Budimlja.

During the First Serbian Uprising (1804) and Karađorđe's march to Novi Pazar, the people of this area revolted and met the Serbian dukes Anto Bogićević and Hadži-Prodan Gligorijević. Then, Mojsije Zečević, prior of Đurđevi stupovi, had the leading role among the Orthodox people of Budimlja. He was one of the closest allies of Petar I Petrović-Njegoš and Petar II Petrović-Njegoš, the archbishops and political leaders of Montenegro. Since the First Serbian Uprising until its final liberation, fights against Turks were constant, especially during the second part of the 19th century. Famous battles occurred from 1825, until 1862, but the most important one was Rudes battle on 7 April 1862, in which the Serbian and Montenegrin rebels won. Berane was finally liberated from Turks in 1912 and it was incorporated in Montenegro.

During World War II, there was a civil war in the region between Partisans (communists) and Chetniks (royalists and nationalists). During the communists' reprisals in 1944 and 1945 thousands of people were killed. From July 1949 to March 1992, Berane was known as Ivangrad as a tribute to Ivan Milutinović, and developed as one of the most important industrial centers in Montenegro. However, the city was severely affected by the economic collapse of the Yugoslav state in the late 1980s. Although its original name was restored in 1992, the town's economy didn't recover due to the sanctions imposed on Yugoslavia in the 1990s.

== Culture, education and science ==
The main impact for the development of culture of this area historically, and up to recent times, came from the Serbian Orthodox Church, or it monasteries in the area: Šudikova, Đurdjevi stupovi and other, as the cornerstones of spirituality of the Serb population. That part is later to a certain extent taken over by schools, and, more and more institutions dealing with culture.

A special role in that process was that of the Berane Gymnasium, founded in 1913. Its classrooms were a home to many prominent artists and scientists in various disciplines such as: Mihailo Lalić, Dušan Kostić, Radovan Zogović, Jovan Zonjić, Mišo Popović, Aleksandar Rafajlović, Luka Radojević and the others. The institutions in Berane that are still working in culture, there are: Cultural Centre (with the library), and Polimski Museum, with a very rich collection of valuable artefacts; and the House of the Duke Gavro Vuković, the first jurist with a university degree, a long term Minister of Foreign Affairs in the Principality of Montenegro, and the writer of famous “Memoirs” has been reconstructed, planned to be used for cultural events. Berane also has a school for primary musical education, and there are also few amateur clubs and societies in various disciplines of artistic creation.

There are 13 elementary schools, four secondary schools and one school for elementary musical education in municipality of Berane. Berane has four institutions of higher education: Faculty of management in transport and communications, Faculty of Teacher-training, Higher Medical School and Applied Computer engineering (study program of Faculty of Electrical Engineering, Podgorica). Berane, as is usually the case with small communities, does not have a specialised scientific institution, but in spite of that fact, many prominent scientists from various scientific disciplines come from here. A remarkable contribution to science was given by, among others, chemist Vukić Mićović, bacteriologist Milutin Đurišić, geographer Milisav Lutovac, and historian Miomir Dašić.

== Economy, infrastructure and sports ==
The municipality of Berane is one of the poorest in Montenegro. The level of industrial production is very low, since a big number of companies have stopped working in the past 15 years due to the known crisis in former Yugoslavia. In the earlier period (1960s and 1970s) many village, agricultural households have moved to the town in the process of “industrialisation”, which decreased agricultural production, and industry later collapsed so most of the population lives in difficult conditions. Many small private companies have been started recently, mostly in the areas of commerce and catering industry. There is a very small number of companies that are creating new value. Workers in those new companies have no insurance or health service, so those companies do not have a bigger positive impact on the community. Total number of employed in the municipality is approximately 3,000. However, industry is starting to come back, a coal mine has started, and new commercial buildings are popping up. More residents are finally appearing. Berane is connected with rest of Montenegro by two-lane roads. Bijelo Polje is 35 km away, where there lies the major junction (railway and the road) towards Podgorica and the coast, and to Serbia. Serbia can also be reached eastwards via Rožaje (for Novi Pazar). Berane is on the corridor of the future Bar-Boljare motorway. Berane has an airport, which hasn't been used for commercial traffic since the 1980s, although there have been plans for its revitalisation and usage as a regional airport. Podgorica Airport is some 150 km (93 mi) away, and has regular flights to and from major European destinations.

Berane has solid sport infrastructure. The most successful sport collectives are: handball club Berane and table tennis club Budim. There are also football club Berane, basketball club Lim, boxing club Radnički Berane, athletic club, tennis club etc. The Sports Centre consists of many sport objects. City Stadium with capacity of 11,000 people is the second largest stadium in Montenegro. Just next to the stadium, a new modern city hall is under construction.

== Demographics ==
Berane is administrative centre of Berane Municipality, which in 2023 had a population of 24,645. The town itself had a population of 9,532.

Historical population
Year	Pop.	±%
1948	3,701	—
1953	4,513	+21.9%
1961	6,969	+54.4%
1971	11,164	+60.2%
1981	12,720	+13.9%
1991	12,267	−3.6%
2003	11,776	−4.0%
2011	11,073	−6.0%
2023	9,532	−13.9%

=== Ethnicity ===
According to the 2023 census, the town's population is ethnically diverse, with Serbs forming the majority at 51.36%. Montenegrins comprise 30.87% of the inhabitants, followed by Bosniaks 8.54%, and ethnic Muslims 4.29%. Other ethnic groups account for 2.28% of the population, while 2.65% of residents chose not to declare their ethnicity.

=== Religion ===
Religion in Berane (2023)
1. Eastern Orthodoxy (73.8%)
2. Islam (23.3%)
3. Irreligion (0.88%)
4. Other religion (0.52%)
5. Undeclared (1.34%)

== Climate ==
Climate data for Berane (1961–1990, extremes 1950–present)
Month	Jan	Feb	Mar	Apr	May	Jun	Jul	Aug	Sep	Oct	Nov	Dec	Year
Record high °C (°F)	18.8 (65.8)	24.1 (75.4)	26.5 (79.7)	31.6 (88.9)	33.9 (93.0)	35.2 (95.4)	38.4 (101.1)	40.4 (104.7)	36.8 (98.2)	32.3 (90.1)	24.1 (75.4)	20.2 (68.4)	40.4 (104.7)
Mean daily maximum °C (°F)	2.7 (36.9)	5.9 (42.6)	10.6 (51.1)	15.2 (59.4)	20.4 (68.7)	23.3 (73.9)	25.9 (78.6)	26.1 (79.0)	22.4 (72.3)	17.2 (63.0)	10.2 (50.4)	3.4 (38.1)	15.3 (59.5)
Daily mean °C (°F)	−2.0 (28.4)	0.7 (33.3)	4.5 (40.1)	8.7 (47.7)	13.4 (56.1)	16.4 (61.5)	18.3 (64.9)	17.7 (63.9)	14.0 (57.2)	9.2 (48.6)	4.3 (39.7)	−0.5 (31.1)	8.7 (47.7)
Mean daily minimum °C (°F)	−5.9 (21.4)	−3.9 (25.0)	−0.9 (30.4)	2.7 (36.9)	6.4 (43.5)	9.5 (49.1)	10.9 (51.6)	10.3 (50.5)	7.5 (45.5)	3.4 (38.1)	0.0 (32.0)	−4.2 (24.4)	3.0 (37.4)
Record low °C (°F)	−28.3 (−18.9)	−26 (−15)	−18.6 (−1.5)	−9.2 (15.4)	−4.2 (24.4)	0.2 (32.4)	1.2 (34.2)	2.2 (36.0)	−6.1 (21.0)	−7.7 (18.1)	−19.8 (−3.6)	−22.7 (−8.9)	−28.3 (−18.9)
Average precipitation mm (inches)	82.7 (3.26)	65.5 (2.58)	63.1 (2.48)	81.9 (3.22)	70.9 (2.79)	71.6 (2.82)	60.5 (2.38)	60.6 (2.39)	66.3 (2.61)	74.9 (2.95)	114.9 (4.52)	100.4 (3.95)	913.3 (35.95)
Average precipitation days (≥ 0.1 mm)	12	11	12	13	13	13	10	9	9	9	14	14	139
Average relative humidity (%)	83	78	73	70	70	71	69	70	76	78	81	85	75
Source: Hydrological and Meteorological Service of Montenegro

== Sports ==
The local football team is FK Berane, who have spent several seasons in the country's top tier. They share their Berane City Stadium with lower league side FK Napredak. The town's handball team is RK Berane. The local basketball team is KK Lim Berane, a participant in the Prva A Liga.

== Twin towns – sister cities ==
Berane is twinned with:

- Belgrade, Serbia
- Çiğli, Turkey
- Čukarica, Belgrade; Serbia
- Dudelange, Luxembourg
- Esch-sur-Alzette, Luxembourg
- Karaisalı, Turkey
- Kostroma, Russia
- Peja, Kosovo
- Staro Nagoričane, North Macedonia
- Subotica, Serbia
- Teramo, Italy
- Vrnjačka Banja, Serbia
- Zavidovići, Bosnia and Herzegovina

== Notable individuals ==
Despite all the problems, the town remains an important educational, medical, religional and sport centre having produced many successful individuals in those categories:

Artists

- Dejan Čukić, actor
- Boban Rajović, singer
- Ljubomir Bandović, actor
- Zvonko Lepetić, (Note: Prominent Croatian and Yugoslavian actor. Starred in Balkan Spy.)

Athletes

- Dragoslav Jevrić, football goalkeeper (Note: Member of Serbia and Montenegro for the 2006 FIFA World Cup.)
- Stefan Babović, football player
- Ivan Đurković, handball player
- Sanja Premović, handball player
- Ema Alivodić, handball player
- Sonja Barjaktarović, handball goalkeeper (Note: Member of 2012 European Women's Handball Championship winning-Montenegrin national team.)
- Milonja Đukić, football player
- Igor Vušurović, volleyball player (Note: Member of winning-2000 Summer Olympics Yugoslavian Men's National Team.)
- Mijajlo Marsenić, handball player
- Maja Savić, handball player (Note: Best Left Wing of the World in 2001.)
- Zoran Bojović, football player
- Vladan Savić, football player
- Dragan Popović, football coach
- Aleksandar Šćekić, football player
- Nemanja Šćekić, football player
- Siniša Dobrašinović, football player
- Elsad Zverotić, football player

Political, educational and historical figures

- Jevstatije I, Serbian Archbishop (Note: The sixth Serbian Archbishop, holding the office from 1279 to 1286.)
- Žarko Obradović, politician (Note: Minister of Education and Science in the Government of Serbia.)
- Momčilo Cemović, politician
- Gavro Vuković, senator
- Fahrudin Radončić, politician
- Selmo Cikotić, politician (Note: Minister of Defence of Bosnia and Herzegovina.)
- Šerbo Rastoder, historian
- Miomir Dašić, historian (Note: Member of Montenegrin Academy of Sciences and Arts.)

Others and related people

- Milovan Đilas, politician
- Pavle Đurišić, officer
- Radovan Zogović, poet
- Dragoslav Šekularac, football player
- Jelena Janković, tennis player
- Dragan Nikolić, actor
- Aleksandar Šapić, water polo player
- Miodrag Bulatović, novelist

== Gallery ==
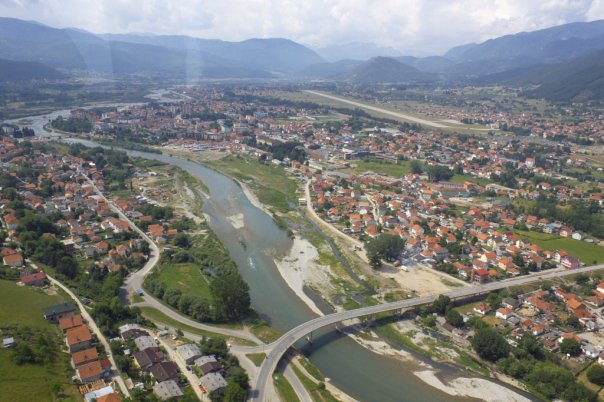
Panorama of Berane

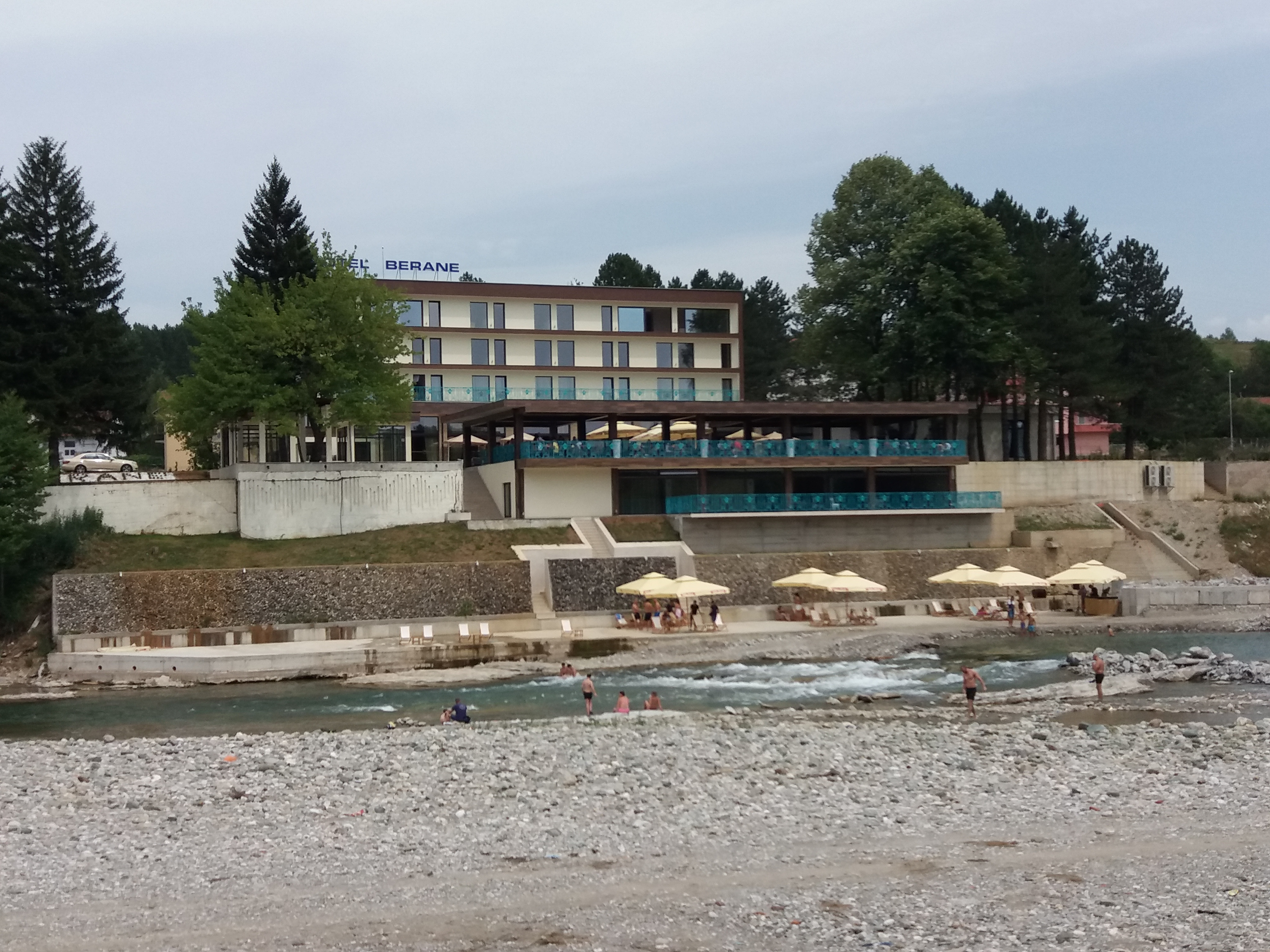
Hotel Berane, one of the town's symbols, renovated in 2017

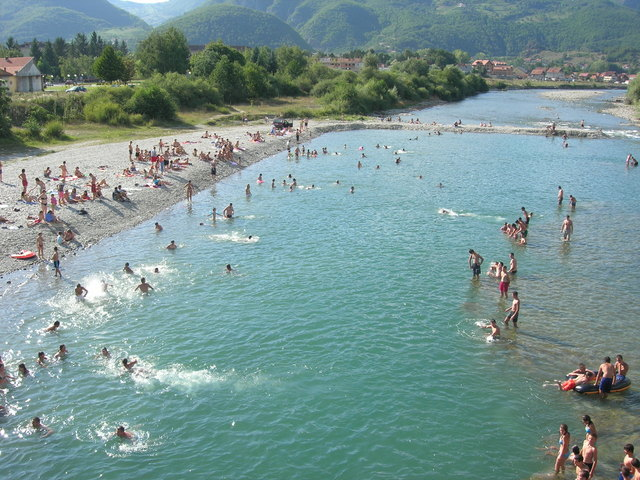
Beach at the Lim river

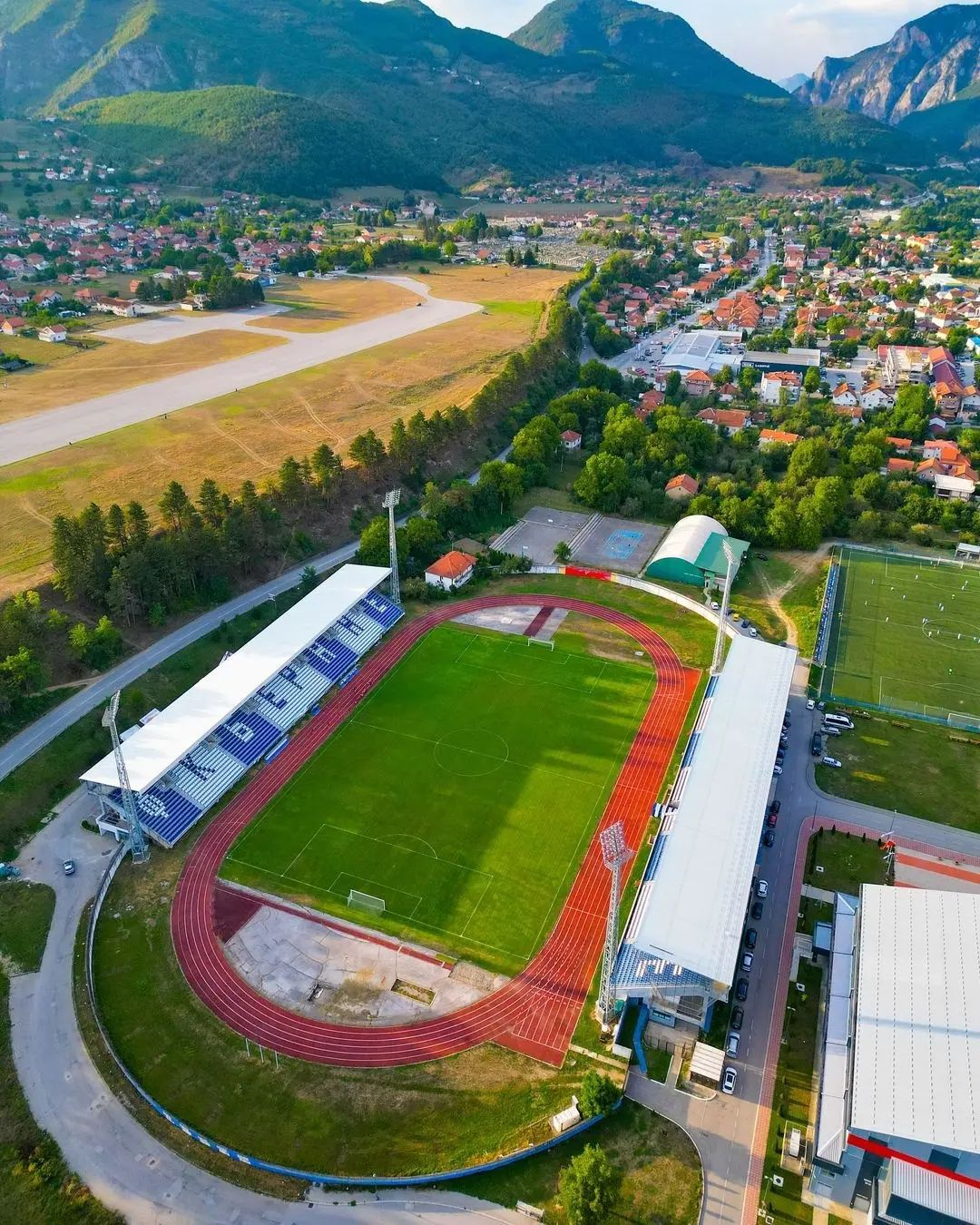
City stadium

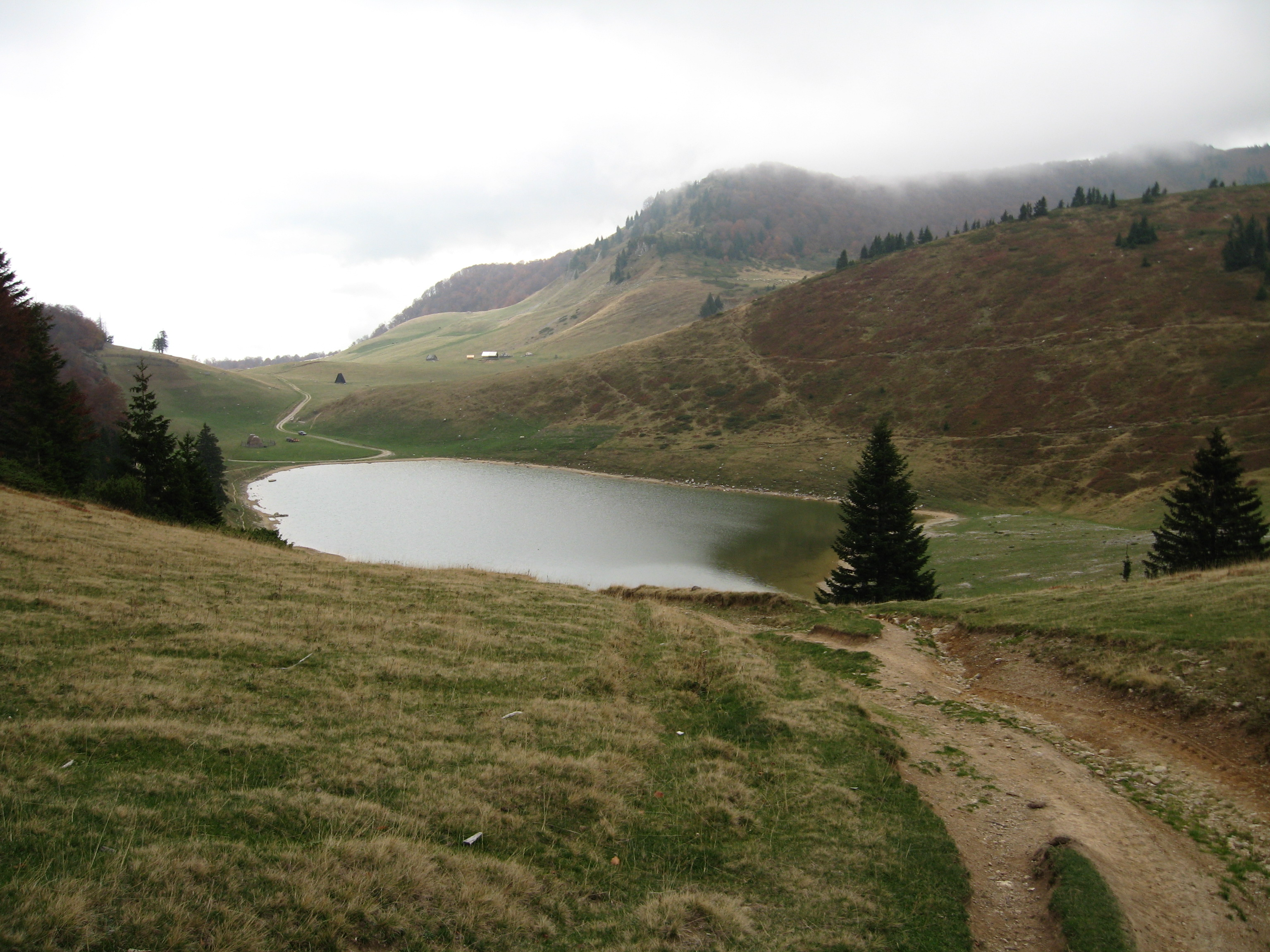
Šiš lake near Berane, Bjelasica mountain

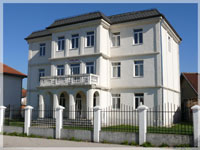
Musical school in Berane

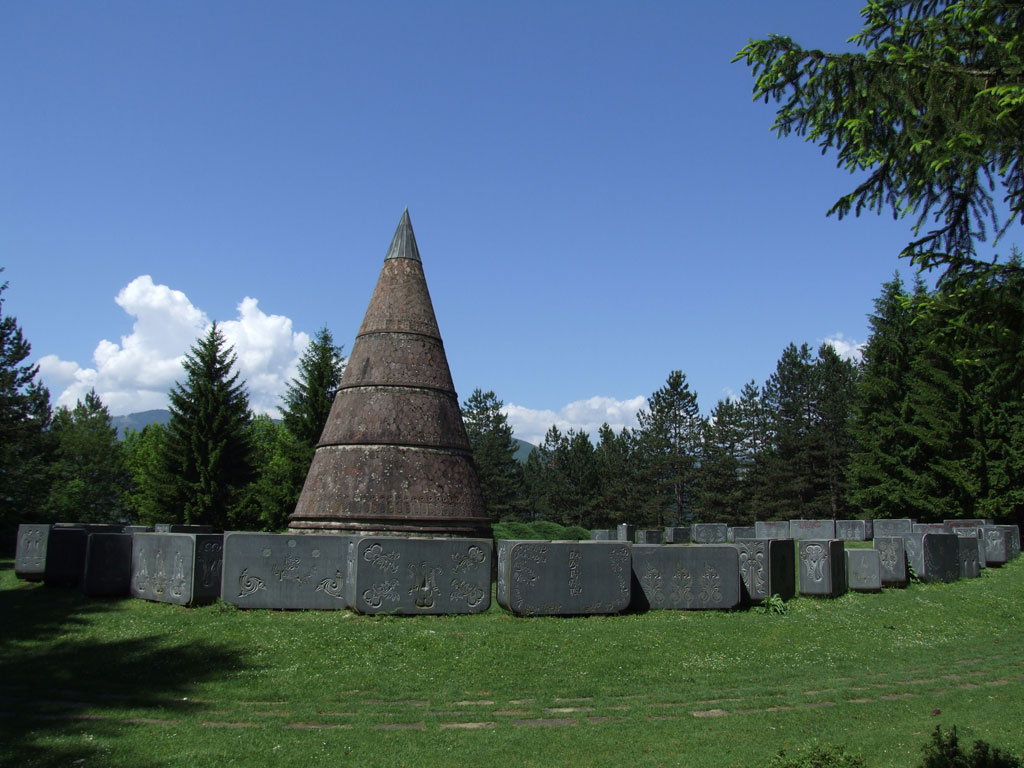
Jasikovac WWII monument

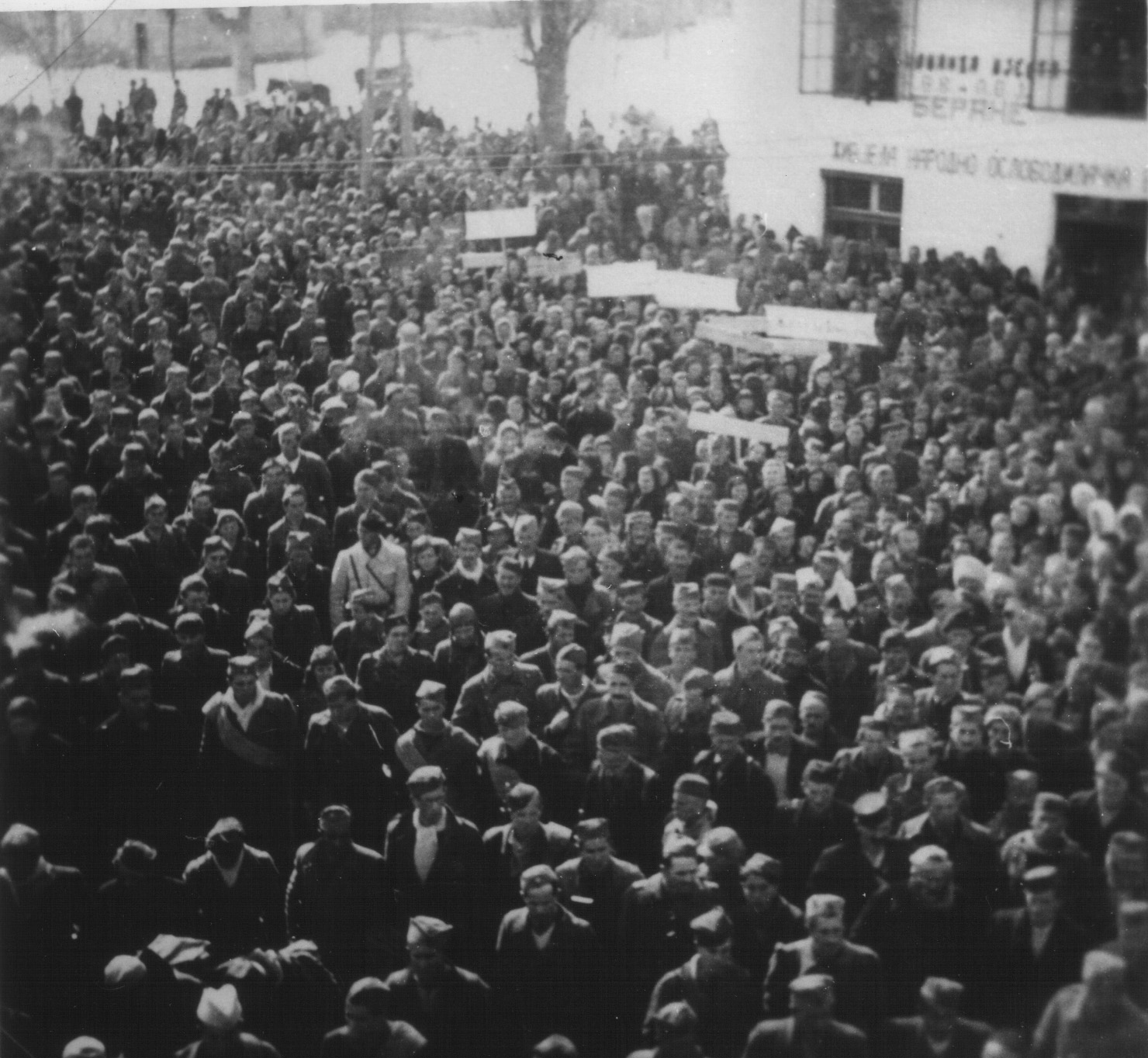
Forming of the Eight Montenegrin Brigade in 1944..

== Notes ==
Notes
