= Berane Municipality =

Municipality of Montenegro

Berane Municipality Opština Berane Општина Беране
- Municipality
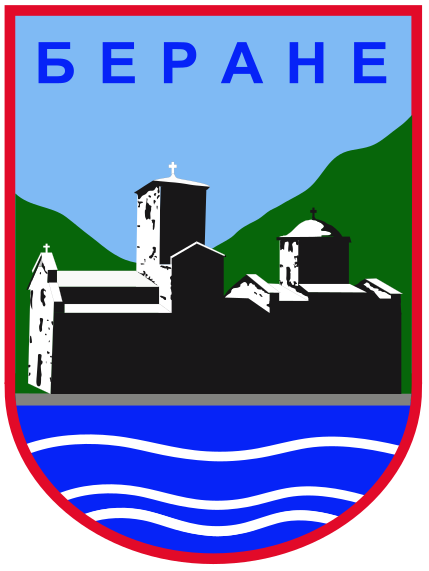
- Coat of arms

- Berane Municipality in Montenegro
- Country: Montenegro
- Seat: Berane

Area
  - Total: 544 km^{2} (210 sq mi)

Population (2023)
  - Total: 24,645
  - Density: 45.3/km^{2} (117/sq mi)
- Time zone: UTC+1 (CET)
  - Summer (DST): UTC+2 (CEST)
- Postal code: 84300
- Area code: +382 51
- ISO 3166-2 code: ME-03
- Car plates: BA
- Climate: Cfb
- Website: berane.me

Berane Municipality (Montenegrin: Opština Berane, Општина Беране) is one of the municipalities in Northern Montenegro. Its center is the town of Berane and until 2013, it covered an area of 544 km^{2}. In 2013, however, the Petnjica Municipality was formed out of the eastern part of the Berane Municipality. In 2023, the population of the Berane Municipality was 24,645.

== Geography and location ==
Berane is located in the northeastern part of Montenegro, in the Lim River valley region between the peaks of Bjelasica in the west, Cmiljevica in the east, Tivran gorge in the north, being part of the Sandžak region. Berane has a very favorable geographical position, since it is connected by the main road to Serbia, via Rožaje, and Kosovo, via Chakor. The Lim valley is also connected by the main road to the southern part of Serbia and the southeastern part of Bosnia and Herzegovina.

=== City Assembly (2024–2028) ===
The municipal parliament consists of 34 deputies elected directly for a four-year term.

Party / Coalition	Seats	Local government
ZBCG (NSD–DNP)	7 / 34	Government
PES	6 / 34	Government
SNP	6 / 34	Government
DPS	5 / 34	Opposition
DCG	4 / 34	Government
ZŠVB	2 / 34	Government
BS	2 / 34	Support
SCG	1 / 34	Government
UCG	1 / 34	Government

== Demographics ==
According to the 2023 census, the municipality of Berane had a population of 24,645, with the following ethnic composition:

Berane (2023)
Serbs	59.82%
Montenegrins	26.57%
Bosniaks	4.48%
Others	9.13%

Berane (2023)
Eastern Orthodox	82.71%
Islam	15.01%
Roman Catholic	0.25%
Others	2.03%

== Gallery ==
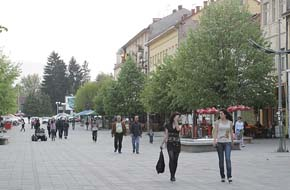
Town of Berane

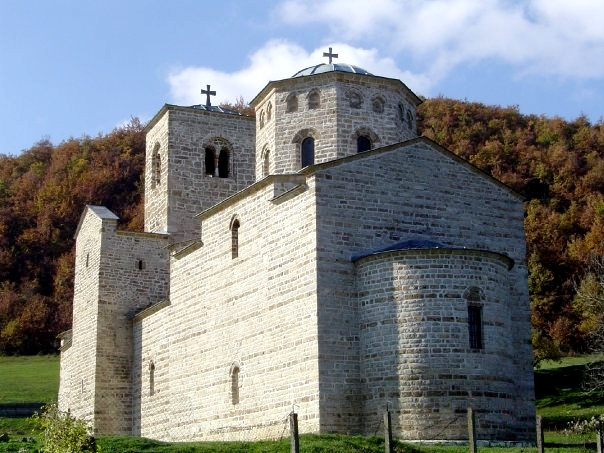
Đurđevi Stupovi

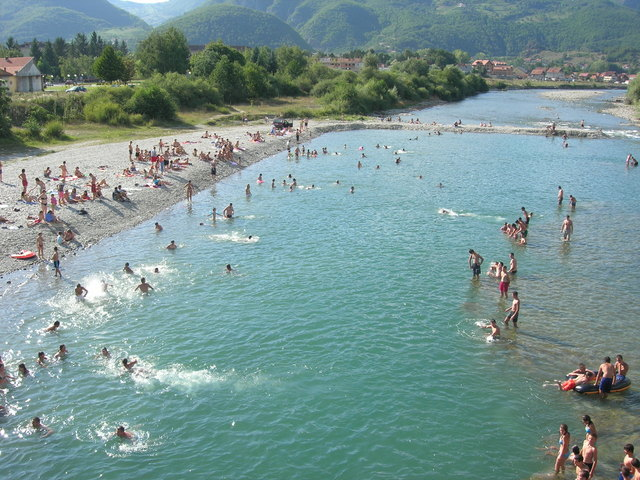
Beach at the Lim river

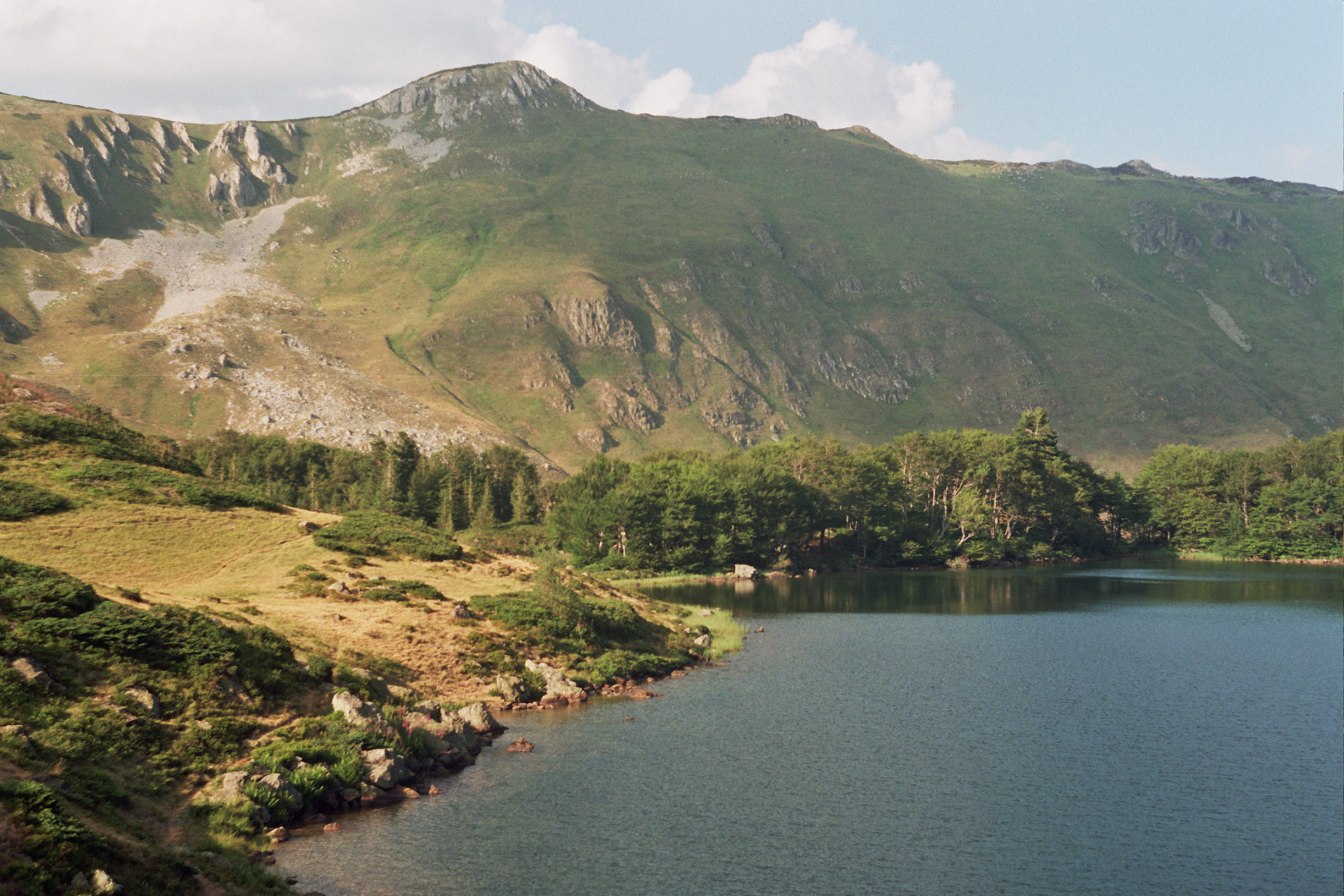
Lake Pešića, Bjelasica

== See also ==
- Petnjica Municipality, part of the Berane Municipality until 2013.
