= Alija Balijagić =

Alija B
- Born: c. 1960; Potkrajci, near Bijelo Polje, SFR Yugoslavia
- Status: In custody
- Other names: "The Village Bandit", "The Rapist"
- Known for: Double murder in Sokolac, Bijelo Polje (October 2024)
- Criminal penalty: Multiple convictions totaling approximately 38 years in prison

Alija Balijagić (born c. 1960) is a Montenegrin criminal known for multiple violent offenses, including rape and murder. He was suspected of murdering 17-year-old Aleksandra Petrović in Priboj, Serbia, in 2001, although no charges were filed due to insufficient evidence.

In 2016, he was convicted of raping a 75-year-old woman in Bijelo Polje. He gained further notoriety in 2024 after committing a double murder in the village of Sokolac, Montenegro, which sparked a major manhunt and cross-border police operation.

He has served multiple prison sentences throughout his life and is considered one of the most notorious contemporary criminals in Montenegro and Serbia.

== Background ==
Alija Balijagić (born c. 1960) is a Montenegrin criminal with a history of violent offenses. He was born in Potkrajci, near Bijelo Polje, in the former SFR Yugoslavia. Over the past four decades, he has been convicted multiple times for various crimes, including rape, theft, and murder. His most recent crime was a double murder in the village of Sokolac, near Bijelo Polje, in October 2024.

== 2001 murder ==
In 2001, Balijagić was suspected of murdering a 17-year-old girl named Aleksandra Petrović in Priboj, Serbia. She had gone missing after leaving her home to visit a store and was later found dead in a basement with multiple head injuries. Balijagić was investigated for the crime, but due to insufficient evidence, no formal charges were filed at the time.

== 2016 rape conviction ==
In 2016, Balijagić was convicted of the rape of a 75-year-old woman in a suburban settlement in Bijelo Polje. The crime occurred on 30 October 2015, when he entered the woman's home, assaulted her, and raped her. During the trial, he denied the charges, claiming it was a setup. He was sentenced to seven years in prison for this offense.

== 2024 double murder ==
On the night of 25 October 2024, Balijagić committed a double murder in the village of Sokolac, near Bijelo Polje. He killed his brother Jovan Madžgalj (60) and sister Milenka Madžgalj (69) by shooting them through a window of their family home. After the murders, he stole several items from the house. The crime shocked the local community and led to a manhunt involving police forces from Montenegro and Serbia.

== Manhunt and arrest ==
Following the double murder, Balijagić fled into the mountainous regions near the border of Montenegro and Serbia. He evaded capture for several weeks, despite extensive search efforts by police and military units. On 22 November 2024, he was arrested in the village of Goleša, near Priboj, Serbia, without resistance. He was found in a house where he was staying, and authorities seized firearms and other weapons during the arrest.

== Criminal record ==
Balijagić has a long history of criminal activity. He has been convicted of various crimes over the years, including:

=== 2001 murder ===
Suspected of murdering 17-year-old Aleksandra Petrović in Priboj; no charges filed due to insufficient evidence.

=== 2016 rape ===
Convicted of raping a 75-year-old woman in Bijelo Polje in 2015.

=== Theft and assault ===
Involved in multiple thefts and assaults throughout the 2000s and 2010s.

In total, he has served nearly four decades in prison, with approximately 15 years spent in solitary confinement.

== Legal proceedings ==
Following his arrest, Balijagić was transferred to Serbia, where he faces charges related to the double murder. The Montenegrin authorities have requested his extradition to stand trial in Montenegro for the killings. The legal proceedings are ongoing, and he faces a potential sentence of up to 40 years in prison if convicted.
