= Manhunt (law enforcement) =

Extensive and thorough search for a wanted fugitive

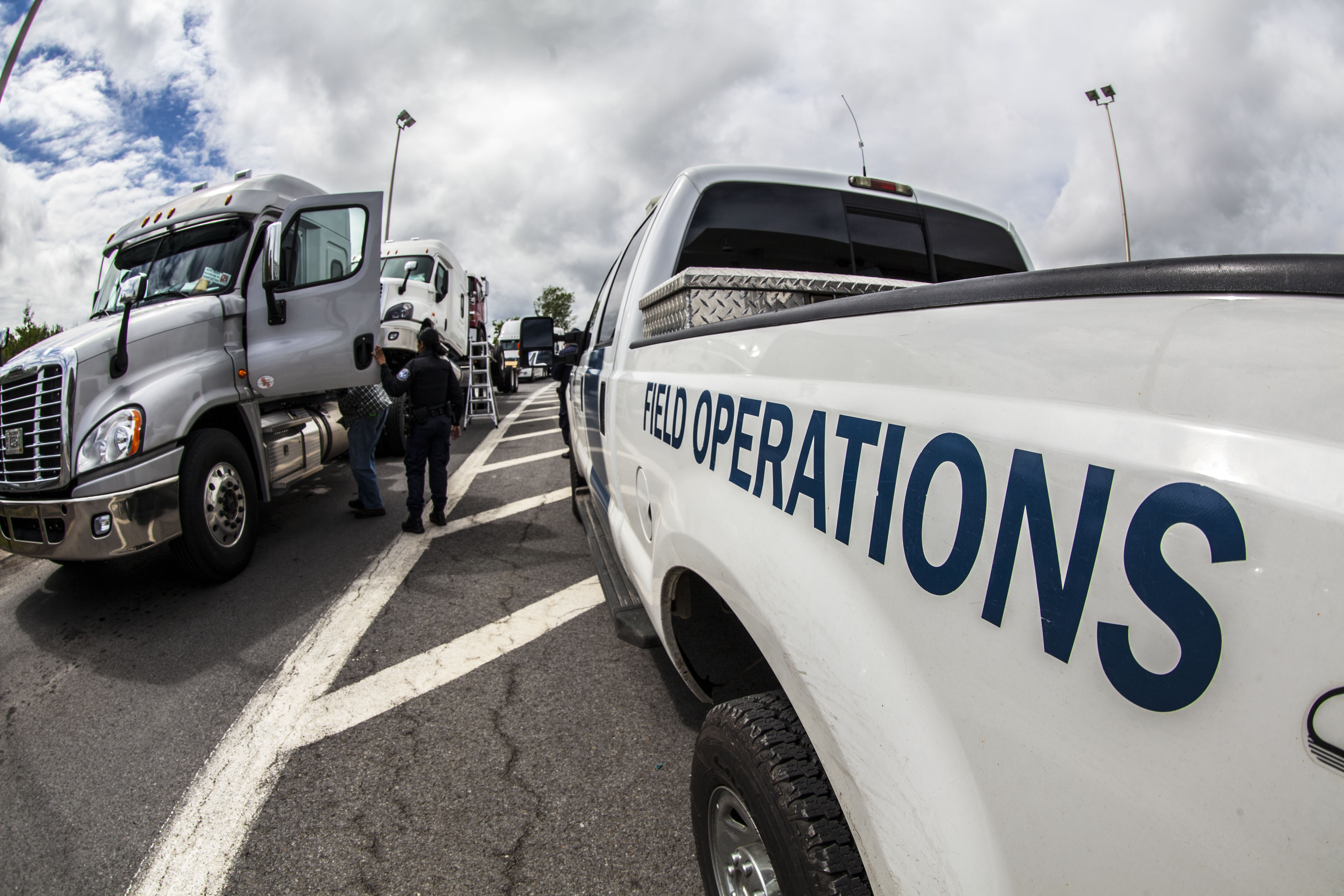
CBP officers at the Area Port of Champlain conducting 100% inspection of all truck traffic at the Area Port of Champlain in June 2015 looking for Richard Matt and David Sweat

In law enforcement, a manhunt is a systematic search for a suspected criminal.

A manhunt is conducted when the suspect believed to be responsible for a serious crime is at large and is believed to be within a certain area. Any police units within reach of the area will then participate in the search, each covering parts of the area. If possible, the officers will form a perimeter around the area, guarding any and all possible escape routes from the containment.

A manhunt may have one of the following outcomes:

- The successful capture of the suspect within the area of the manhunt.
- The death of the suspect within the area of the manhunt.
- Escape from the area by the suspect, followed by plans by other law enforcement agencies to search for the suspect elsewhere.
- The search being called off, if police determine the chances of catching the suspect are minimal.

Also, if the fugitive uses deadly force to resist law enforcement officers, the officers are typically authorized to deploy deadly force to subdue the fugitive.

== Fugitive manhunt agencies and organizations ==
- AFOSI
- Bounty hunter
- British Security Service (MI5)
  - Greater London Metropolitan Police
- Federal Bureau of Investigation
  - FBI Hostage Rescue Team
- INTERPOL
- Royal Canadian Mounted Police
- Special Weapons and Tactics (SWAT) Teams
- Texas Ranger Division of the Texas Department of Public Safety
- US Marshals Service
- Central Reserve Police Force
  - CoBRA

== Public involvement ==
Sometimes, police departments conducting manhunts will solicit help from the public in locating the suspect. They will do this by broadcasting a description and other information on television, radio, and other public media, by going door to door and asking individuals if they have seen the suspect, and by placing wanted posters in public places.

When this happens, citizens are advised not to personally confront the suspect, but rather to call police and report their sightings.

One type of manhunt for which public participation is normally sought is an Amber alert. In an Amber alert, the main purpose of the mission is to rescue the victim, ahead of the capture of the suspect. The public is usually given notice of an Amber alert through additional forms of media, including highway overhead signs and text messaging.

If anyone is found aiding the suspect in any way, such as helping the suspect in hiding, or providing false information to the police about the suspect, may face legal consequences themselves, even being charged for the same crime as the suspect.

== Notable manhunts ==
- Porepunkah police shootings (Dezi Freeman)
- 2025 Anaconda shooting (Michael Paul Brown)
- 2026 Lake Cargelligo shootings (Julian Ingram)
- Jacek Jaworek
- Alija Balijagić
- Stara Wieś shooting (Tadeusz Duda)
- 1993 shootings at CIA Headquarters
- 2001 anthrax attacks
- 2023 Austin shootings
- 2025 shootings of Minnesota legislators
- 2025 Brown University shooting (Claudio Manuel Neves Valente)
- Dan D. B. Cooper
- 2010 Northumbria Police manhunt
- 2015 death of Joe Gliniewicz
- 2019 Northern British Columbia murders
- Robert Card
- Adam Yahiye Gadahn
- Adolf Eichmann
- Albert Johnson
- Aribert Heim
- Assassination of Charlie Kirk
- Beltway sniper attacks and search for John Allen Muhammad and Lee Boyd Malvo
- Bojinka plot (Abdul Hakim Murad, Wali Khan Amin Shah)
- Bonnie and Clyde
- Cascade Mall shooting (Arcan Cetin)
- 2025 Coeur d'Alene shooting (Wess Roley)
- Charleston Church shooting (Dylann Roof)
- Christopher Jordan Dorner
- 2023 Cleveland, Texas shooting (Francisco Oropeza)
- Crocus City Hall attack
- Dennis Rader
- Elias Huizar
- Eric Matthew Frein
- Henry Every
- Herman Perry
- Joseph A. Couch
- 2022 University of Idaho killings (Bryan Kohberger)
- Jack Unterweger
- Mohammed Emwazi (Jihadi John)
- John Dillinger
- John Wilkes Booth
- 2024 Joliet shootings (Romeo Nance)
- Josef Mengele
- Joseph Palczynski
- 2023 Los Angeles spree shootings (Jerrid Joseph Powell)
- Killing of Brian Thompson
- Jürgen Conings
- Malcolm Naden
- Maurice Clemmons, see also Lakewood shootings
- 2023 Monterey Park shooting (Huu Can Tran)
- 2016 Munich shooting (Ali Sonboly)
- Nashville Waffle House shooting (Travis Reinking)
- 2022 New York City Subway attack (Frank James)
- Robert Vesco
- Stanley Graham
- The Green River Killer (Gary Ridgway)
- The Yorkshire Ripper (Peter Sutcliffe)
- Abdelhamid Abaaoud
- Abdeslam Salah
- Decker children killings (Travis Decker)
- Veerappan
- Willie Boy
- Zodiac Killer

=== Bombing suspects ===
- 1993 World Trade Center bombing (Ramzi Yousef, Abdul Rahman Yasin)
- Ahmad Khan Rahimi
- Abu Ali al-Harithi
- Boston Marathon bombing (Dzhokhar and Tamerlan Tsarnaev)
- Centennial Olympic Park bombing (Eric Rudolph)
- Khalid Sheikh Mohammed
- Oklahoma City bombing (Terry Nichols)
- Osama bin Laden
- Pan Am Flight 73 (Zayd Hassan Abd Al-Latif Masud Al Safarini)
- Pan Am Flight 103
- Pan Am Flight 103 bombing investigation
- Ted Kaczynski (Unabomber)
- TWA Flight 847

=== Prison escapees ===
- 2010 Arizona prison escape
- 2015 Clinton Correctional Facility escape (Richard Matt and David Sweat)
- Aafia Siddiqui
- Ante Gotovina
- Charles Victor Thompson
- Clark Rockefeller
- Clovis, New Mexico jail break
- Frank Morris, John Anglin, and Clarence Anglin, escapees of Alcatraz during 1962. Their fates remain unknown.
- El Chapo
- Goran Hadžić
- Mas Selamat bin Kastari
- Mecklenburg Correctional Center escapees from Death Row
- Operation Crevice
- Operation Kratos
- Project Coronado - a four-year manhunt which targeted members of the La Familia Michoacana drug cartel.
- Radovan Karadžić
- Ratko Mladić
- Texas Seven
- Danelo Cavalcante
- Michael Burham
- Gino Hagenkotter
- TJ Lane
- 2025 New Orleans jailbreak
- Daniel Khalife, escaped HM Prison Wandsworth in 2022.

== See also ==
- Bounty hunter
- Deadly force
- Interpol
- List of murderers by number of victims
- Lone wolf (terrorism)
- Manhunt (military)
- Mexican drug war
- War crime
