= Los Angeles shooting =

Los Angeles shooting may refer to:

- 1973 South Los Angeles shootings
- 1984 49th Street Elementary School shooting
- 1991 killing of Latasha Harlins in Vermont Vista, Los Angeles
- 1997 North Hollywood shootout in North Hollywood, Los Angeles
- 1999 Los Angeles Jewish Community Center shooting
- 2002 Los Angeles International Airport shooting
- 2013 Los Angeles International Airport shooting
- 2023 Los Angeles spree shootings

== See also ==
- Los Angeles airport shooting
