= Sexual abuse scandal in the Roman Catholic Archdiocese of Chicago =

Events in Catholic Church child sexual abuse scandal in America

The sexual abuse scandal in the Roman Catholic Archdiocese of Chicago in the late 20th and early 21st century is a major chapter in the series of Catholic sex abuse cases in the United States. The archdiocese is located in the northern part of the State of Illinois.

A 2023 report by the Illinois Attorney General found that more than 450 Catholic clergy in Illinois abused nearly 2,000 children since 1950. It highlighted in particular the Roman Catholic Diocese of Joliet in Illinois as a source of abuse.

== Actions by archdiocese ==
In 1991, Archbishop Joseph Bernardin established a commission of lay people to review the procedures followed by the archdiocese in handling allegations of sexual abuse. The commission also reviewed the personnel files of 2,252 priests who had served in the archdiocese since 1963. The commission concluded that 39 of those priests had credible allegations of sexual abuse. When Bernardin released the commission report in June 1992, only eight of those priests were still alive.

Following the commission recommendations, Bernardin in September 1992 established an Office of Victim Assistance to support sexual abuse survivors and their families. This office was considered the first of its kind in the United States. Also in 1992, Bernadine established the Office of Child Abuse Investigations and Review, meant to investigate all sexual abuse complaints. The office had the power to remove a priest from his assignment within 48 hours of receiving a complaint. The board, all lay people, included a social worker, a clinical psychologist, a psychiatrist and a software programmer.

When Bernardin in 1994 was personally accused of sexual misconduct in a lawsuit by former seminarian Stephen Cook, Bernardin submitted himself to the Office of Child Abuse Investigations. Cook subsequently dropped Bernardin from his lawsuit, who ministered to Cook before his death. Bernardin died in 1996. His replacement, Francis George, was consecrated as archbishop in 1997.

Cardinal George in 2006 created a commission to investigate the archdiocesan responses to sexual abuse allegations against Reverend Daniel McCormack. The commission found that George failed to remove McCormack from his assignment in the Fall of 2005 after getting complaints about him. Between then and his arrest in January 2006, McCormack abused four other boys. George took some responsibility for the affair, saying, "The sins of priests and bishops destroy the Church, and I think that's what we're seeing here."

In August 2008, the archdiocese reached settlements totaling $12,675,000 with 16 survivors of sexual abuse by McCormack and ten other priests. Cardinal George released this statement:

My hope is that these settlements will help the survivors and their families begin to heal and move forward...I apologize again today to the survivors and their families and to the whole Catholic community. We must continue to do everything in our power to ensure the safety of the children in our care.

In January 2014, the archdiocese released 6,000 pages of documents on the sexual abuses allegations against 30 priests. Cardinal George resigned as archbishop of Chicago in April 2014 and Bishop Blase Cupich was installed in November 2014 as his replacement. That same month, the archdiocese released documents on 36 more priests with credible accusations of sexual abuse against minors.

Cupich had supported a zero-tolerance policy to control abuses in the church. He believed that ordained and lay Catholics who engaged in any kind of sex abuse of minors- or those applying to ministry who were found to have done so- should be prohibited from ministry with children. He also said that authorities should be notified for investigation. He also proposed a policy to deal with cases that are revealed through the sacrament of confession and Penance (where nothing at all can ordinarily be disclosed without very, very special procedures). In August 2015, he acted to suspend Reverend Octavio Munoz Capetillo, the pastor of Saint Pancratius Parish, from all duties because of allegations against him, and to notify and cooperate with the authorities.

All allegations made to the archdiocese of past or present conduct are reported to the Illinois States Attorney's office and, if involving a current minor, to the Illinois Department of Children and Family Services. Of these allegations, the archdiocese investigates only matters involving current priests, from the standpoint of evaluating for removal from the priesthood. All priests, employees and volunteers go through background checks every three years. They are trained in identifying suspected abuse tand in reporting requirements to authorities. identifying and reporting requirements to the authorities for suspected abuse. Children in the diocese schools and study classes receive age-appropriate training, according to the diocese. According to John O'Malley, archdiocese special counsel, "he believes the archdiocese has reported every new case of sexual abuse to authorities since 2002 and provided files of older allegations going back decades."

In March 2019, lawyers for sex abuse victims revealed that 22 names were added to the list of 77 accused Catholic clergy, bringing the total number of accused clergy to 99. The archdiocese acknowledged that names released by the lawyers were credible, with 20 of these 22 new names already reported to civil authorities by the archdiocese.

== Actions by State of Illinois ==
In the summer of 2018, Illinois Attorney General Lisa Madigan launched an investigation of sexual abuses allegations against Catholic clergy in Illinois. She issued a preliminary report in December 2018 that found allegations of sexual abuse by some 500 priests in the six dioceses in the state that had not been properly investigated. According to the archdiocese, since 2002, it has reported to authorities all claims, whether or not it investigated them, at the time the claims were made.In response to the state AG's investigation, the archdiocese reversed a previous decision by Cardinal George and released 10 more names to its public list.

On May 23, 2023, Illinois Attorney General Kwame Raoul released a final report on Catholic clergy child sex abuse in Illinois. The multi-year investigation found that more than 450 Catholic clergy in Illinois abused nearly 2,000 children since 1950. The report found that the archdiocese "has done much to improve its handling of child sex abuse claims" over the prior 30 years, but it also offered criticisms of how some allegations against priests have been handled and how survivors of priest sexual abuse are treated.

== Prominent cases ==
=== Reverend Daniel Mark Holihan ===
During the 1980s, Reverend Daniel Holihan was serving as a pastor at Our Lady of the Snows Parish in Chicago. In July 1986, a priest reported to the archdiocesan vicar for priests rumors about Holihan taking boys on overnight trips to his family cottage. The school principal also told the priest he had heard about Holihan having a relationship with two altar boys. Then a parishioner wrote to Bernardine, saying that they had witnessed Holihan fondling a boy. The vicar met with Holihan, who denied any abuse. The vicar told him to stop taking boys to the cottage.

In March 1990, the Chicago Police Department showed a video about inappropriate contact to the students at Our Lady. Six boys immediately came forward with complaints about Holihan, along with a report from a parishioner who witnessed it happening. The principal immediately reported Holihan to the Illinois Department of Children and Family Services. The archdiocese started an investigation, but seemed more interested in covering up the reports. When the State finished its investigation, the state attorney declined to prosecuted Holihan. He resigned from Our Lady in July 1990. He was then allowed to work part time at Saint Jerome Parish in Chicago.

In 2005, as more old reports of child abuse surfaced, Cardinal George finally removed Holihan from ministry. He was then confined to a nursing facility. He request laicization in 2008.

=== Reverend Robert E. Mayer ===
During the 1970s, Mayer was serving as an assistant pastor at Saint Mary Parish in Lake Forest, Illinois. During this period, Mayer was socializing with teenage boys, providing alcoholic beverages to them in the rectory. He would also show them pornography and engage in mutual masturbation with them. By the early 1980s, Reverend Robert Mayer was serving as an associate pastor at St. Edna's Parish in Arlington Heights, Illinois. During a 1982 outing with altar boys to Fox Lake, Mayer attempted to undress and fondle two of them. Staff at St. Edna's sent a complaint about Mayer to Cardinal John Cody, but the archdiocese did nothing. The parents of one victim from St. Edna's sued the archdiocese in 1983; the case was settled the next year. Mayer was transferred to St. Stephen Parish in 1983.

In 1984, a parishioner at St. Stephen reported to the archdiocese that Mayer had pornographic materials along with a photo album of teenagers passed out from alcohol consumption. Over the next several years, he was transferred to two more parishes. In 1987, the archdiocese forced Meyer to sign an agreement that he would stay away from all minors. The archdiocese finally removed from St. Odilo's Parish in July 1991 after receiving accusations that he made sexual advances to a young adult male. In December 1991, he was charged with aggravated criminal sexual abuse of a teenage girl. He was convicted and sentenced to three years in prison. The Vatican laicized Mayer in 2010. As of 2023, the archdiocese had received 53 allegations of sexual abuse against him.

=== Reverend Daniel McCormack ===
While Daniel McCormack was a seminarian in 1988, he spent time in Mexico learning Spanish. During his time there, he was accused of sexually abusing an underage male. He admitted in 1992 to making sexual advances to the boy. However, he was allowed to continue in seminary and was ordained to the priesthood in 1994. In October 1999, while serving at Holy Family Parish in Chicago, he was alleged to have sexually assaulted an altar boy. The next year, a religious sister at Holy Family School warned the archdiocese that McCormack was having inappropriate contact with some boys there. The archdiocese took no actions.

By 2000, McCormack was pastor at St. Agatha Parish and basketball coach at Our Lady of the Westside School. In September 2001, McCormack started sexually fondling a nine-year-old boy from the basketball team. The abuse occurred three to four times a month for the next three and a half years. He abused a second boy on two occasions in 2003.

In the fall of 2005, the archdiocese received accusations against McCormack from the two boys at Our Lady. The review board for the archdiocese recommend to Cardinal George that McCormack be removed from ministry, but George declined to do it. The archdiocese assigned a personal monitor to McCormack and told him to stay away from children. In January 2006, McCormack was charged with two counts of aggravated criminal sexual abuse. At that time, the archdiocese removed him from ministry. In July 2007, McCormack pleaded guilty to five counts of aggravated criminal sexual abuse and was sentenced to five years in prison.

The archdiocese in 2013 was sued by several of McCormack's victims. In July 2013, Cardinal George testified several times during the civil trial. By 2025, the archdiocese had paid at least $9 million in legal settlements to McCormack's victims, numbering at least 25. In March 2025, the archdiocese sued seven claimants who had received payments or were going to receive payments, alleging fraud.
