= Mineola Hotel =

- U.S. National Register of Historic Places
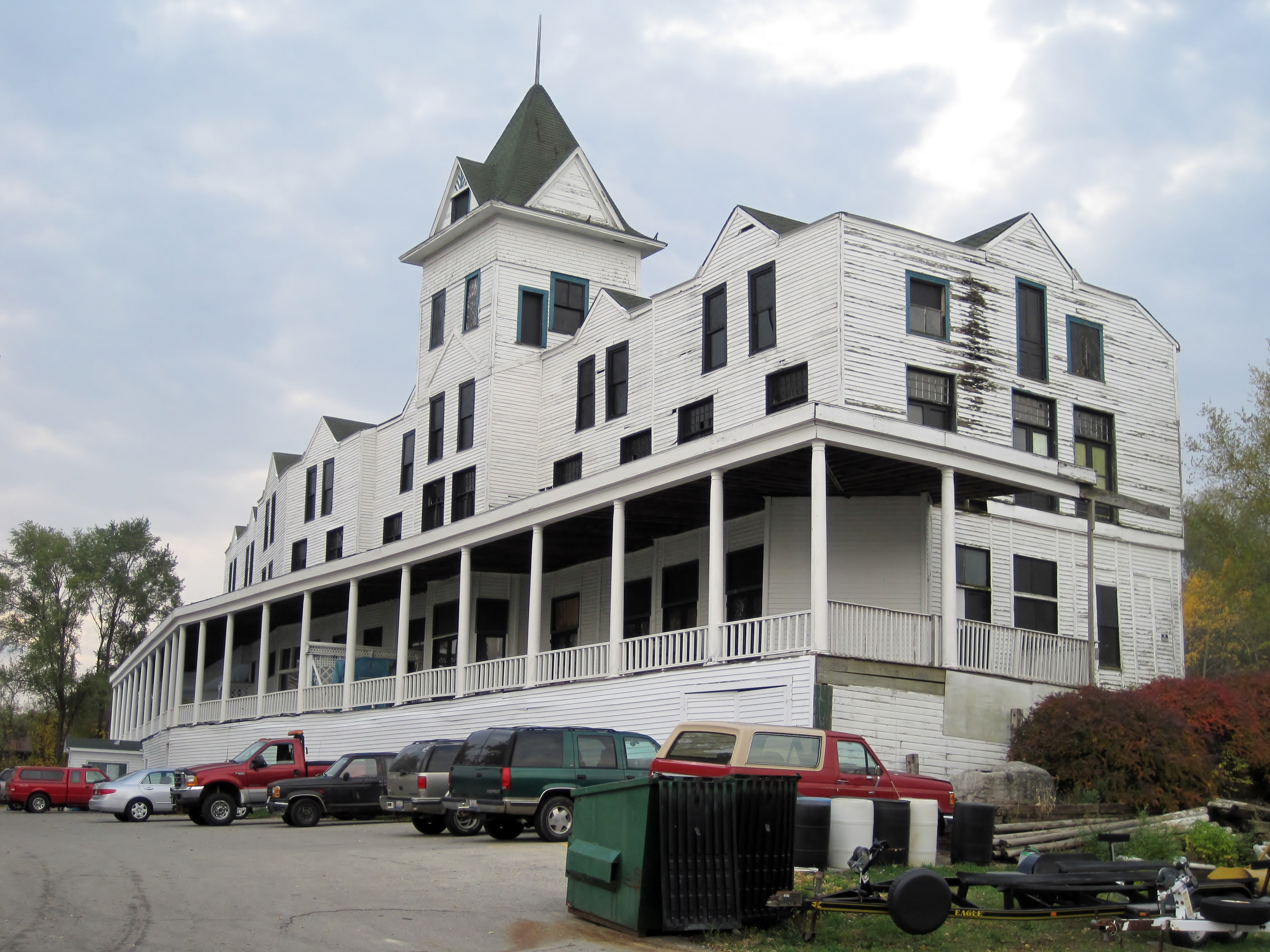

- Location within Illinois Location within the United States
- Location: 91 N. Cora St., Fox Lake, Illinois
- Coordinates: 42°24′12″N 88°10′33″W
- Area: 1 acre (0.40 ha)
- Built: 1884
- Architect: Multiple
- NRHP reference No.: 79003785
- Added to NRHP: July 29, 1979

The Mineola Hotel is a historic hotel located at 91 North Cora Street in Fox Lake, Illinois. The hotel is located on the western shore of Fox Lake, one of the lakes which forms the Chain O'Lakes.

== History ==
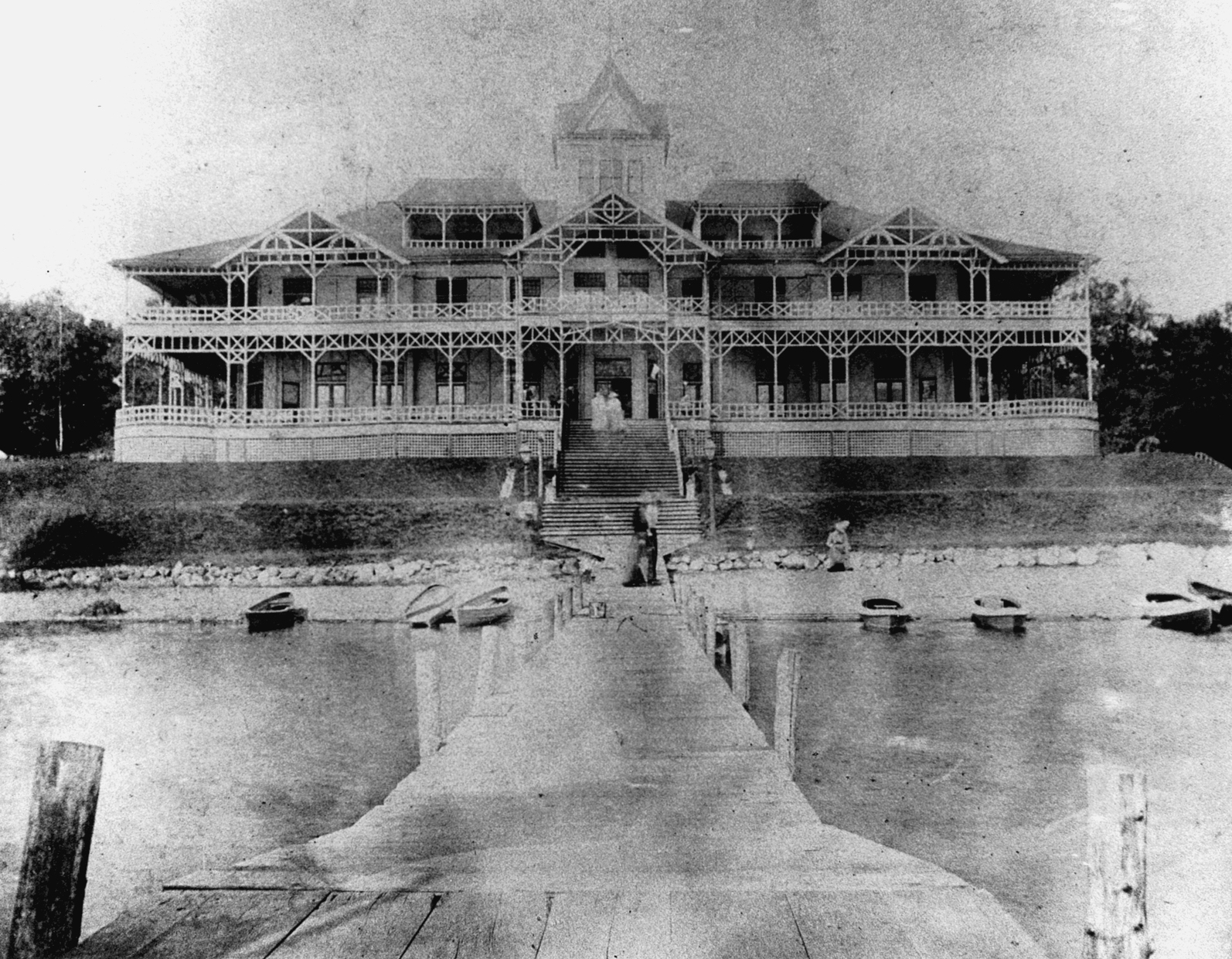
Postcard of original clubhouse

Thomas Parker purchased a tract of land along Fox Lake on behalf of the Union League Club of Chicago. The club intended to develop the property as a recreational retreat for its members and built a small clubhouse on the site. The Mineola Club of Chicago constructed the northern half of the hotel in 1888 as a clubhouse; the building became a hotel in 1891. Christen Knowles, Robert McNeil, and Charles O'Boyle were tasked with this section's construction. Edison Howard bought the hotel, opening it to the public, and built its southern half in 1903. The hotel operated as a hunting and fishing resort until it closed in 1963. Al Capone purportedly visited the hotel occasionally as a weekend retreat.

The hotel was recognized by the National Park Service with a listing to the National Register of Historic Places on July 29, 1979. A bar and restaurant operated in the building until 2012, when the village closed it due to safety concerns; the village is now considering the building's demolition. Landmarks Illinois named the hotel one of the ten most endangered historic places in Illinois in 2013.

== Architecture ==
The frame building features a three-story square tower above its front entrance, hipped dormers on each side of the tower, and a two tier verandah with Stick style ornamentation encircling three of its sides. It is the largest surviving frame building in Illinois.
