= Clovis, New Mexico jail break =

2008 jail escape

Seven of the eight Clovis, New Mexico escapees during a KRQE news report.

The Clovis, New Mexico jail break refers to an August 24, 2008, jail escape from the Curry County Adult Detention Center.

Eight inmates, all charged with violent crimes, broke out of the Clovis, New Mexico jail by climbing up plumbing pipes in a narrow space inside a wall and using handmade instruments to cut a hole in the roof near a skylight. The process took about seven hours, and the escape was the culmination of several days of planning. The inmates gained access to the pipes by stealing a key left in a door lock while jail guards were making plumbing repairs. Three inmates were recaptured within one day after the escape, and a fourth was caught on August 28. Larry McClendon Jr., who had been charged with shooting a store clerk to death and was considered one of the most dangerous escapees, was captured in Texas on October 4; his childhood friend Michael England, was captured nine days later. One inmate, Edward Salas, was captured in October 2012. He had been convicted of murdering a 10-year-old boy.

At least four inmates who did not escape were charged with assisting in the jailbreak by attempting to block the escaping inmates from surveillance cameras; authorities said additional inmates may also be charged. Since the prisoners had access to cell doors that were supposed to be locked, investigators were looking into whether the inmates had any assistance from jail staff. Several family members were charged with failing to cooperate with the investigation. Security measures have been revised as a result of the jailbreak and an independent investigation at the facility was conducted. Authorities have cited a long-standing disregard for proper policies and procedures in contributing to the escape, but they do not believe any jail staff deliberately assisted in the escape. The jail break was featured on a September 6 episode of America's Most Wanted. Many at the time noted the similarities in the escape with the hit TV series Prison Break.

== Jail break ==
=== Escape ===
Eight inmates escaped from the Curry County Adult Detention Center in Clovis on August 24, 2008, by cutting a hole in the roof and leaping off the building. The inmates were:

- Victor Apodaca, 39, who pleaded guilty to kidnapping, aggravated battery and drug trafficking.
- Louis Chavez, 18, who had been charged with aggravated burglary, tampering with evidence and extreme cruelty to animals.
- Michael England, 29, who was awaiting trial on tampering with evidence and felony firearm possession, in connection with McClendon's alleged murder.
- Raynaldo Jeremy Enriquez, 19, who was indicted for burglary and assault charges.
- Larry McClendon Jr., 19, who was charged with shooting a store clerk to death.
- Edward Salas, 21, who was serving a life sentence in prison for the murder of a 10-year-old boy.
- Victor Sotelo, 26, who was awaiting trial on aggravated assault charges for an alleged stabbing.
- Javier Zapata, 19, was charged with aggravated assault and child abuse for allegedly shooting at his wife while her five children were nearby.

The location of Clovis, New Mexico.

The escape was believed to be the culmination of several days of planning. About one week before the escape, one or more of the inmates stole a cellular phone that a nurse left on a computer table in the infirmary. Although she canceled the service immediately upon discovering it was missing, the inmates made several calls before it was disconnected, most of which between 2 p.m. and 3 p.m. on August 18. Lolo Salas, father of inmate Edward Salas, was among those called by the inmates. The phone was used by multiple inmates, including some who did not escape. Authorities would later say they believed the calls were used to coordinate parts of the escape.

According to a later investigation, the inmates likely stole a key that was left hanging in the door lock of a plumbing chase while guards were making plumbing repairs, including fixing a clogged toilet. Inmates Salas, Enriquez and Chavez shared a pod on a second floor balcony, while the other five men occupied a pod on the ground floor underneath them. The inmates used the stolen key to unlock a rarely used door between the two pods, and slipped the key under the door of a neighboring pod. Those inmates unlocked their own pod door and the small door of a plumbing chute, a narrow space behind a common wall of the pods that contained plumbing pipes which led to the roof. The key was then returned to the original lock without the knowledge of the guards. Over the course of the 48 hours leading up to the escape, the inmates regularly traveled back and forth between the two pods to socialize and receive tattoos.

On August 24, the eight men slipped one at a time into a small door that led to the plumbing chute with the intention of climbing the pipes to the roof area. At least four inmates who did not escape the jail assisted the eight men in their plan, including Lawrence Kolek, 26; Manuel Lopez, 32; Kevyn Crane, 26; Donald Jones, 27, police allege. Surveillance camera footage revealed the four men allegedly taking turns attempting to block Salas, Enriquez and Chavez from the view of the cameras as they entered the chute. At one point, two of them stood next to each other in an attempt to conceal the escaping inmates, with one stretching his arms out in a feigned yawn; in another instance, a man held a large blanket behind his shoulders like a cape. No surveillance cameras monitored the lower pod or the roof. The surveillance footage of the upper pod spanned from 5 p.m. to 9:45 p.m. One of the three men was also observed carrying a white bag into the chute. At least two inmates not involved in the escape said they heard banging noises, but dismissed it because they believed it was construction work being done elsewhere in the building.

Once the escaping inmates climbed to the top of the pipe, they used handmade instruments to cut a hole near a skylight. It took about seven hours to cut through the jail's roof. Investigators believe the tools were fashioned from scraps of metal they found in the plumbing chase that was left behind from previous repair work. Enriquez later told police he was the one who literally cut the hole. Once they were through, some of the inmates used an evergreen near the building to break their falls as they leapt to street level. Authorities believe most of the men split up early and went different ways because discarded jail jumpsuits were found at various locations throughout Clovis. Police, however, speculated that McClendon and England stayed together due to their prior childhood associations.

=== Four inmates arrested ===
The jailbreak was first discovered by Stephen Borders, a patrol officer with the Clovis Police Department, who spotted two Hispanic males walking casually on 12th Street, two blocks from the jail, wearing orange pants and white tank top T-shirts. Borders recognized the clothing as normal jail garments and turned a spotlight on the men, who reacted with surprise. As Borders turned to drive in their direction, they disappeared into an alley. Borders called to find out if any inmates were missing, then pursued two inmates. Three minutes later, another officer subdued one of them. Dispatch had not yet responded to Borders' inquiry about missing inmates, so he arrested the suspect, later identified as Victor Apodaca, for failing to identify himself when asked for a name. The other inmate escaped.

Two more inmates were captured on Monday, August 25 as the result of tips from the public. Enriquez was found and arrested without incident in Lubbock, a Texas city about 100 miles from Clovis. Javier Zapata was captured by federal marshals late around 11:30 p.m. in Cactus, Texas, about 165 miles from Clovis. The five inmates remaining at large were considered very dangerous because all had been charged with violent crimes, but authorities did not know whether they had any weapons. Charges related to the escape were also filed against all eight inmates. Police said they were following several tips and leads, and motorists were stopped and questioned at roadblocks on the outskirts of Clovis.

Federal agencies, including the United States Marshals Service, joined the investigation along with state police and the sheriff's department. Officials believed some of the at-large escapees could have been in West Texas and the Lubbock area, and began to focus their searches in and around Clovis, Albuquerque and Amarillo, Texas. Federal marshals started conducting sweeps of areas the escapees were known to frequent, and began looking into families and friends of the inmates. Melody Carter, McClendon's mother, said marshals searched her house and told her they did not know the escapees' state of mind, so might have to use deadly force when they find them. She told reporters, "They did inform me to be ready just in case they might have to bring him in in a body bag." Carter said she was surprised her son would flee from jail because she thought his innocence could be proved at trial, and made a public plea to the press: "I love you and I couldn't stand to lose you. Please turn yourself in."

Information gathered in Curry County led Albuquerque police to find the location of a fourth inmate, Victor Sotelo. Sotelo was arrested without incident August 28 at about 11:45 p.m. in an Ortiz Drive duplex. Investigators traveled to Albuquerque the next day to interview him, then returned him to the Curry County Adult Detention Center along with the three other captured inmates. All four men were placed in 24-hour isolation. Authorities did not disclose whether Sotelo provided any information of value to the investigation. Investigators said they were expanding the scope of their previous searches, and were optimistic of the direction of the search; Curry County Undersheriff Wesley Waller said, "We're four down, four to go. ... The investigation is going well."

=== Additional arrests ===
Authorities determined the escape plan was too elaborate for the inmates to have carried it out by themselves and felt it would require help from both inside and outside the jail. Investigators began looking into both the inmates and whether any jail staff had a hand in the escapes; in particular, investigations focused on how the inmates gained access to the locked pod doors. Based on surveillance footage of the second floor pod, police charged Kolek, Lopez, Crane and Jones with three counts each of assisting escape and three counts each of harboring or aiding a felon for their alleged assistance in the escape. Police said they expected additional arrests as the investigation continues.

District Attorney Matthew Chandler stressed anyone assisting the fugitives would face criminal charges: "They're receiving some type of assistance. We want to make it loud and clear today that anyone that assists these fugitives will be held accountable." Isodoro "Lolo" Salas, father of fugitive Edward Salas, was arrested after authorities said he refused to cooperate with investigators; Isodoro, an Albuquerque resident, was charged with obstruction of justice, a probation violation and resisting or obstruction of an officer. Asha Currey, of Clovis, the mother of escapee Michael England's child, was also arrested.

Sometime after the jailbreak, England's eight-year-old son told his elementary school guidance counselor he had seen his father at his aunt's house. The boy was interviewed by child forensic specialists, and told them he saw both England and McClendon speak to his grandmother, Hester England, and that England asked him to hand over a Wal-Mart bag so he could pack some clothes. During an initial August 25 interview with Hester England, the Clovis resident denied knowing anything about the escape or the whereabouts of any escapees. She was interviewed again on August 27 and repeated the claims, and even said she would go to the news to ask her son to contact her. She did so, telling the media, "This is involving our whole family. Please turn yourself in. I'll be there for you no matter what. Call me night and day, I'm there for you."

After her media statement, Hester England was interviewed again and told of her grandson's confession. She then confessed that she previously lied to officers and had in fact seen the two men. Hester claimed she heard Asha Currey talking with two men outside Hester's home, and said she came outside to find England and McClendon. Hester said she knew they escaped from jail because "it was obvious." She claimed she told them to turn themselves in, but England said he was not going back to jail. He gathered clothes from the house and left. Hester said she did not tell police because she loved her son, but admitted she should have told them about McClendon, whom she knew was charged with murder.

On August 28, England was arrested on charges of harboring or aiding a felon and obstructing an officer, and was released on a $6,000 bond. Hester England and Asha Currey both faced up to 12 years in prison. Tiffany Wallace, McClendon's 18-year-old girlfriend, said she had a dresser drawer full of McClendon's clothing in her bedroom, but that it was gone now. She expects McClendon took them, but she denied having seen him. Wallace was not charged with any crimes.

=== America's Most Wanted ===
Producers of the hit Fox show America's Most Wanted contacted Curry County authorities with plans to feature the eight inmates in an August 20 program. Undersheriff Waller said he expected the show to be "a tremendous help (because) it always generates new tips and new information." District Attorney Chandler, however, added, "Our goal is to have the show cancelled because we've caught them." The show was later rescheduled to early September because the producers decided to make it a bigger production than initially planned.

An in-depth segment aired September 6 focusing on the escape and the four inmates at large, particularly focusing on Salas and his role in the 2005 shooting death of 10-year-old Carlos Perez. Show producer Jenna Naranjo said, "He's been convicted, he's a killer, he's the most dangerous and he has nothing to lose." Noe Torres, a fugitive also charged with the Perez shooting, was also featured briefly in the segment. A Clovis police detective was flown to the East Coast studio so he could be on-hand to take any tips or calls resulting from the broadcast. Undersheriff Waller said several promising leads generated from the show, but declined to discuss them publicly.

On September 5, Curry County officials increased the reward information leading to the arrests of Salas and McClendon to $5,000, up from the original $3,000 and $2,500, respectively. Reward amounts of $1,500 for England and $1,000 for Chavez were kept in place. A Major Crimes Unit of local police, state police and federal marshals continued running a 24-hour command center into September responding to dozens of tips and calls, many of which they admitted were not fruitful. Patrols were also increased in the Curry County area, state police provided reinforcements from Quay and De Baca counties, and border patrol at the Mexico–United States border was on "high alert" for the fugitives.

On September 24, 2008, District Attorney Matt Chandler said investigators were following up on “credible tips” that have placed two of the four remaining jail escapees in Amarillo and Plainview, Texas, and Clovis. Investigators believe England has been traveling back and forth between the Amarillo area and Clovis, and was spotted in Clovis and Amarillo in the last week, according to phone tips. Murder suspect Larry McClendon, has been in the Amarillo and Plainview areas where he has family, Chandler said. Investigators have information placing the other two jail fugitives, Edward Salas and Louis Chavez, in Albuquerque since the August 24th escape. Salas and Chavez were overheard before the escape talking about going to Albuquerque together, according to an investigative report from the district attorney's office released Tuesday. Undersheriff Wesley Waller said information received on Salas has pointed to several western states, including California, in addition to Albuquerque, where his parents live.

=== Three more captures ===
Larry McClendon Jr. was arrested October 4 near a West 5th Street apartment complex in Amarillo, Texas. McClendon attempted to flee on foot when he first saw the Amarillo Police Department SWAT officers, but was caught after a brief pursuit that ended in the parking lot of an Ashley Furniture store. Nobody was injured in the chase. Authorities credited a tip received through America's Most Wanted, but McClendon's mother, Melody Carter, said she had also called U.S. marshals and told them he was in the Amarillo area. Carter spoke to her son via phone October 3, when he called her to ask for medication he needed and told her he would come to pick it up on Monday. Carter, who said she cooperated with authorities so that her son would not be injured during his capture, told the press, "He was on the verge of turning himself in. ... He was exhausted and he was tired and he didn't want to go through this no more." McClendon waived his extradition on October 7 and was to be transferred back to Clovis to face charges.

Authorities learned McClendon and Michael England had been travelling together and wearing women's attire as a disguise. Shortly after McClendon's capture, England contacted Clovis investigators through an attorney and attempted to negotiate a conditional surrender. He asked police to drop charges against his mother, Hester England, who was arrested after she lied to police about having seen her son after the escape; England also demanded two drug trafficking charges against his brother be dropped and that police return $3,000 seized by police during his brother's arrest, which England planned to use for legal fees. District Attorney Chandler said authorities believed England was in Clovis or the surrounding area and would continue searching for him, but they were not interested in making such a deal with him.

England was captured without incident on October 13 around 11:30 a.m. after a tip led Clovis police to an apartment complex in the 500 block of Pile Street. Three additional people were arrested at the apartment for helping to hide England: Asha Curry, 27; Robin Kirven, 37 and Samantha Wallace, 19. All three were charged with harboring and aiding a fugitive and were held on $5,000 bonds.

On December 8, a customer at the Lowe's grocery store in Clovis spotted who they believed to be Louis Chavez in the store and notified police. As police officers pulled into the store's parking lot, they saw Chavez and another male enter a vehicle. They approached the vehicle and found Chavez trying to hide on the floorboard. Although he gave officers a false name, they quickly identified Chavez based on his tattoos and other physical characteristics and arrested him.

During questioning, Chavez told police he had been hiding in Texas for some time and had returned to Clovis only a few hours before his capture, although police believe he had returned to the city about a week prior. Chavez claimed he and the other escapees went their separate ways after the escape and that he did not know the location of Edward Salas, the remaining escapee. But investigators said they had information that contradicted those statements, including evidence that Chavez and Salas were together for at least some time after the escape. Police charged Anthony Lanaro, 24, the male driver of the vehicle with aiding and abetting a felon, but the driver claimed he did not personally know Chavez and was only giving him a ride after having picked him up recently in Clovis.

=== Final capture ===
One inmate, Edward Salas, remained at large long after the jail break. On December 19, 2011, he was placed on the U.S. Marshals 15 Most Wanted List. He was captured in Chihuahua, Chihuahua, Mexico on October 4, 2012, and was extradited back to New Mexico in 2014. He had been working as an assassin for the Zetas cartel.

== Security responses and prosecutions ==
=== Immediate security responses ===
The Curry County Adult Detention Center contained 188 inmates at the time of the jailbreak, including 141 males and 47 females. County Manager Lance Pyle said he had known since early 2008 that video surveillance at the jail was in need of repairs and revamping. At the time of the jailbreak there were 24 cameras at the facility, three of which outside. Pyle said footage was only stored for a few days, visibility was poor, blind spots exist and additional cameras were needed. On August 27, Curry County commissioners approved a bid for a $166,000 system that would increase the number of cameras to 76, with 13 more outside. A jail management board was implemented to oversee the facility and sheriff department officials were temporarily reassigned to assist jail administrators with facility management. Visiting privileges for all inmates were suspended after the escape, but were reinstated in early September. Educational programs, along with religious and library services, were suspended in light of the escape because officials said prisoners could smuggle contraband and manipulate teachers. The programs were already under review prior to the escape, but jail officials said they would still eventually be reinstated because they were believed to curb recidivism.

County commissioners began seeking an architect to review other changes at the jail after the escape. Officials said there was a need for additional security doors and were several issues with the existing doors, intercom systems and the control board that operates doors. Officials said inmates regularly found creative ways to keep their cell doors from being closed, including using dominoes and wet toilet paper. Doors that had been removed from the women's annex cells in 2007 were reinstalled in September, and additional security and officials were installed to watch the female inmates. Officials also installed iron bars and a locked door as a boundary between detention officers and inmates, in place of what used to be a simple line on the floor. Eight new officers were hired by October and officials said the training process for new guards was improved. Officer stations were designed to allow 360-degree visibility of the pods and windows were covered with one-way tint so the prisoners could not see outside. Routine searches by drug-sniffing dogs were also implemented at the jail.

=== Independent investigation of the jail ===
As of mid-September, police, jail and county officials had failed to address why detention officers were not aware of the escape even though it took about seven hours to complete. No detention center employees have been disciplined, fired, placed on leave or resigned. An independent assessment of the detention center by the New Mexico Association of Counties was ordered in response to the escape, and District Attorney Chandler said one of the driving factors would be whether any jail employees were criminally liable. Chandler assured the public any uncovered criminal activity would result in charges: “I am pretty bothered by the fact that these guys we caught the first time are out, that our victims can’t sleep comfortably and that the community (has had to be on alert)."

A preliminary assessment was provided to the county commissioners at their September 3 meeting, but although they spent more than two-and-a-half hours discussing them in a closed executive session with consultants, they declined to discuss them with the public or the press. County Manager Lance Pyle said he would not discuss any preliminary findings, but would make public any policies or procedures that are changed or items that require monetary commitment. The Clovis News Journal submitted a formal public information request for the assessment, but county officials denied in on September 9, claiming the assessment was provided to the county attorney, and that attorney–client privilege exempted it from the Public Records Act. Leonard DeLayo, executive director of the New Mexico Foundation for Open Government," said the county was "off base" and the refusal to hand over the document "is a serious violation of the spirit and intent of open government."

Pyle said detention experts and state police were assessing the jail and an action plan would be put into place after the assessment was completed. Although Chandler declined to identify specifics of the preliminary assessment, he said it provided some new insights, including how the inmates were able to move freely between two pods for up to 48 hours before the escape. However, he also said it left other questions unanswered, including how the inmates obtained the instruments to cut the hole in the roof. Members of the region's Major Crimes Unit were asked to reinterview inmates and detention officers in response to those unanswered questions. As of October, county officials continued to decline publicly commenting on the assessment, citing personnel issues.

Dan Aguilar, a special agent with Chandler's office compiled an investigative report in late September which indicated the inmates stole a key that guards left hanging in a door lock while making plumbing repairs. The detention officers interviewed did not know if the key was left in the door, but at least one said it was possible. Chandler blamed the escape on "complacency" and "a failure to pay attention to detail." The report found pod checks scheduled every hour were not completed during the weekend leading up to the escape due to staffing shortages. It also found guards rarely entered the pods where prisoners were housed, and cell doors within the pods designed to be locked down at night did not work for several months, allowing inmates free run of the pods. Chandler said he hopes to see the jail's issues corrected, and said procedures and policies that should have been followed "have been thrown to the wind for quite some time."

Chandler said the report did not find that the inmates received intentional help from jail staff, but an inmate told New Mexico State Police in a separate investigative report that at least one guard had assisted in the escape. Chandler, however, maintained all other interviews and evidence indicated the contrary, and said the inmate who made the accusation had a "history of conflict" with the guard. A separate investigative report in early October revealed the inmates stole a cellular phone from a nurse in the jail's infirmary and used it to place several calls in the week before the escape. Unlike phone calls made from the jail's land lines, the cellular phone conversations were not recorded. Although authorities said they strongly believe some of the calls involved planning the escape, they were unable to determine the exact nature of the calls. The phone was later found in the possession of an inmate who did not escape.

=== Criminal charges ===
On September 25, 2008, Javier Zapata and Enriquez were each charged with escape from jail, conspiracy to escape from jail and criminal damage to property over $1,000. Enriquez was committed to prison in lieu of $125,000 cash-only bail due to his history of violent crimes, and faces more than four additional years in prison for his role in the escape. Zapata pleaded guilty and was sentenced to 18 additional months in prison on March 3, 2009, but the sentence was suspended on March 22.

Lawrence Kolek, Manuel Lopez and Kevyn Crane were also arraigned on September 25 for their alleged roles in helping the inmates escape. The three men face a possible nine years in prison; authorities said the penalty is steep because one of the escapees, Salas, was a convicted murderer. Bonds for Lopez and Kolek were set at $25,000 cash-only, and $15,000 cash-only for Crane.

On January 14, 2009, Victor Apodaca pleaded guilty to one count of escape from custody. He was sentenced to two-and-a-half more years in prison, which will commence following the completion of his existing 15-year sentence on unrelated charges. Apodaca was sentenced as a habitual offender.

In January 2009, District Attorney Matt Chandler also charged Velma Valdez, 44, and Abundio Valdez, 34, with two counts each of harboring a felon. Chandler said upon arresting Luiz Chavez, authorities learned Chavez and Edward Salas were transported to Friona in West Texas in the trunk of Abundio Valdez, who along with Velma gave them supplies shortly after their escape. Velma Valdez was related to Salas by marriage. The car took back roads during the escape to avoid roadblocks set by police. Abundio pleaded guilty and was sentenced to 15 years in prison on May 7, 2009.

Ninth Judicial District Attorney Matthew Chandler announced August 3, 2009 that Robin Kirven, age 40, and Samantha Wallace, age 21, was convicted of Harboring a Felon. The incident stems from August 24, 2008, when Michael England, along with seven other jail inmates escaped from the Curry County Detention Center. England was awaiting trial for Tampering with Evidence in a murder investigation when he escaped from jail. Michael England was apprehended by local authorities on October 13, 2008, after Clovis Police Department received a Crime Stoppers Tip stating that England was at the apartment of Samantha Wallace. Officers responded to the call and at the apartment, spoke with Robin Kirven and Samantha Wallace, who both denied that England was at the residence. After a thorough search was conducted of the apartment, authorities found England hiding between a bed and wall in a back bedroom. Michael England was apprehended and both women were charged with Harboring a Felon. The Honorable Robert Orlik presided over the sentencing and Chief Deputy District Attorney Andrea Reeb prosecuted the case for the State. At sentencing, the Court ordered that Robin Kirven and Samantha Wallace serve one year in the Curry County Adult Detention Center, followed by six months of intensively supervised parole.
