= Fox Lake Grade School District 114 =

School district in Illinois, United States

Address
- 29067 West Grass Lake Road Spring Grove, Illinois, 60081; United States

District information
- Grades: Preschool-8
- Superintendent: Heather Friziellie
- Schools: Lotus Elementary School; Stanton Middle School

Other information
- Website: Official website

Fox Lake Grade School District 114 is an elementary school district based in unincorporated Lake County, Illinois, east of the village of Spring Grove, and educates students in the northwestern region of Lake County. The communities served by the school district surround Fox Lake. The district is composed of two schools, with one being an elementary school and the other being a middle school.

== Schools ==
District students begin their education at Lotus School, which is located in unincorporated Spring Grove, in Lake County. Lotus school students range from PreK through fourth grade under principal Matt Peters.

Graduates of Lotus attend Stanton School, which is located in the Lake County portion of the village of Fox Lake; and attends to students between grades fifth and eight under supervision of principal Jeff Sefcik. The district superintendent is Heather Friziellie.
