= Suicide of Joe Gliniewicz =

Staged suicide of an American police officer

Joe Gliniewicz
- Born: Charles Joseph Gliniewicz; August 25, 1963; Libertyville, Illinois, U.S.
- Died: September 1, 2015 (aged 52); Fox Lake, Illinois, U.S.
- Cause of death: Self-inflicted gunshot wounds
- Burial place: Hillside East Cemetery; Antioch, Illinois, U.S. 42°28′49″N 88°03′56″W
- Other name: "G.I. Joe"
- Education: Kaplan University
- Occupation: Police officer
- Years active: 1985–2015
- Employer: Fox Lake Police Department
- Spouse: Melodie Gliniewicz née Resetar (m. 1989)
- Children: 4
- Military career
- Allegiance: United States
- Branch: United States Army
- Service years: 1981–2007
- Rank: First sergeant
- Awards: Air Assault Badge; Drill Sergeant Badge; Meritorious Service Medal; Army Commendation Medal; Humanitarian Service Medal

On September 1, 2015, American police lieutenant Charles Joseph "Joe" Gliniewicz was found deceased in a marsh in Fox Lake, Illinois. The incident gained national coverage as it was initially believed that Gliniewicz was murdered by three unknown assailants. However, after two months of investigation, officials of the Lake County Major Crime Task Force concluded that Gliniewicz had actually committed suicide that he staged to look like murder, after realizing that his many years of criminal activity would soon be exposed.

== Background ==
Joe Gliniewicz was born in Libertyville, Illinois. He attended Marmion Military Academy and graduated from Antioch Community High School in Antioch in 1981 before enlisting in the United States Army. He was trained as a military police officer, drill sergeant, sniper, and in airborne assault.

In 1985, he joined the Fox Lake Police Department (FLPD), the primary law enforcement agency for Fox Lake, Illinois, a village of about 10,000 that is approximately 60 miles north of Chicago. He was assigned as a patrol officer and received further training and certifications in special assignments including SWAT, police dog handling, and became a certified evidence technician. In 1996, he was promoted to sergeant and then lieutenant in 2006. Gliniewicz was in command of the Fox Lake Police Explorer program Post 300, an organization mentoring adolescents interested in law enforcement careers.

At the time of his death he was scheduled to retire in approximately one month after a nearly thirty year career. He previously obtained a master's degree from Kaplan University and remained in the United States Army Reserve from 1981 until 2007, separating with the rank of first sergeant. He gained the nickname "G.I. Joe" due to his military background and perceived physical resemblance to the action figure character of the same name. At the time of his death he resided in Antioch with his wife of 26 years, Melodie, and their four sons.

== Incident ==
At 7:52 a.m. on September 1, 2015, Gliniewicz radioed to dispatch that he was pursuing three men, described as two white and one black, at an abandoned cement plant in Fox Lake. At 8:09 a.m., FLPD officers responding to his request for backup discovered his deceased body in a wooded marsh about 50 yards from his vehicle. According to reports, the first bullet from his .40 caliber semi-automatic handgun had struck his mobile phone and ballistic vest while the second pierced his upper chest. His head was scraped and bruised. The swampy terrain was otherwise undisturbed, and his handgun was not found for more than an hour, despite it being less than one yard from his body. Other pieces of his police equipment, including his radio, taser, and pepper spray, were found scattered nearby in the marsh as well.

== Manhunt ==
A massive manhunt was launched for these three male suspects, involving some 400 law enforcement officers on foot, via vehicles, helicopters, drones, and on horseback. Local law enforcement were also assisted by federal agencies including the ATF, FBI, and the US Marshals Service.

On the evening of September 2, a 30-year-old woman named Kristin Kiefer of Vernon Hills, Illinois contacted police to report that while she was pulled over on the side of the road in Volo, Illinois, two men, one white and one black, approached her from a cornfield and tried to steal her car prompting her to flee from them on foot. Nearly 100 state and local law enforcement authorities set up roadblocks and searched the area along with 11 police K-9 and three air units from around 9:30 p.m. Wednesday until around 2:30 a.m. Thursday. The search took officers through the dense Volo Bog State Natural Area after canines mistakenly tracked a deer. Kiefer later admitted to fabricating the entire story and she was arrested and charged with two counts of disorderly conduct for falsifying a police report. In May 2017, she was convicted, placed on probation, and ordered to pay $20,000 in restitution.

== Reaction ==
A large crowd gathered at a vigil on September 2 at the Lakefront Park in Fox Lake. His wife and sons spoke to the crowd. On September 3, the Chicago Bears displayed a tribute to Gliniewicz during a preseason game. Thousands of people, including hundreds of law enforcement officers and officials from around the country, attended the funeral in Antioch on September 7. His funeral procession from Antioch High School to Fox Lake and back, was 18 miles in length. Thousands of people took to the streets to view the procession and show their support, many of them waving Thin Blue Line and U.S. flags. Then-Illinois Governor Bruce Rauner, who attended the funeral, ordered flags to be flown half-staff. Many early reactions blamed Gliniewicz's death on a "war on cops" and the Black Lives Matter movement, which had become prevalent the previous year during the Ferguson unrest.

In the weeks following the incident, Joseph Battaglia, a former Chicago police officer, began calling police agencies and media outlets insisting that Gliniewicz had shot himself intentionally. On September 13, Battaglia was charged with disorderly conduct after threatening officials for not declaring Gliniewicz' death a suicide. Battaglia was later sentenced to one year of supervision after pleading guilty.

== Investigation ==
The investigation concluded in November 2015 that Gliniewicz had been embezzling money for at least seven years from the police explorer program, that he believed that his crimes were about to be exposed, and that his death had been a "carefully staged suicide." He had also tried to induce a high-ranking member of an outlaw motorcycle gang to kill village administrator Anne Marrin, who was conducting a financial audit of the program. Additionally, an unmarked bag of cocaine was discovered in his desk, and text messages during the investigation revealed he was considering planting incriminating evidence on Marrin.

Further incidents involving Gliniewicz were also uncovered including him threatening an emergency dispatcher with a firearm, allegations of sexual harassment, alcohol abuse and numerous suspensions. Over 6,500 deleted text messages were also recovered detailing some of his criminal activities, including his desire to "take out" the village administrator. Financial statements were also discovered revealing that he had embezzled a five-figure sum from the explorer program and spent it on things such as vacations, mortgage payments, gym memberships and pornography. Investigators also discovered large stockpiles of military surplus gear in his police explorer headquarters such as kevlar helmets, radios, ballistic vests, combat boots, gas masks and gun belts by the hundreds. Authorities stated it would have been impossible for Gliniewicz to provide documentation for these items because he had been obtaining the gear through fraud and that these surplus items are meant for use by actual police officers, not explorers. The Fox Lake Police Explorer Post 300 was disbanded following the incident.

== Aftermath ==
Once news of this betrayal came to light, numerous organizations that had raised or donated money for the Gliniewicz family demanded it be returned. Tributes and memorials were quickly removed and the largest, which had been constructed in front of the Fox Lake Police Department, was altered, with a memorial sign using his nickname "G.I. Joe", now labeling him as "G.I. Joke". The Washington D.C.-based Law Enforcement Officers Memorial Fund said Gliniewicz's name would no longer be etched onto a marble monument dedicated to deceased officers, and his Officer Down Memorial Page webpage was taken down. Gliniewicz quickly went from "hero to criminal".

On January 27, 2016, Gliniewicz's wife, Melodie, was indicted on four counts of disbursing charitable funds without authority and for personal benefit, and two counts of money laundering; she pleaded not guilty to these charges. On February 2, 2016, authorities seized five bank accounts believed to be derived from embezzled funds. In June 2020, a judge ordered the text messages exchanged between Melodie and her late husband to be admissible evidence. On February 18, 2022, Melodie accepted a plea deal, being convicted of deceptive practice, a Class 4 felony in Illinois. The remainder of her charges were dismissed and on April 12, 2022, she was sentenced to two years of probation. On April 10, 2025, Fox Lake agreed to a $1,000,000 settlement with Melodie, who had sued the village over her late husband's withheld pension.

His son, Donald "D.J." Gliniewicz, was also under investigation after a series of texts were found between Gliniewicz and his son about loans and how he could evade discovery of unidentified expenses; however, the case was closed as investigators could not prove the son had prior knowledge that money from his father came from the youth program's account.

Just the first three weeks of the investigation cost taxpayers in 50 suburban jurisdictions more than $300,000 to pay local law enforcement personnel working on the case, according to the Daily Herald. Nearly two-thirds of the cost, $196,351, were related to overtime, including pay for some officers attending Gliniewicz's funeral on Labor Day.
