= Potkrajci, Bijelo Polje =

Potkrajci Поткрајци
- Town
- Location within Montenegro
- Country: Montenegro
- Municipality: Bijelo Polje

Population (2011)
  - Total: 1,066
- Time zone: UTC+1 (CET)
  - Summer (DST): UTC+2 (CEST)

Potkrajci (Montenegrin Cyrillic: Поткрајци) is a village in the municipality of Bijelo Polje, Montenegro.

== Demographics ==
According to the 2003 census, the town had a population of 1,915 people.

According to the 2011 census, its population was 1,066.

Ethnicity in 2011
Ethnicity	Number	Percentage
Bosniaks	556	52.2%
Serbs	237	22.2%
Montenegrins	67	6.3%
Roma	38	3.6%
other/undeclared	168	15.8%
Total	1,066	100%
