= New Mexico Association of Counties =

Non-partisan association

The New Mexico Association of Counties is a non-partisan association representing public employees and elected officials working at the county level of government in the U.S. state of New Mexico. Founded in 1968, the organization is headquartered in Santa Fe, New Mexico. It is the New Mexico chapter of the National Association of Counties. As of 2014, the president of the New Mexico Association of Counties is Wendell Bostwick, a commissioner of Curry County. Its vice-president is Los Alamos County clerk Sharon Stover.
