= Los Angeles airport shooting =

Los Angeles airport shooting may refer to:

- 2002 Los Angeles International Airport shooting, which killed two people
- 2013 Los Angeles International Airport shooting, which killed a TSA officer
