= Fox Lake, Illinois =

- Village
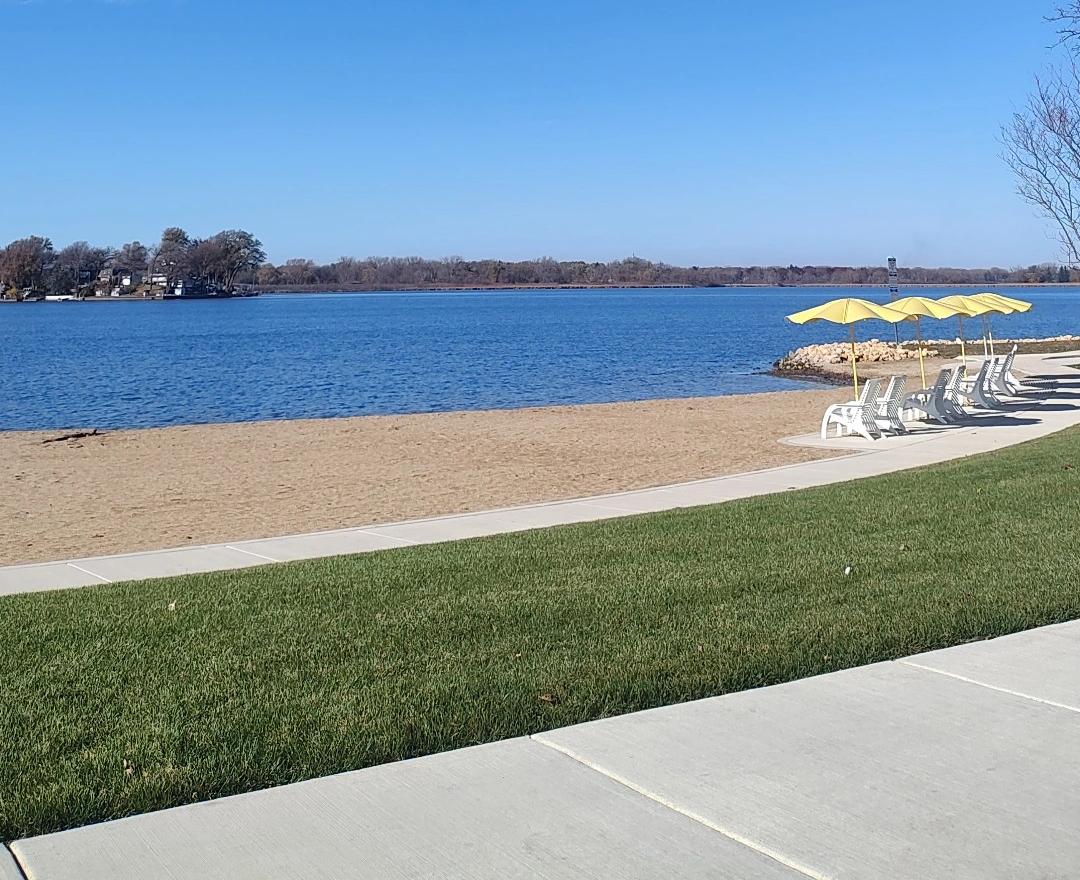
- Fox Lake Shoreline, 2024

- Seal
- Motto(s): "Anchoring Tradition, Linking the Future"
- Location of Fox Lake in Lake County, Illinois.
- Coordinates: 42°23′02″N 88°10′28″W
- Country: United States
- State: Illinois
- Counties: Lake, McHenry
- Townships: Grant, Antioch, Burton
- Incorporated: April 13, 1907

Area
  - Total: 9.44 sq mi (24.44 km^{2})
  - Land: 7.83 sq mi (20.29 km^{2})
  - Water: 1.60 sq mi (4.15 km^{2})
- Elevation: 748 ft (228 m)

Population (2020)
  - Total: 10,978
  - Density: 1,401.5/sq mi (541.13/km^{2})
- Time zone: UTC-6 (CST)
  - Summer (DST): UTC-5 (CDT)
- ZIP code: 60020
- Area codes: 847 & 224
- FIPS code: 17-27442
- GNIS feature ID: 2398912
- Website: www.foxlake.org

Fox Lake is a village in Lake County, Illinois and Burton Township, McHenry County, Illinois, United States. Fox Lake is a northwestern Chicago suburb. The population was 10,978 at the 2020 census. It is located 50 miles north of Chicago.

== History ==
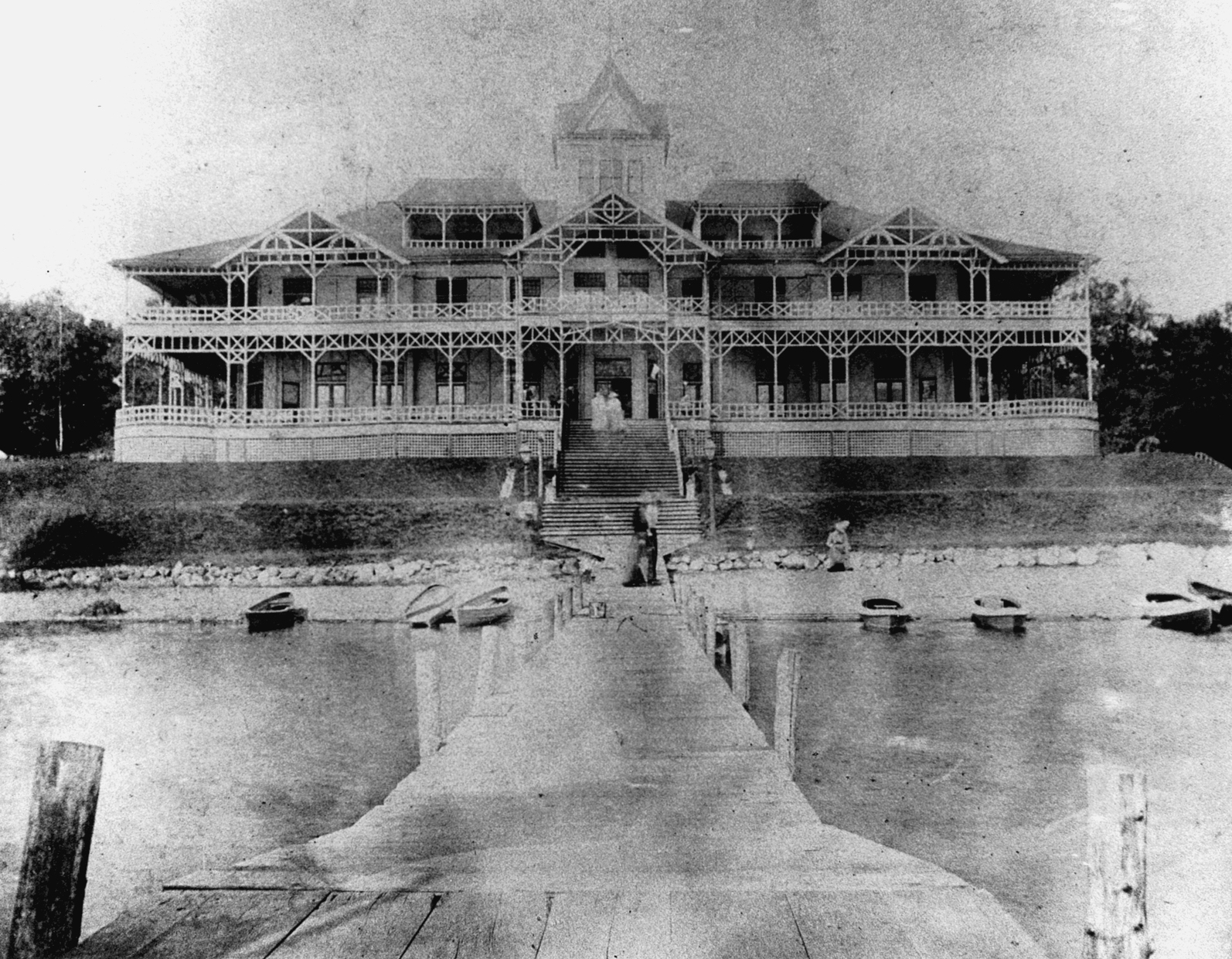
The original Mineola Hotel

The village was incorporated on December 15, 1906, and certified by the state on April 13, 1907. The area was first explored during the 17th century by the French. In the late 19th century, it was known as Nippersink Point. Early in the 20th century, there were but a few hundred residents. During the summer season, however, the population would reach an estimated 20,000 people, and at its peak, the area had 50 hotels and 2,000 cottages. Infamous Chicago gangster Al Capone is reported to have utilized an establishment now known as the Mineola Hotel and Restaurant as a hideout, although this has never been documented. Fox Lake is known to still have ties to mob activity. In 1979, the Mineola was listed on the National Register of Historic Places and may be the largest wooden frame structure in the state.

Many Chicagoans have established summer homes in Fox Lake. The village is situated among the Chain O'Lakes, where swimming, boating, jet skiing, tubing and boarding are popular activities. In 2006, there were an estimated 28,000 boats registered on the lake system.

Boating accidents are prevalent in today's society, however, number of accidents on Fox Lake have decreased in part to stricter regulations on boating under the influence of alcohol and other factors. Fiscal year 2010 had only one accident and death by boat. That number rose in 2015 to 3 accidents, 1 injury and 1 death. The two fatalities in 2015 were caused by drowning due to alcohol use.

In 2010, the new library opened next to the old library building. The new facility included expanded Adult and Youth Departments, a large public computer area, quiet study and reading rooms, and a Young Adult area.

Fox Lake came under the national spotlight in September 2015 when Joe Gliniewicz of the Fox Lake Police Department was found deceased in a marsh via gunshot wounds after radioing that he was pursuing three subjects. The subsequent manhunt for the alleged shooters employed over 400 law enforcement personnel, impacted the entire local community, and sparked a debate in the media regarding the "War on Cops" and the Black Lives Matter movement. Thousands of people, including then-Governor Bruce Rauner, gathered for a funeral and memorial procession to show their support. After a two-month investigation, authorities concluded that Gliniewicz committed "a carefully staged suicide". It was learned that he had been involved in financial malfeasance related to his job as the head of the local Police Explorers program and had even attempted to hire a gang member to kill the village administrator who he was concerned would discover his crimes during her financial audit of the program.

== Geography ==
Fox Lake is located 55 miles (89 km) northwest of downtown Chicago and 20 miles (32 km) west of Waukegan, Illinois. The village center is located on the east shore of Pistakee Lake, and south shore of Nippersink Lake and Fox Lake, three connected water bodies that form part of the Chain O'Lakes system, flowing southwest via the Fox River to the Illinois River. The village limits extend north in a sinuous manner all the way to the Wisconsin border.

According to the 2021 census gazetteer files, Fox Lake has a total area of 9.44 square miles (24.45 km^{2}), of which 7.83 square miles (20.28 km^{2}) (or 83.01%) is land and 1.60 square miles (4.14 km^{2}) (or 16.99%) is water.

== Demographics ==
Historical population
Census	Pop.	Note	%±
1910	400		—
1920	467		16.8%
1930	880		88.4%
1940	110		−87.5%
1950	2,238		1,934.5%
1960	3,700		65.3%
1970	4,511		21.9%
1980	6,831		51.4%
1990	7,478		9.5%
2000	9,178		22.7%
2010	10,579		15.3%
2020	10,978		3.8%
U.S. Decennial Census; 2010 2020

=== Racial and ethnic composition ===
Fox Lake village, Illinois – Racial and ethnic composition Note: the US Census treats Hispanic/Latino as an ethnic category. This table excludes Latinos from the racial categories and assigns them to a separate category. Hispanics/Latinos may be of any race.
Race / Ethnicity (NH = Non-Hispanic)	Pop 2000	Pop 2010	Pop 2020	% 2000	% 2010	% 2020
White alone (NH)	8,405	9,289	8,748	91.58%	87.81%	79.69%
Black or African American alone (NH)	69	96	219	0.75%	0.91%	1.99%
Native American or Alaska Native alone (NH)	20	26	15	0.22%	0.25%	0.14%
Asian alone (NH)	60	97	134	0.65%	0.92%	1.22%
Native Hawaiian or Pacific Islander alone (NH)	5	1	4	0.05%	0.01%	0.04%
Other race alone (NH)	3	3	16	0.03%	0.03%	0.15%
Mixed race or Multiracial (NH)	83	127	456	0.90%	1.20%	4.15%
Hispanic or Latino (any race)	533	940	1,386	5.81%	8.89%	12.63%
Total	9,178	10,579	10,978	100.00%	100.00%	100.00%

=== 2020 census ===
As of the 2020 census, Fox Lake had a population of 10,978 and 2,549 families residing in the village. The population density was 1,163.42 inhabitants per square mile (449.20/km^{2}), and there were 5,828 housing units at an average density of 617.63 per square mile (238.47/km^{2}).

The median age was 45.7 years. 17.5% of residents were under the age of 18 and 20.4% of residents were 65 years of age or older. For every 100 females there were 98.0 males, and for every 100 females age 18 and over there were 97.6 males age 18 and over.

95.3% of residents lived in urban areas, while 4.7% lived in rural areas.

There were 5,127 households in Fox Lake, of which 21.8% had children under the age of 18 living in them. Of all households, 36.6% were married-couple households, 24.8% were households with a male householder and no spouse or partner present, and 30.2% were households with a female householder and no spouse or partner present. About 38.2% of all households were made up of individuals and 16.1% had someone living alone who was 65 years of age or older.

Of all housing units, 12.0% were vacant. The homeowner vacancy rate was 2.1% and the rental vacancy rate was 4.9%.

=== Income and poverty ===
The median income for a household in the village was $62,615, and the median income for a family was $88,313. Males had a median income of $46,368 versus $33,223 for females. The per capita income for the village was $35,159. About 4.5% of families and 9.8% of the population were below the poverty line, including 12.4% of those under age 18 and 9.0% of those age 65 or over.

== Government ==
"Fox Lake incorporated under a Village form of government, with an elected village president, six trustees, and a village clerk. The village president is also recognized as the mayor." The table below is a list of mayors from the village's inception in 1907 to present.

Mayor's name	Date(s)	Mayor's name	Date(s)
John Brown	1907–1913	C.H. Ostrander	1913–1914
Harry A. Maypole	1915–1917	William C. Nagle	1917–1921
Ernest Hummel	1921–1923	Louis Deproft	1923–1929
George Hollister	1929–1931	Arthur J. Amundsen	1935–1949
Carl E. Erickson	1949–1953	Albert E. Hoffmeyer	1953–1957
Joseph Armondo	1957–1961	Marius "Bossie" Olsen	1961–1965
Joseph Armondo	1965–1975	John Hodge	1976–1978
Richard "Butch" Hamm	1978–1985	William Dam	1985–1989
Frank Meier	1989–1993	Ken Hamsher	1993–1997
Jim Pappas	1997–2001	Nancy Koske	2001–2005
Cindy Irwin	2005–2009	Ed Bender	2009–2013
Donny Schmit	2013–present		

== Education ==
- Grant Community High School (9–12)
- Fox Lake Grade School District 114
- Stanton Middle School (5–8)
- Big Hollow Elementary School Big Hollow School District 38 (K–8)
- Gavin Elementary School (Pre-K–5)

== Transportation ==
Pace provides bus service on Routes 570 and 806 connecting Fox Lake to Crystal Lake, Grayslake, and other destinations.

Fox Lake station is the terminus of the Milwaukee District North Line over which Metra provides commuter rail service to Union Station in Chicago.

=== Major streets ===
- Wilmot Road
- State Park Road
- Grass Lake Road
- U.S. Route 12/Fox Lake Road
- Grand Avenue/Lake St.
- Illinois Route 173
- Rollins Road
- Big Hollow Road
- Nippersink Road

== Notable people ==
- Charles Joseph "Joe" Gliniewicz, police lieutenant, who committed suicide in September 2015.
- Alexander Joseph McGavick, bishop of the Roman Catholic Diocese of La Crosse
- Ann-Margret, Ann-Margret Olsson, actor, singer, dancer once lived in Fox Lake.
