= Sokolac, Montenegro =

Sokolac Соколац
- Village
- Location within Montenegro
- Country: Montenegro
- Municipality: Bijelo Polje

Population (2011)
  - Total: 91
- Time zone: UTC+1 (CET)
  - Summer (DST): UTC+2 (CEST)

Sokolac (Montenegrin and Serbian Cyrillic: Соколац) is a small village in the municipality of Bijelo Polje, Montenegro.

== Demographics ==
According to the 2003 census, the village had a population of 184 people.

According to the 2011 census, its population was 91.

Ethnicity in 2011
Ethnicity	Number	Percentage
Serbs	86	94.5%
other/undeclared	5	5.5%
Total	91	100%
