= 2023 Los Angeles spree shootings =

Series of crimes in California, United States

- Date: November 26–29, 2023
- Type: Mass shooting
- Deaths: 4
- Accused: Jerrid Joseph Powell

The 2023 Los Angeles spree shootings are a series of fatal shootings that occurred in Los Angeles County, California in November 2023. Four shooting deaths were linked to this series by ballistic tests. The suspect, Jerrid Joseph Powell, was arrested on December 2.

== Shootings ==
Jose Bolanos, a 37-year-old homeless man was found dead around 3 a.m. on November 26 in an alley in South Los Angeles. The following day, Mark Diggs, a 62-year-old homeless man, was shot while pushing a shopping cart around 5 a.m. near downtown. On November 28, 42-year-old Nicholas Simbolon was followed while driving to his home in San Dimas, and was then killed in a robbery and murder just before 7 p.m. The next day, Shawn Alvarez, a 52-year-old homeless man, was shot in the Lincoln Heights around 2:30 a.m.

The weapon recovered from Powell’s grey 2024 BMW M440i after the arrest was a handgun.
