= Zaton =

Zaton may refer to:

- Zaton, Dubrovnik-Neretva County, Croatia
- Zaton, Šibenik-Knin County, Croatia
- Zaton, Zadar County, Croatia
- Zátoň, a village in Větřní, Český Krumlov District, Czech Republic
- Zátoň, a village in Lenora (Prachatice District), Czech Republic
- Zaton, Montenegro
- Zatoń Dolna, a village in Poland
- Zaton (lake), a karst lake in Ponoarele, Mehedinți County, Romania
- Zaton, Astrakhan Oblast, Russia
- Zaton, Perm Krai, Russia
- Zaton, Voronezh Oblast, Russia
- Zaton neighbourhood of the city of Ufa, Bashkortostan, Russia
  - Zaton Bridge
