= Sipailovo neighbourhood =

Sipailovo (Bashkir: Һупайлы, Russian: Сипайлово) is a neighbourhood of Ufa, Bashkortostan. It is bordered by the Ufa River on the east and the south and the Glumilino neighbourhood on the north and the Inors neighbourhood on the northeast conditional. It is a residential area, containing the Kashkadan park.

Sipailovo neighbourhood is also a former Sipailovo village.

== Gallery ==
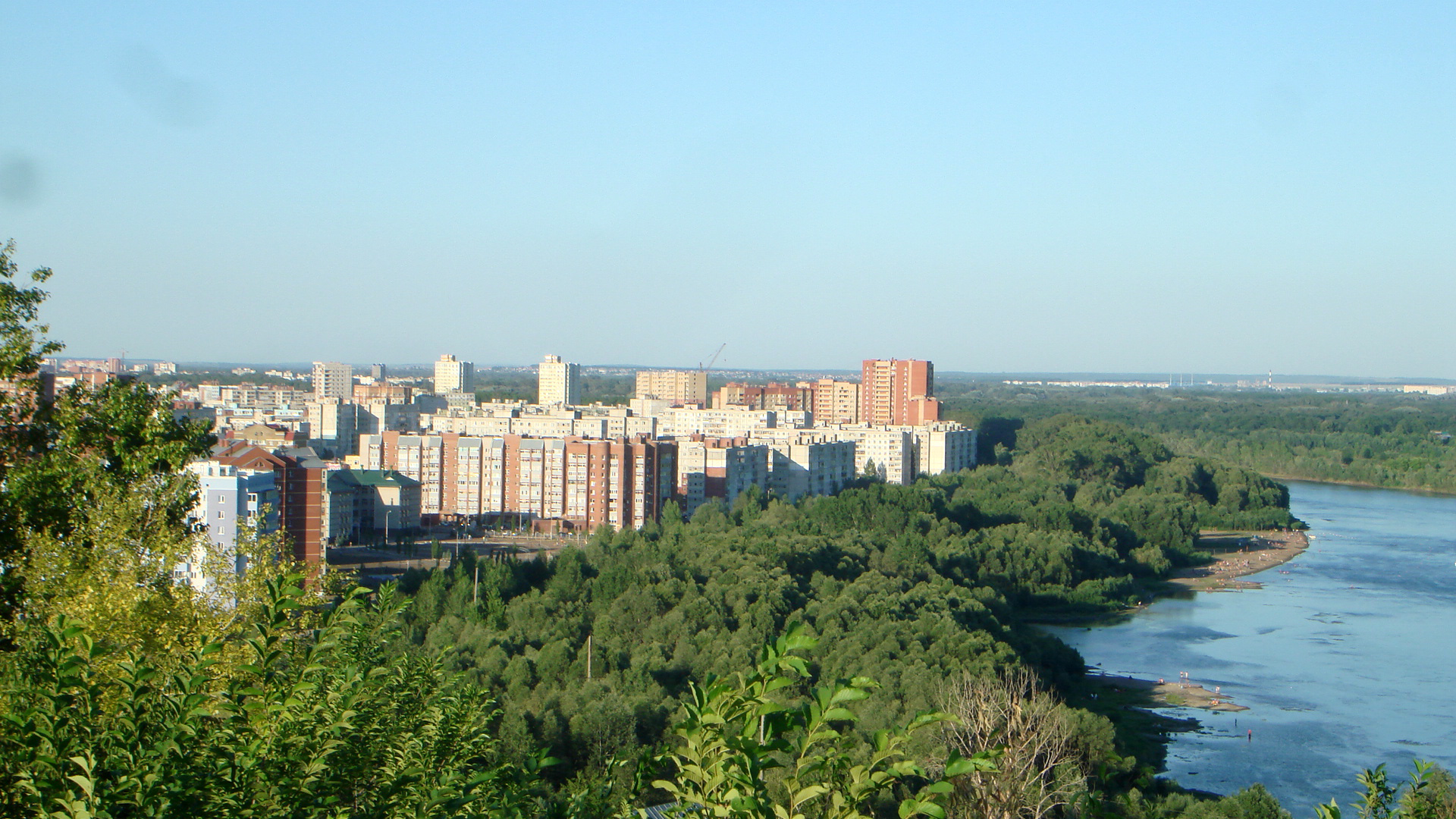
Ufa, Sipailovo at summer

== Transport ==
- No.110 Inors neighbourhood →Sipailovo neighbourhood→Ufa International Airport
- No.101 Ufa Railway Station→Sipailovo neighbourhood→Inors neighbourhood
- No.230 Dzerzhinsky Street→ Kashkadan Park (Sipailovo neighbourhood)
- No.251 Ufa Station→ Kashkadan Park (Sipailovo neighbourhood)
