= Ufa railway station =

Railway terminus on the Trans-Siberian Railway

Ufa Уфа
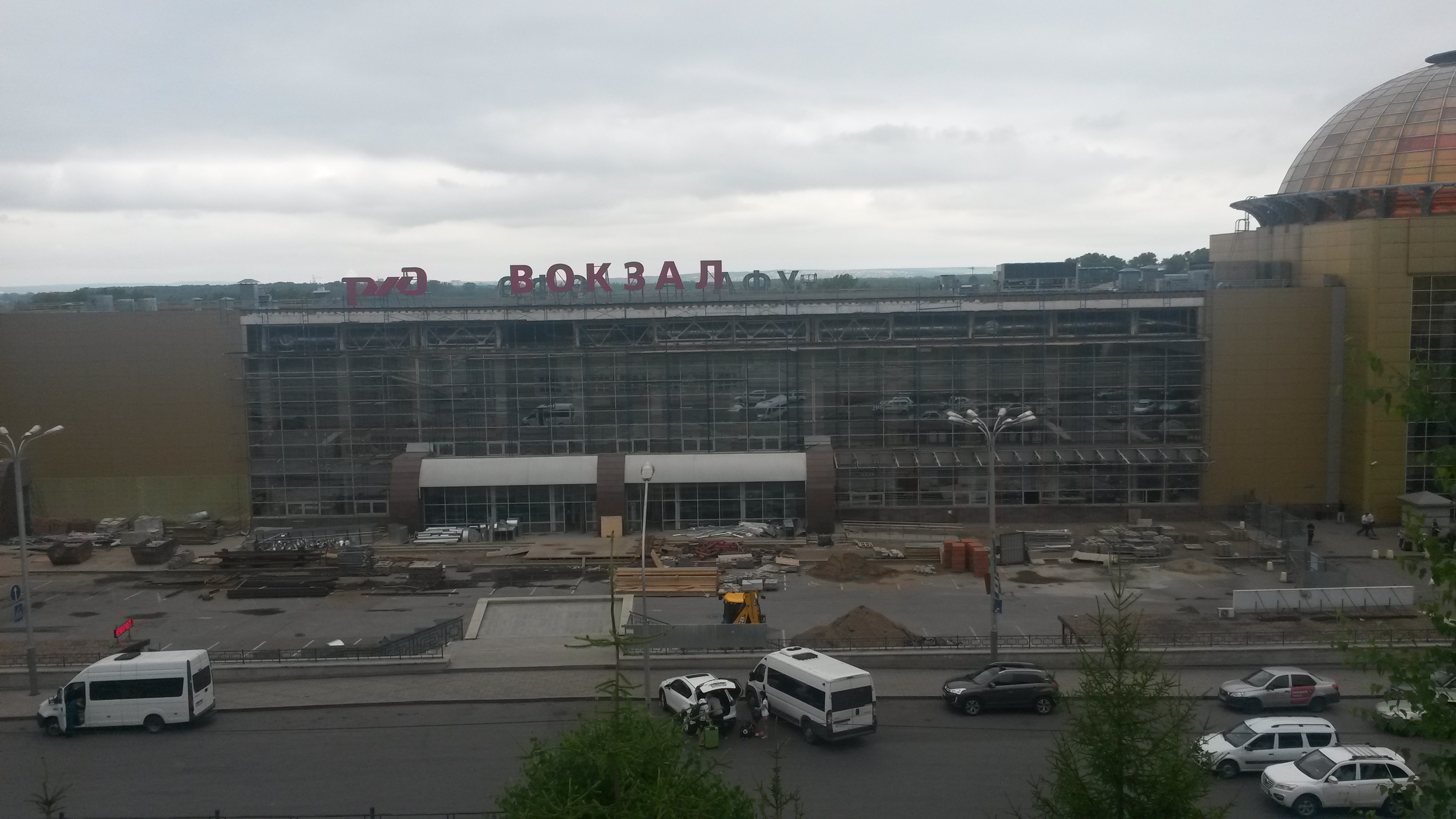
- Ufa railway station reconstruction on 14 July 2019

General information
- Location: 3, Privokzalnaya Sq., Ufa, the Republic of Bashkortostan, Russia
- Coordinates: 54°45′8″N 55°57′20″E
- System: Kuybyshev Railway terminal
- Platforms: 4 (3 island platforms)
- Tracks: 11
- Connections: the Railway station transport interchange

Construction
- Parking: yes

Other information
- Station code: 654504
- Fare zone: 0

History
- Opened: 1888
- Rebuilt: 1974, 2004 - now
- Electrified: 1952
Location
- Location within Bashkortostan Location within Russia

Ufa is a Central Ufa railway terminus, located in the Sovetsky District of Ufa on the historical direction of the Trans-Siberian Railway.

In managerial terms, the station enters the Bashkir region of the Kuybyshev Railway.

== History ==
The history of Ufa Station is associated with the construction of the Samara-Ufa railway. Construction on the Samara-Ufa railway began in 1885, and in 1888 it was brought to the city of Ufa. In 1888 the station began to function as the railway's final destination.

In 1890, the Ufa-Zlatoust section was built. In 1892, the Zlatoust-Chelyabinsk section was built. From the opening of traffic on the Siberian railway and on the Yekaterinburg - Chelyabinsk branch (1896) to the opening of the Petersburg-Vologda-Vyatka railway (1906), the station was located on the only rail track connecting Russia and Europe with the Urals, Siberia and the Far East.

The location for the Ufa railway station was determined in 1885, and its first building in eclectic style was operated from 1888 to 1967 (architect F. F. Essen).

Ufa Station's modern building was constructed in 1968 (project K. Gottlieb). Its reconstruction began in May, 2006. The first stage of the renovated station was open on 17 December 2008.

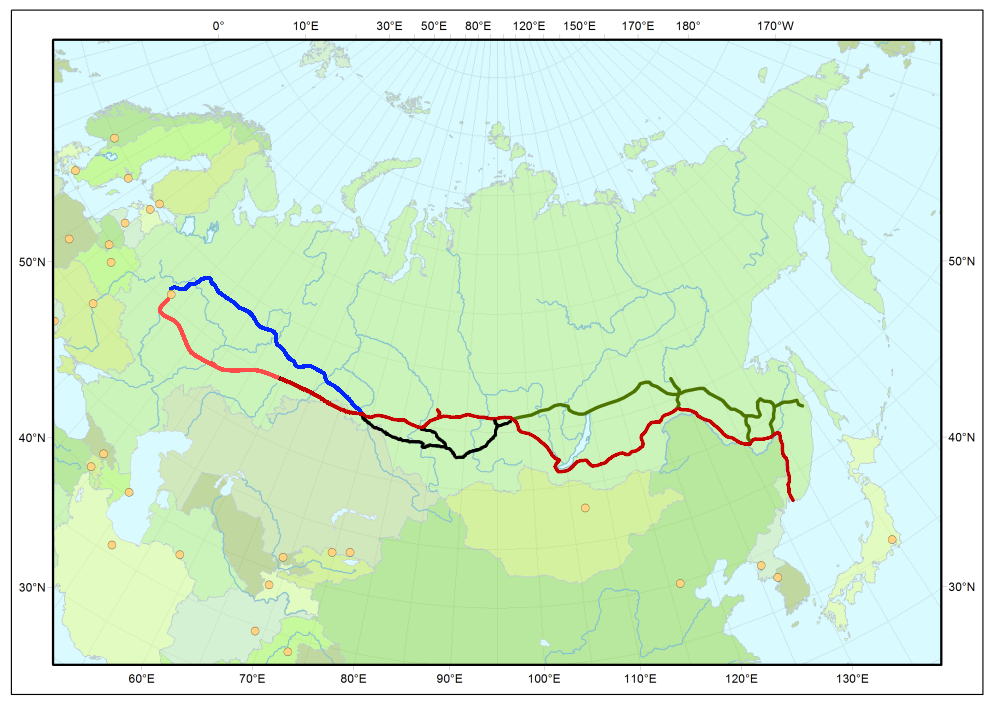
Transsib scheme: historical direction, north direction, Baikal–Amur Mainline, span of the southern route in Siberia

== Transport ==
- No.101 Ufa Railway Station → Ufa International Airport
- No.3 Dzerzhinsky Street→ Belorechensky neighbourhood
- No.74 Dzerzhinsky Street→ Ufimsky DOK (Inors neighbourhood)
- No.214 Dzerzhinsky Street→ Milovsky Park (Zaton neighbourhood)
- No.230 Dzerzhinsky Street→ Kashkadan Park (Sipailovo neighbourhood)
- No.239 Ufa Station→North Bus station
- No.251 Ufa Station→ Kashkadan Park (Sipailovo neighbourhood)

== Gallery ==
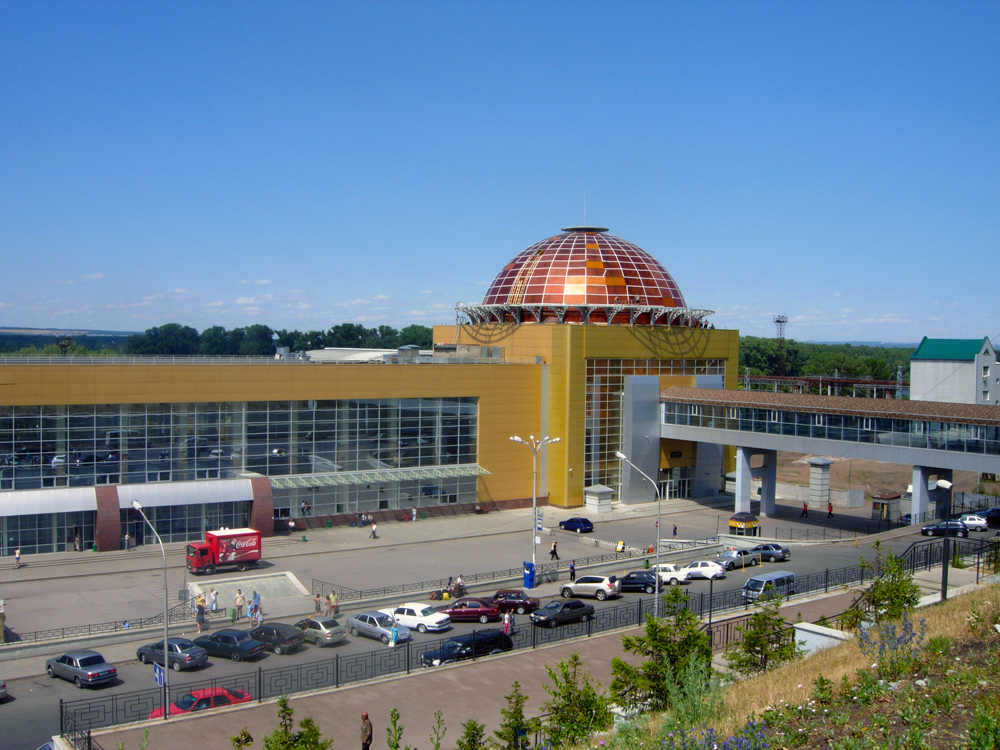
View of the station from the Railway station transport interchange

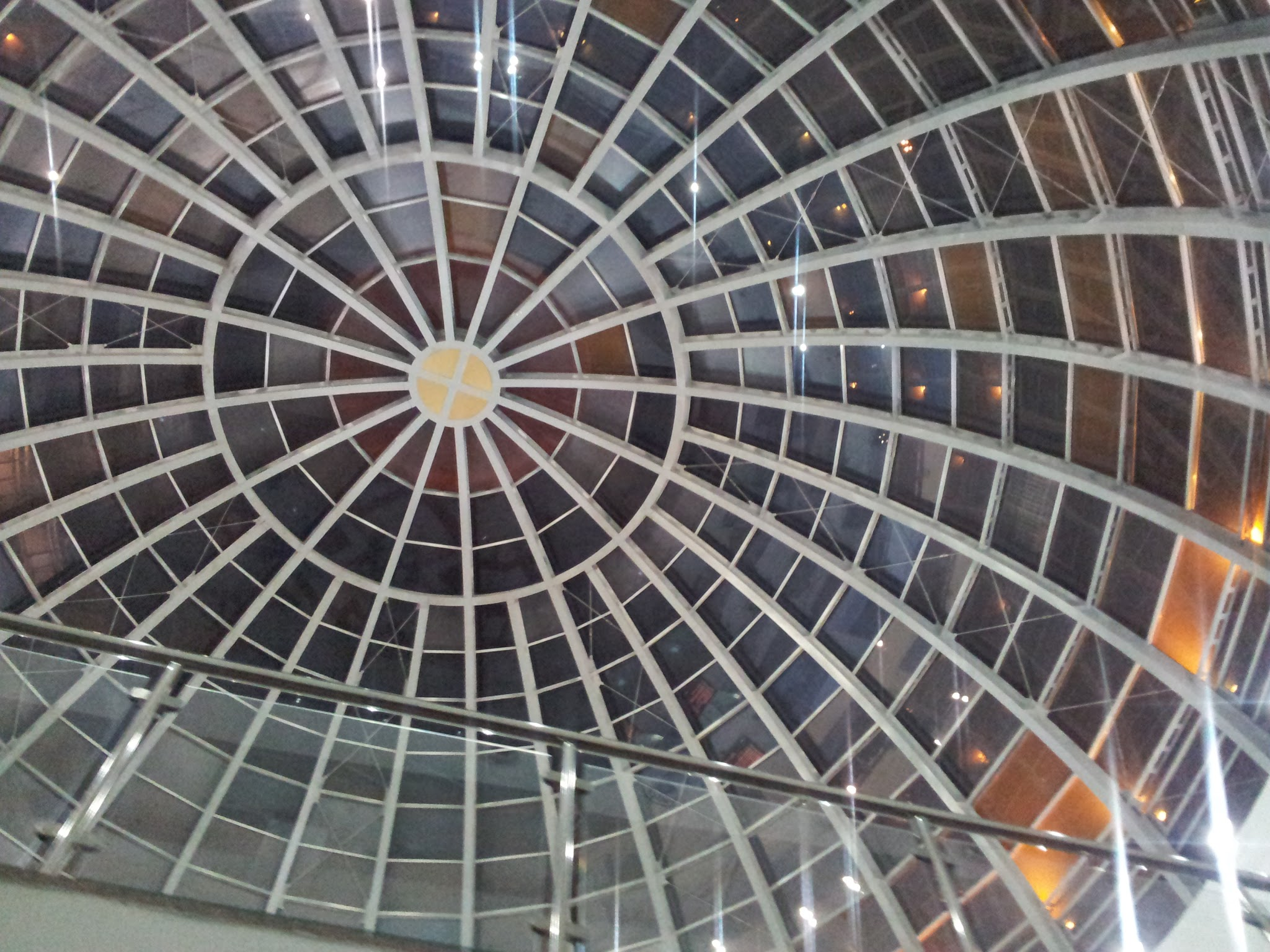
Dome inside the railway station

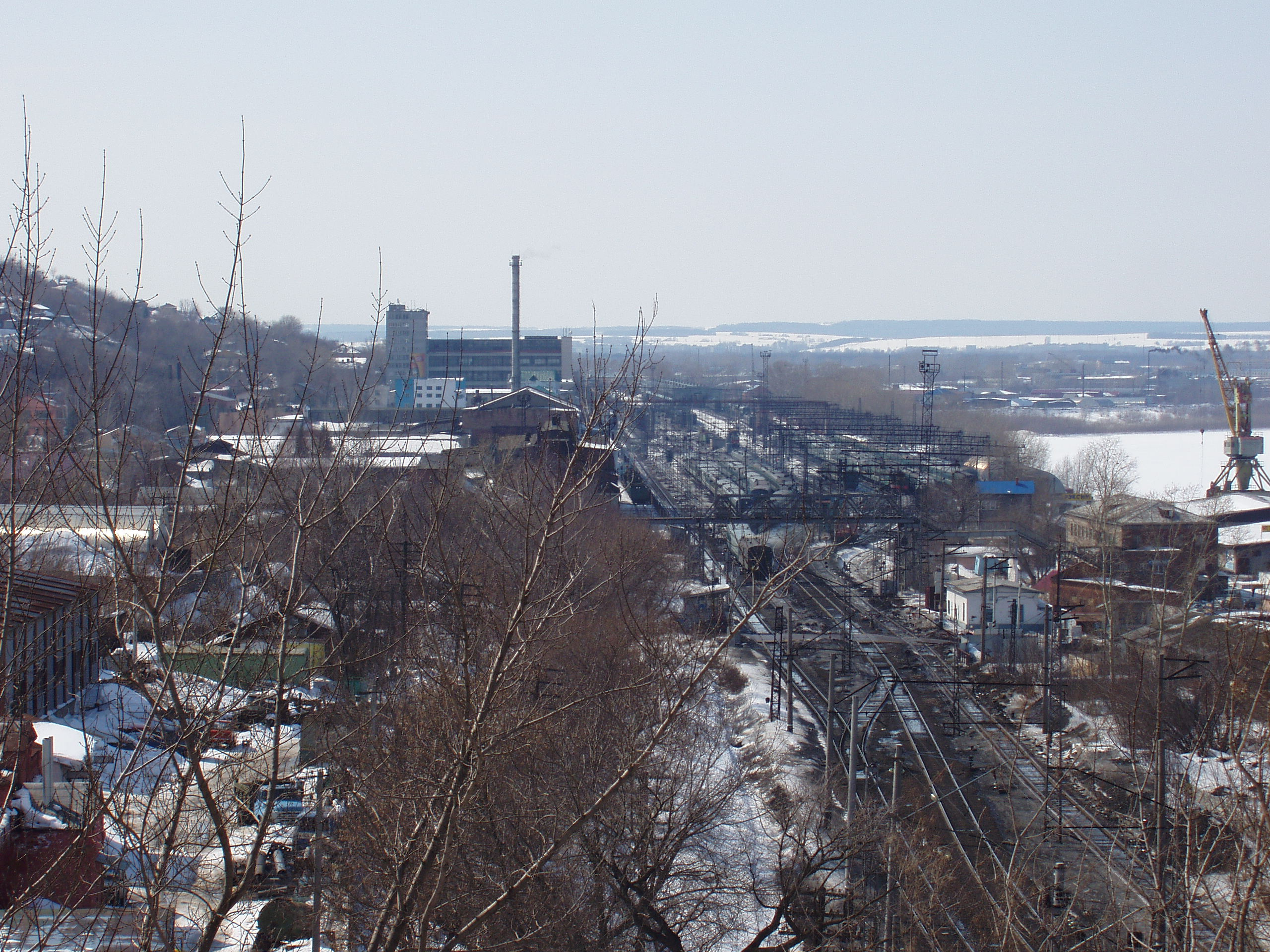
Ufa railway station - view from the bridge at European route E22 - April, 2005

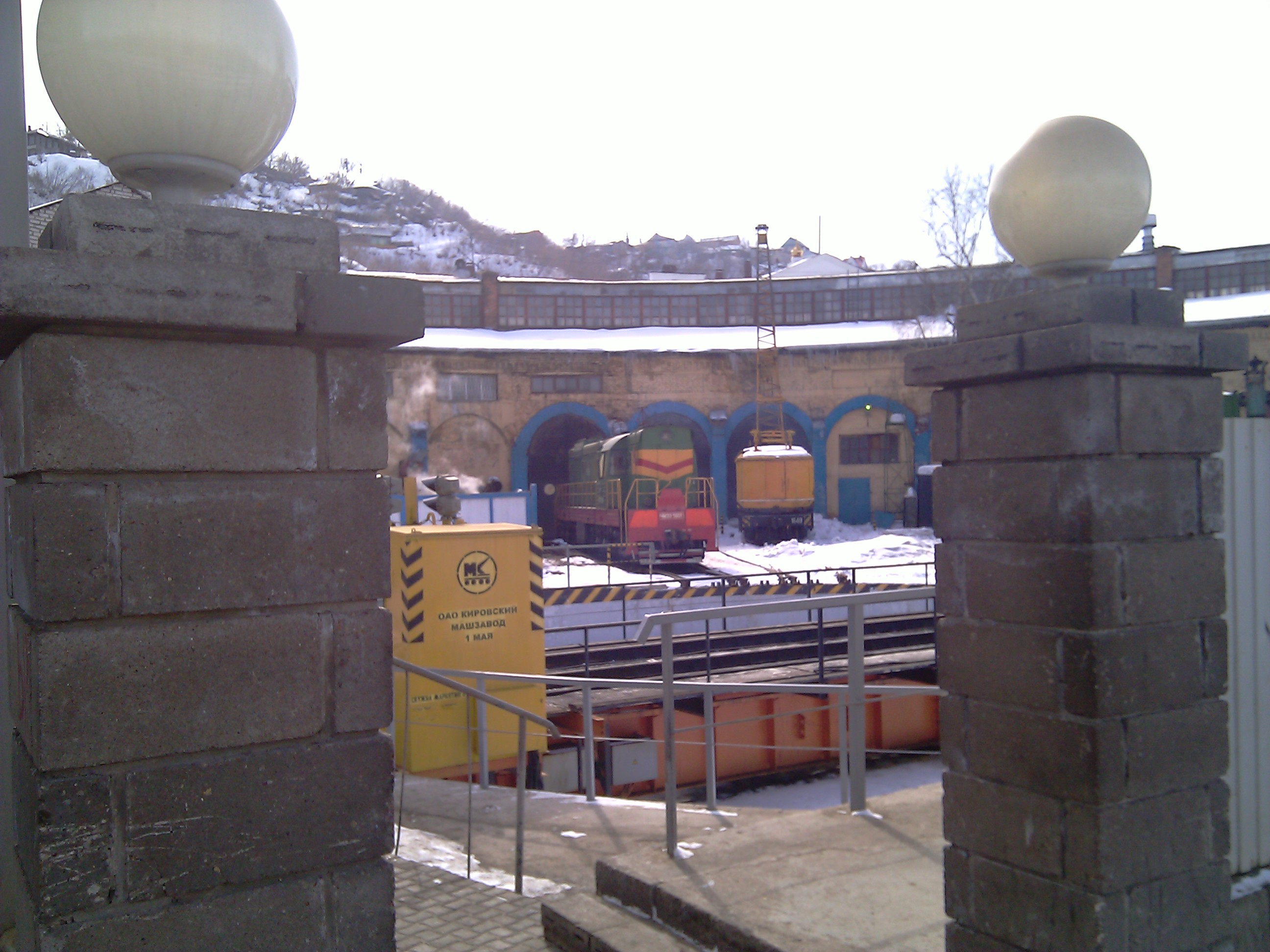
View to service office of Ufa Station

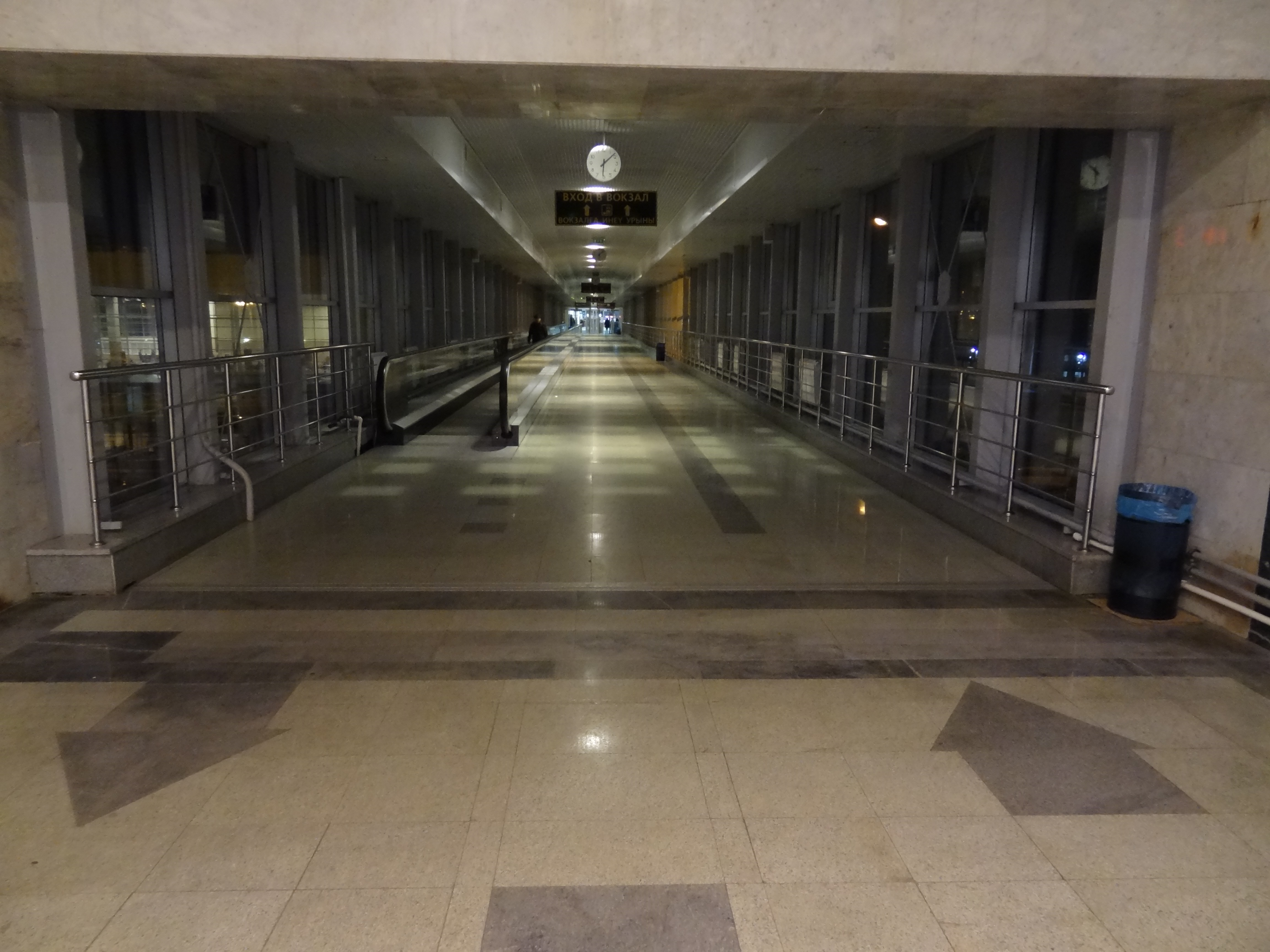
Pass to the Railway station transport interchange

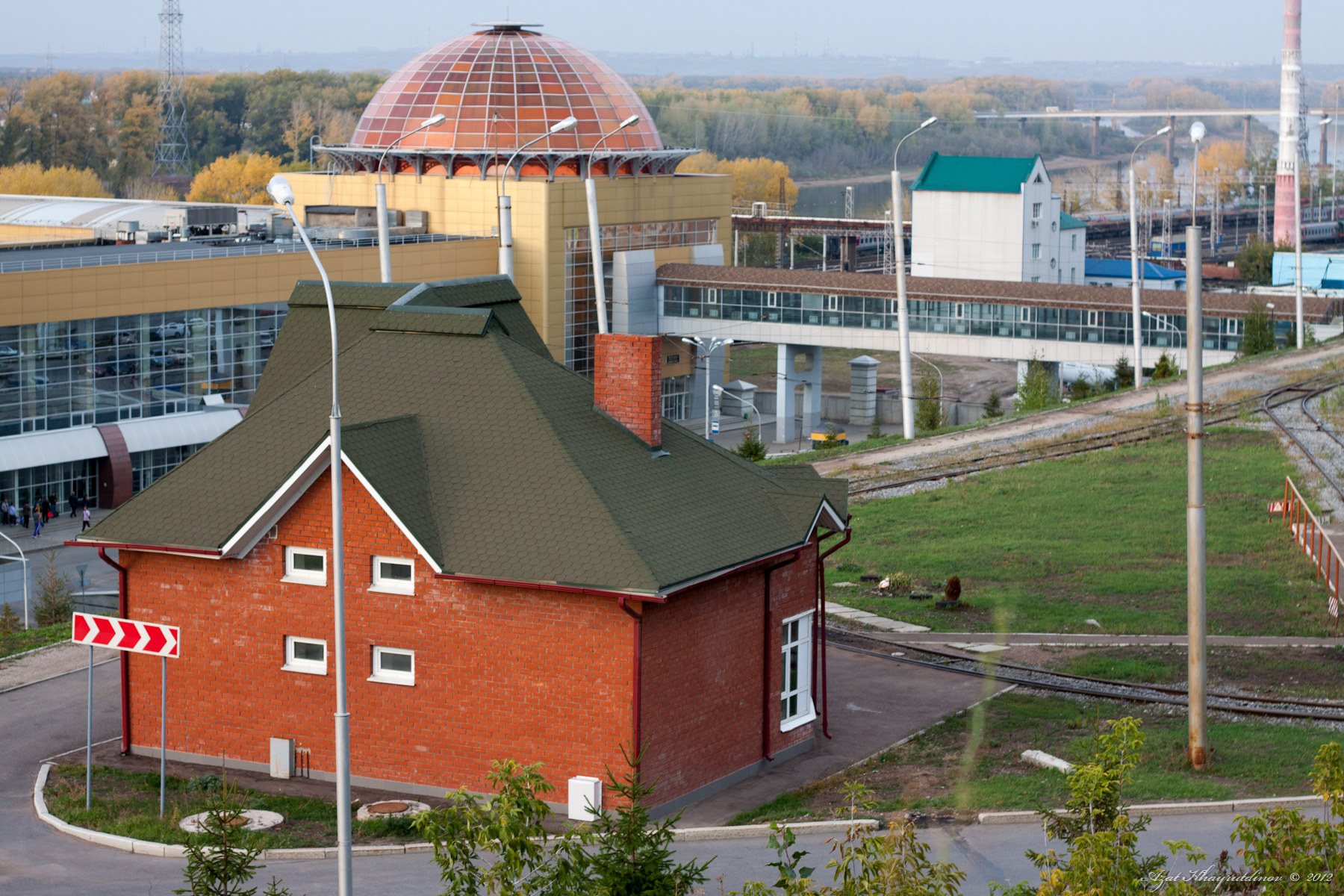
