= Zaton neighbourhood =

Neighbourhood of the city of Ufa, capital of the Republic of Bashkortostan, Russia

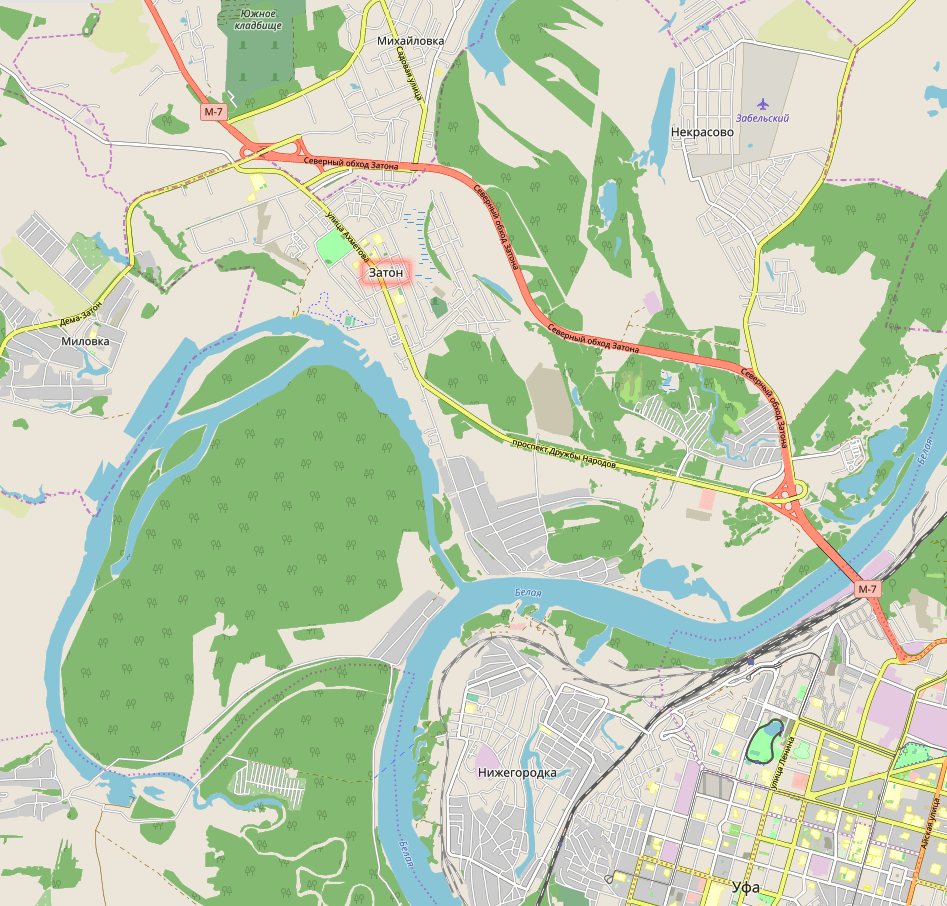
Map showing Zaton and its proximity to Ufa

Zaton neighbourhood is a neighbourhood of the city of Ufa, capital of the Republic of Bashkortostan, Russia. It is bordered by the Belaya River on the east and Volga Highway on the north and Milovka village on the south conditional. It is a residential area, containing the park, the Zaton TEC-combined heat and power plant, ship-repair plant. The population of the district is approximately 50000 people. Inors is also a former the Kirzhackij or Starickij Zaton village.

Zaton neighbourhood is connected by Zaton bridge with the rest of Ufa. Zaton neighbourhood will have been connected by Ufa Eastern Toll Road with the Ural highway, and by that fact with all Ural.

== Gallery ==
Location of Ufa Zaton

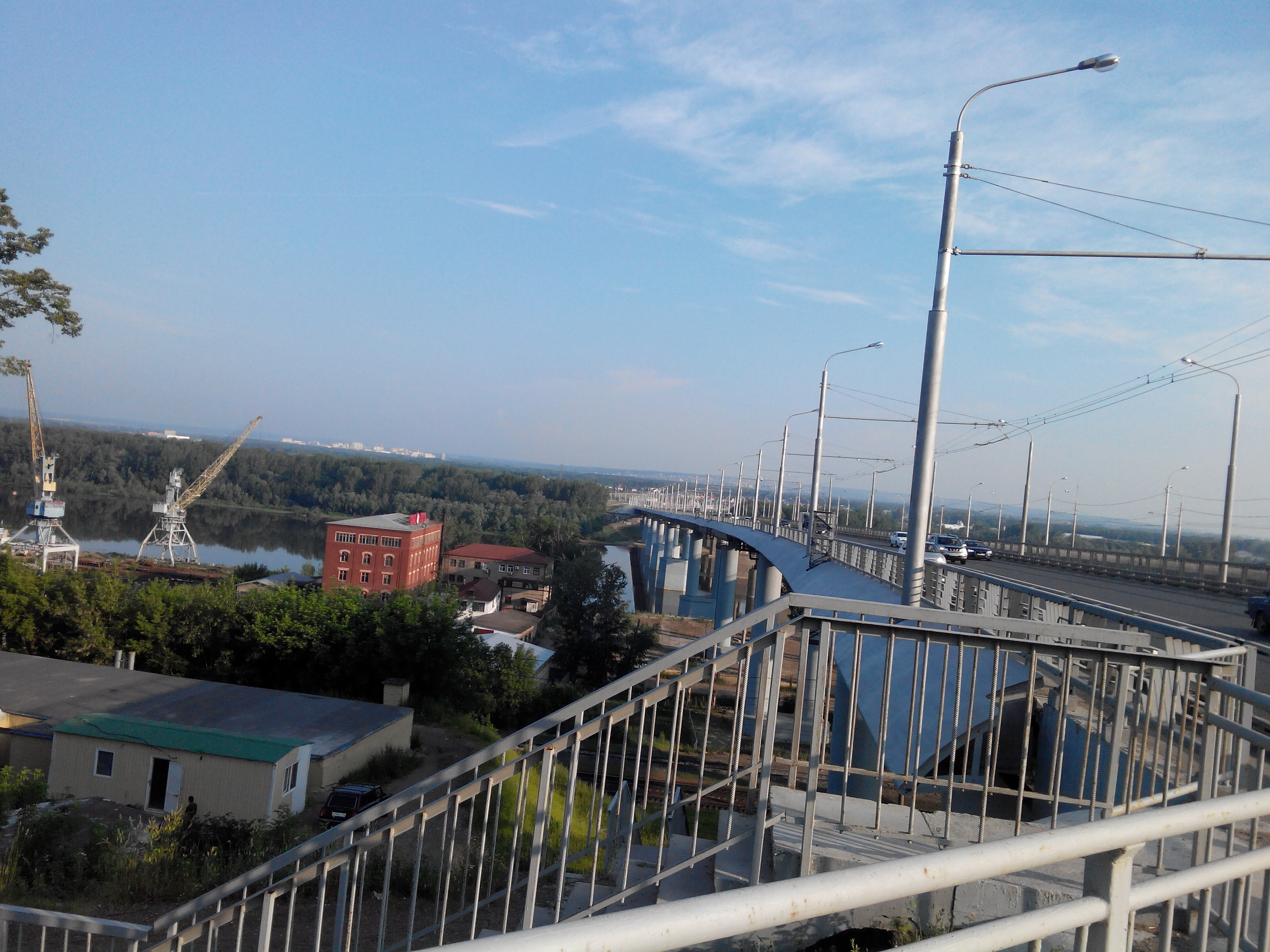
View of the Zaton bridge

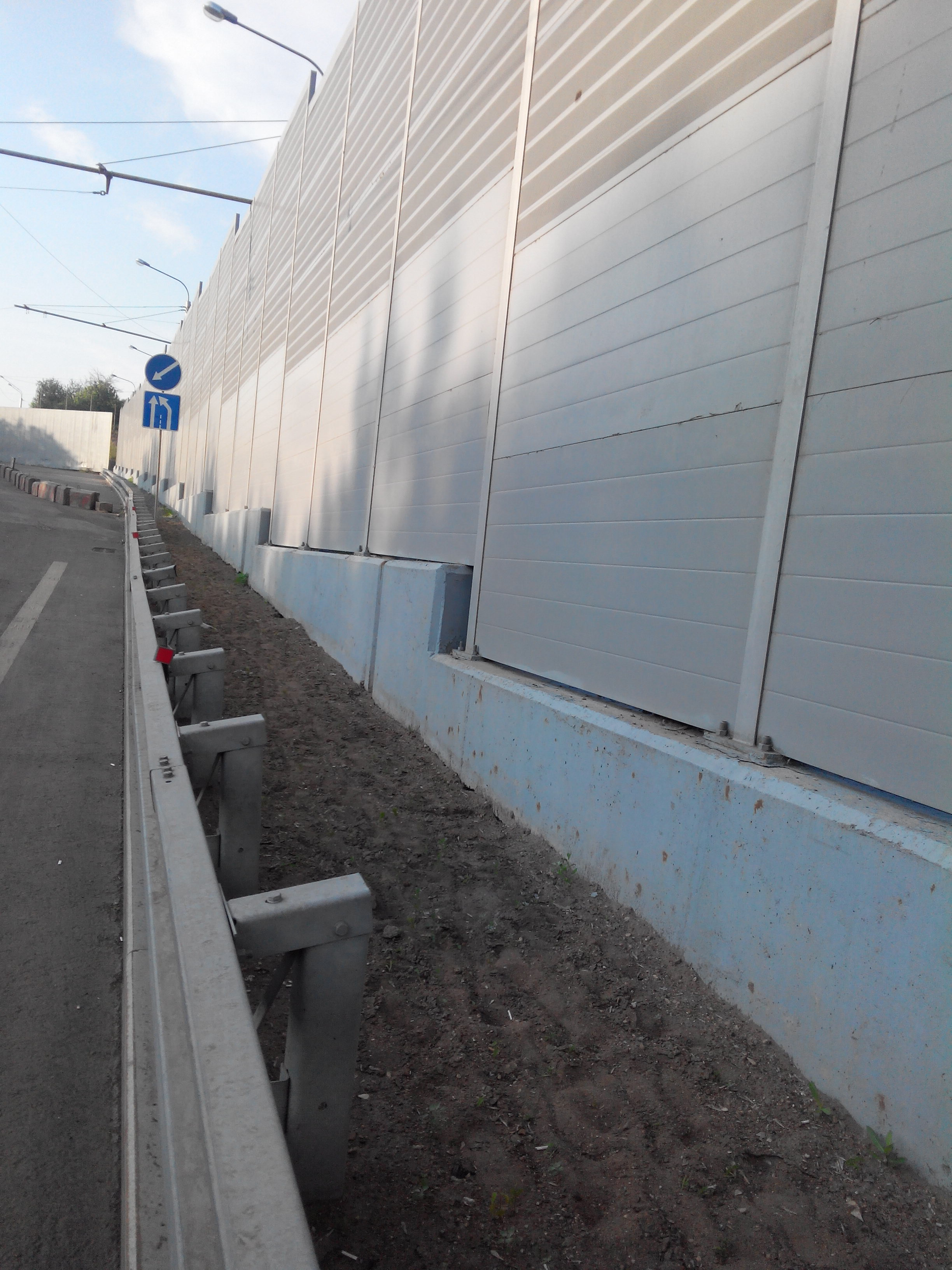
Zaton bridge Unsuccessful architectural decision

== Transport ==
- No.214 Ufa Railway Station→ Zaton neighbourhood
