= Zaton Bridge =

Bridge in Russia

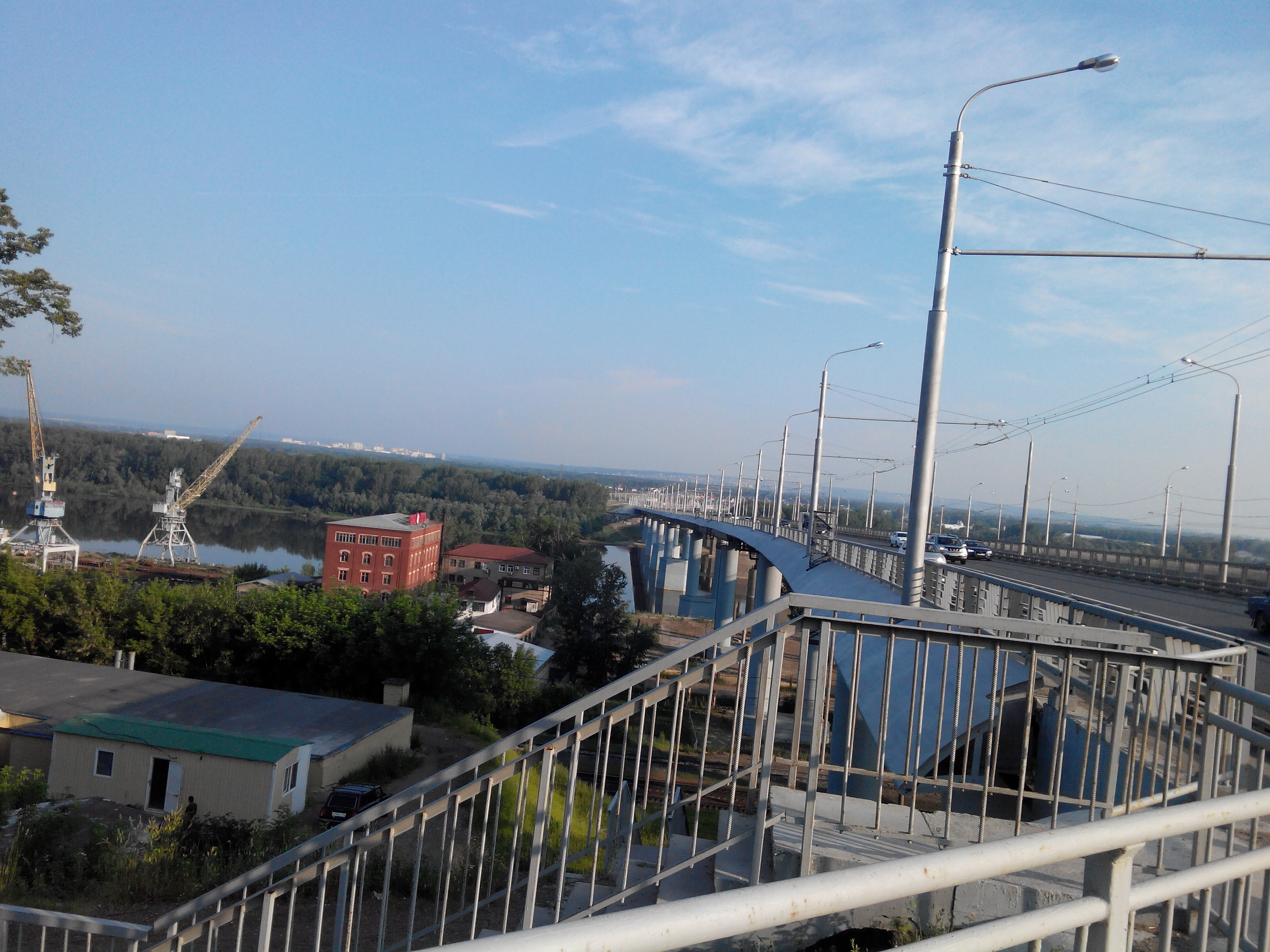
- Coordinates: 54.757888°N 55.963877°E
- Carries: General traffic; pedestrian transit
- Crosses: Belaya River
- Locale: Ufa

Characteristics
- Material: Reinforced concrete and steel
- Trough construction: Asphalt
- Pier construction: Iron
- No. of lanes: 4 vehicular; 2 pedestrian

History
- Opened: 1971, 2016

The Zaton bridge is a bridge, that carries four lanes of traffic over the Belaya River, between Ufa center and Zaton neighbourhood of Ufa, in Bashkortostan.

== History ==
This in fact consists of two bridges which are located close together. One of them was built in 1971 and second was built in 2016 year. Second bridge was built in 2016 year for Ufa Eastern Toll Road project realizing.

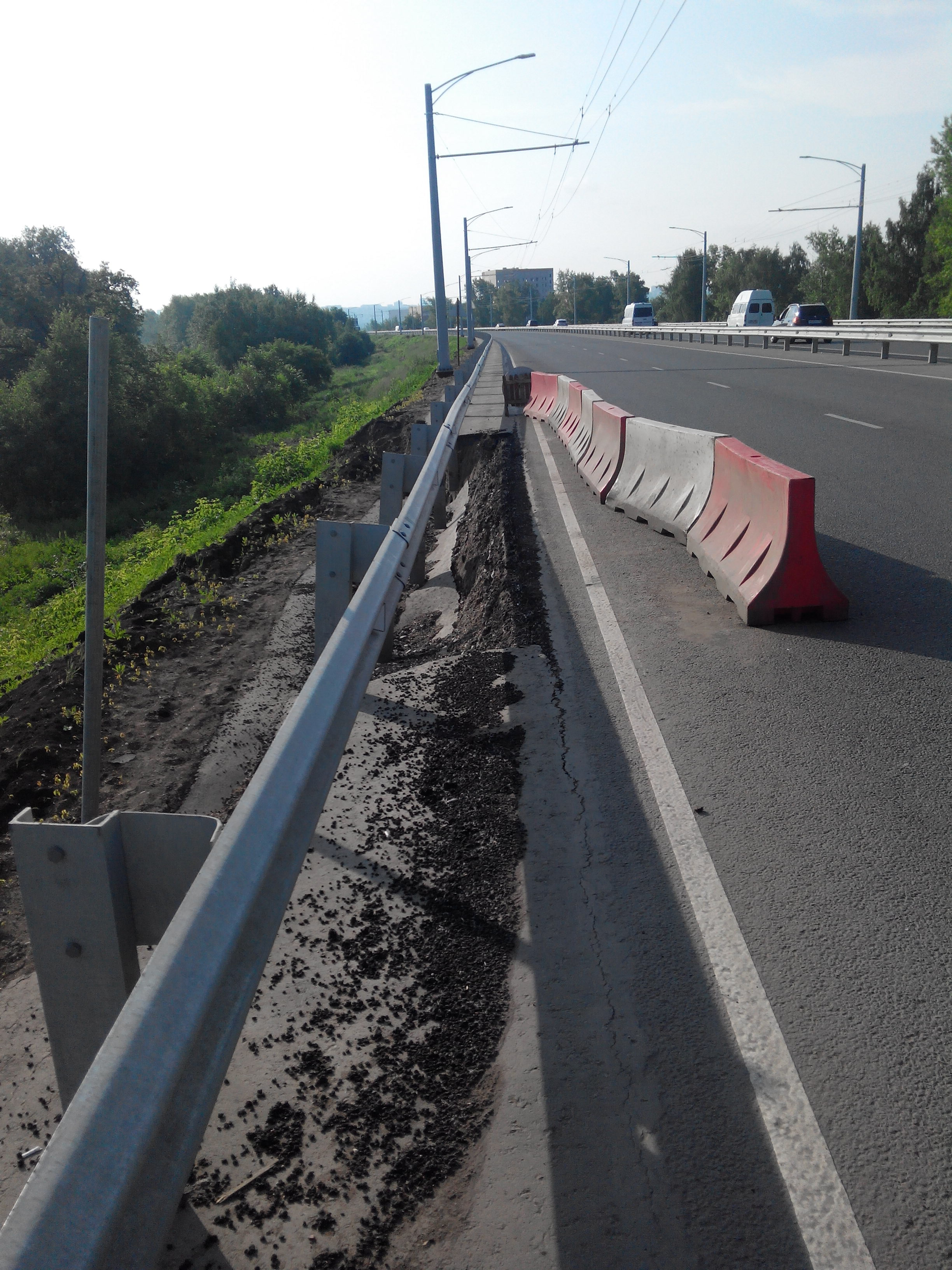
Destruction of asphalt on the Friendship Peoples' Avenue near Zaton bridge

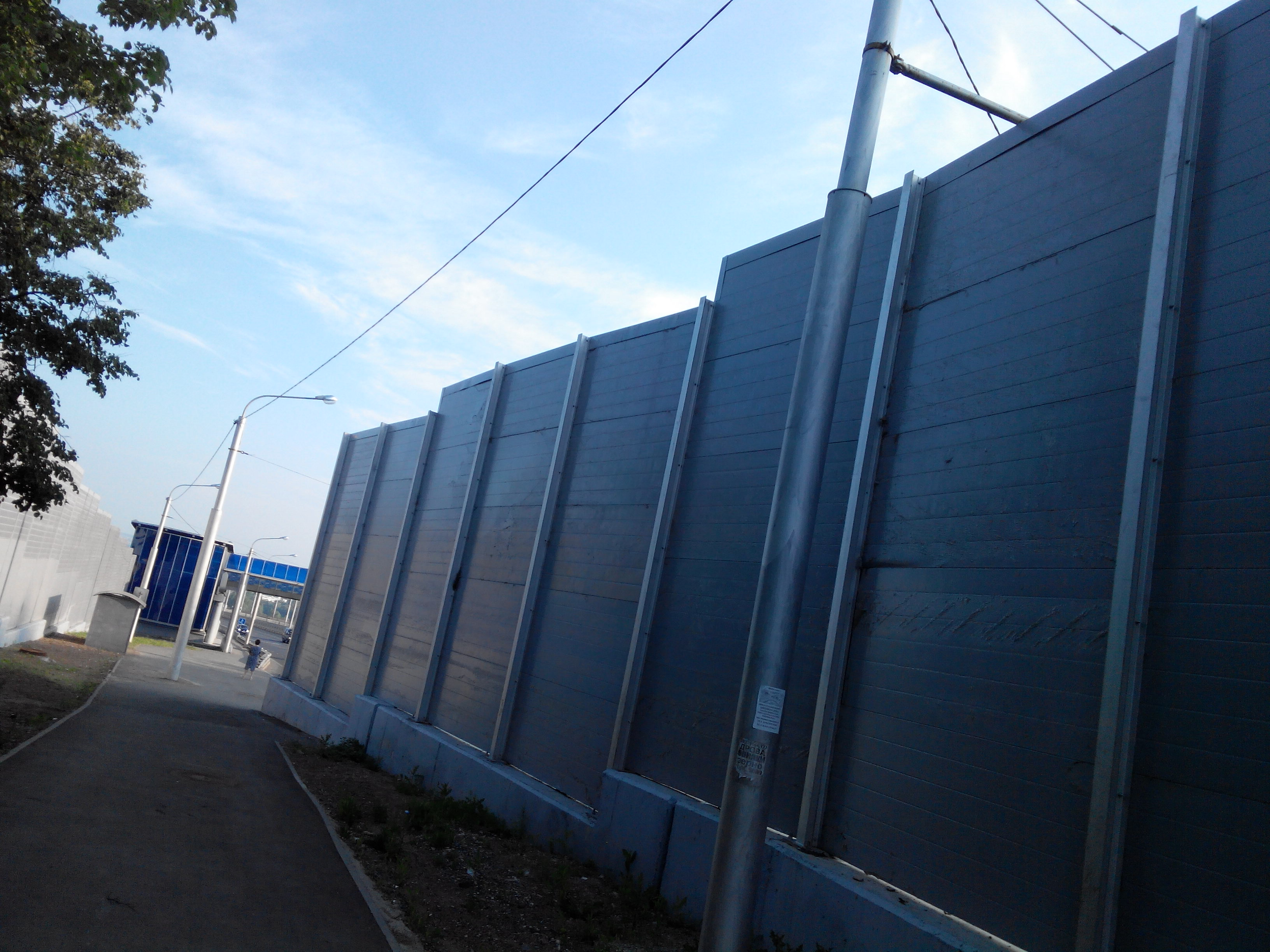
Unsuccessful architectural decision of the Zaton bridge

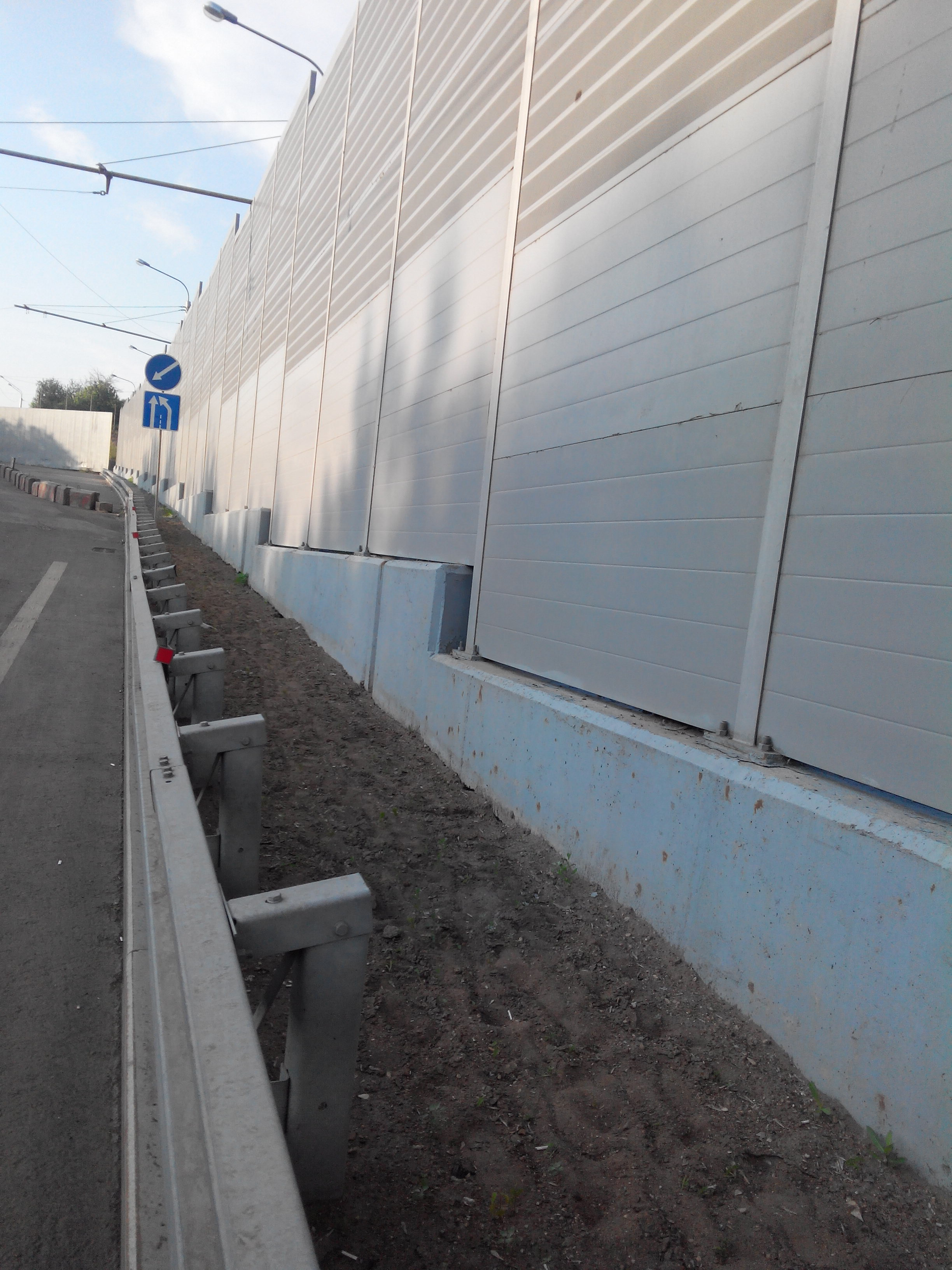
Zaton bridge Unsuccessful architectural decision
