= Zaton, Astrakhan Oblast =

Zaton Затон
- Selo
- Location within Astrakhan Oblast Location within Russia
- Coordinates: 45°54′N 48°09′E
- Country: Russia
- Region: Astrakhan Oblast
- District: Kamyzyaksky District
- Time zone: UTC+4:00

Zaton (Russian: Затон) is a rural locality (a selo) in Karaulinsky Selsoviet, Kamyzyaksky District, Astrakhan Oblast, Russia. The population was 791 as of 2010. There are 6 streets.

== Geography ==
Zaton is located 28 km south of Kamyzyak (the district's administrative centre) by road. Lebyazhye is the nearest rural locality.
