= Zaton, Perm Krai =

Zaton Затон
- Settlement
- Location within Perm Krai Location within Russia
- Coordinates: 59°49′N 56°34′E
- Country: Russia
- Region: Perm Krai
- District: Solikamsky District
- Time zone: UTC+5:00

Zaton (Russian: Затон) is a rural locality (a settlement) in Solikamsky District, Perm Krai, Russia. The population was 508 as of 2010. There are 10 streets.

== Geography ==
Zaton is located 25 km north of Solikamsk (the district's administrative centre) by road. Verkhneye Moshevo is the nearest rural locality.
