= Inors neighbourhood =

Neighbourhood of Ufa, Bashkortostan

Location of Inors

Inors (Bashkir: Инорс/İnors, Russian: Ино́рс/Inors) is a neighbourhood of Ufa, Bashkortostan. It is bordered by the Ufa River on the south and the Ufa engine-building production association teritiory on the north and Sipailovo on the west conditional. It is a residential area, containing the park, the Ufa engine-building production association, the Rezyapov Ufa number 2 thermal power station. The population of the district is approximately 70000 people. Inors is also a former the Bogorodskoe village.

== Gallery ==
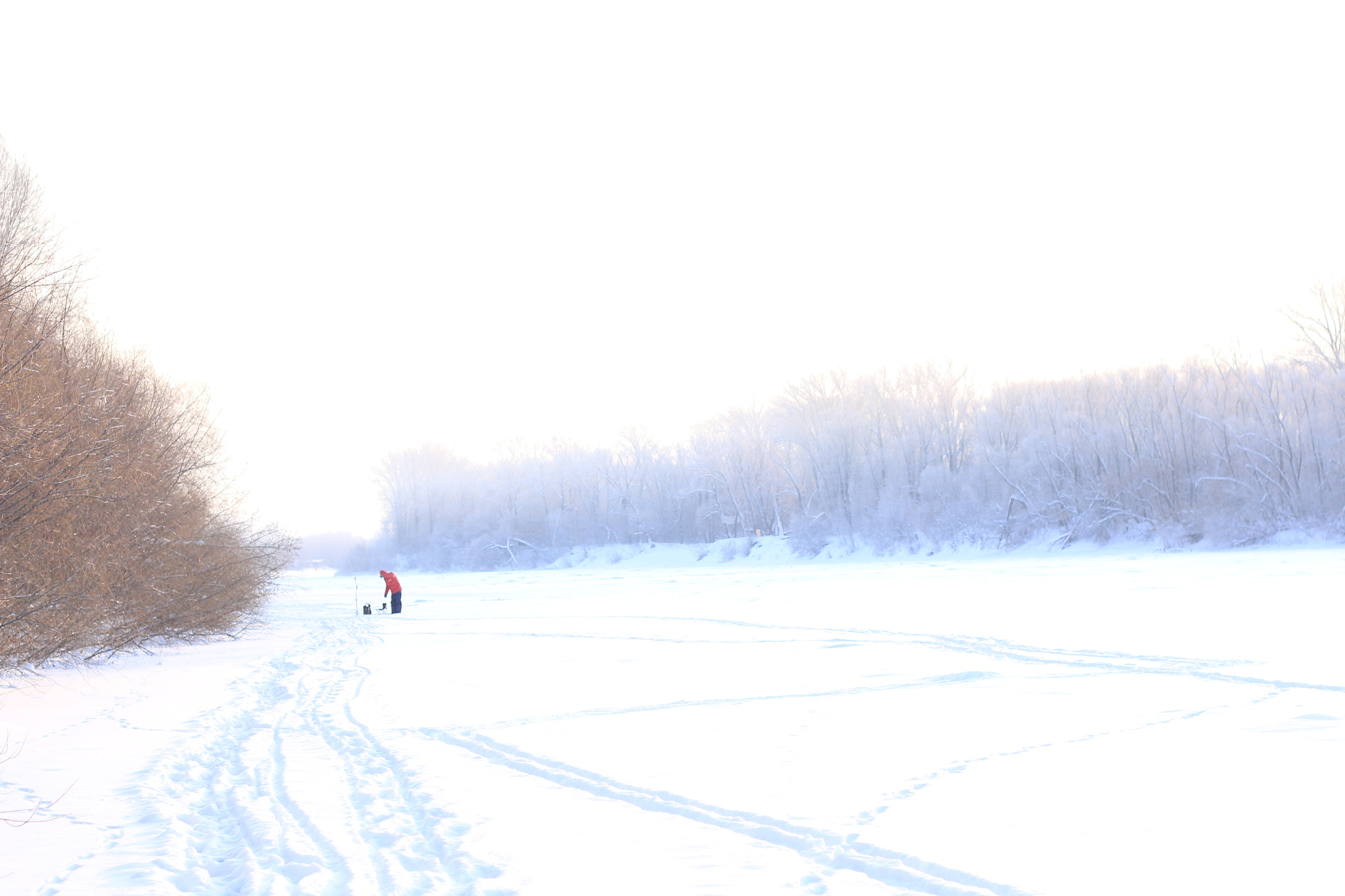
View of Ufa River along Inors neighborhood

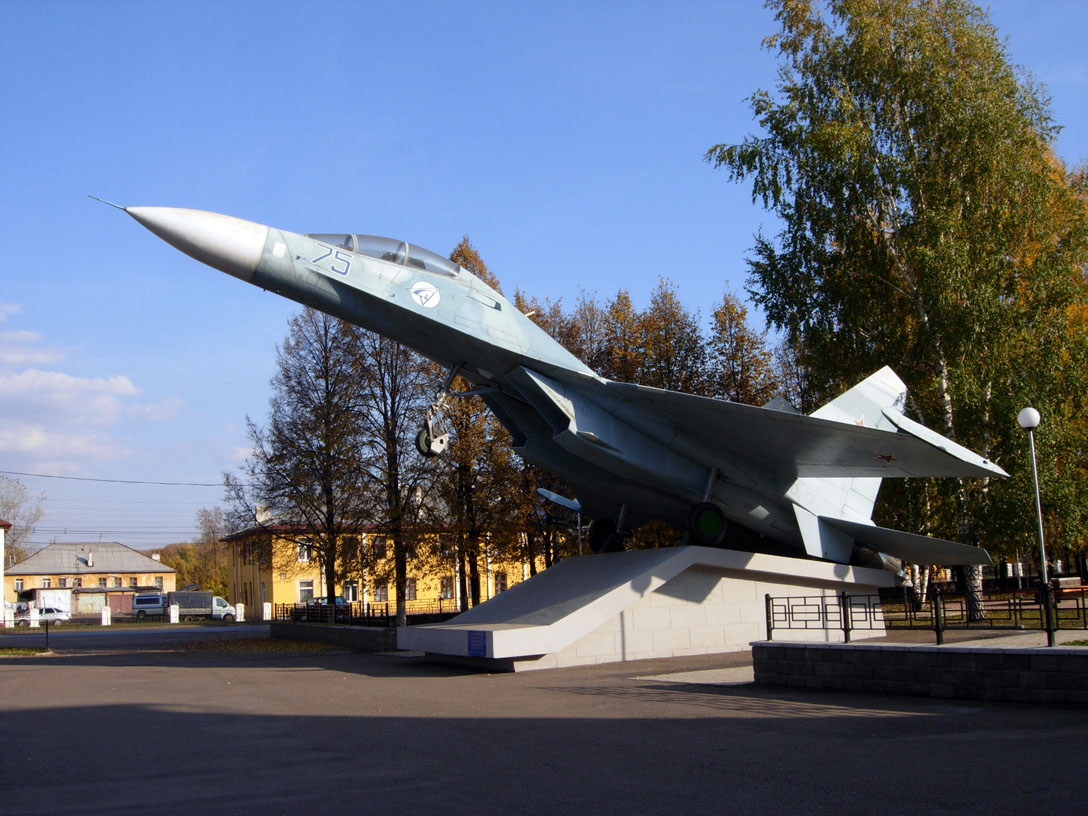
Model of Sukhoi Su-27 in front of Ufa engine-building production association

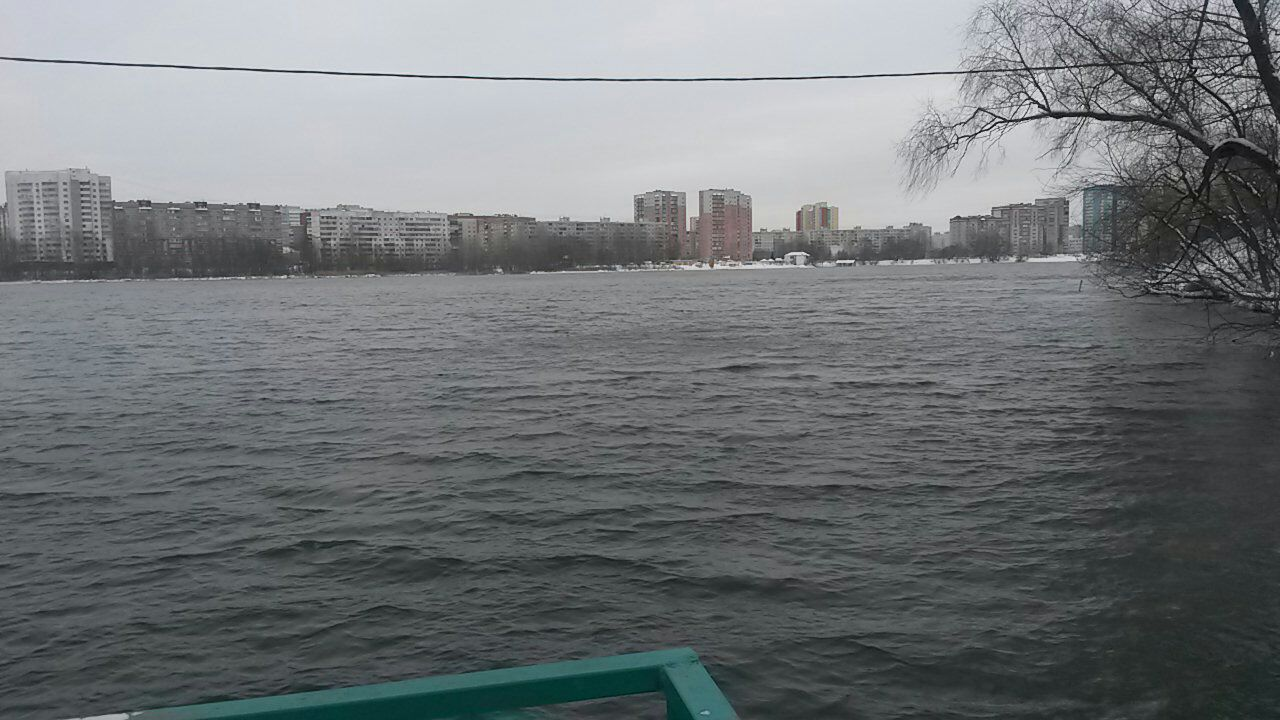
View of Inors-7 neighborhood (houses along Mushnikov street) from the Teploe lake

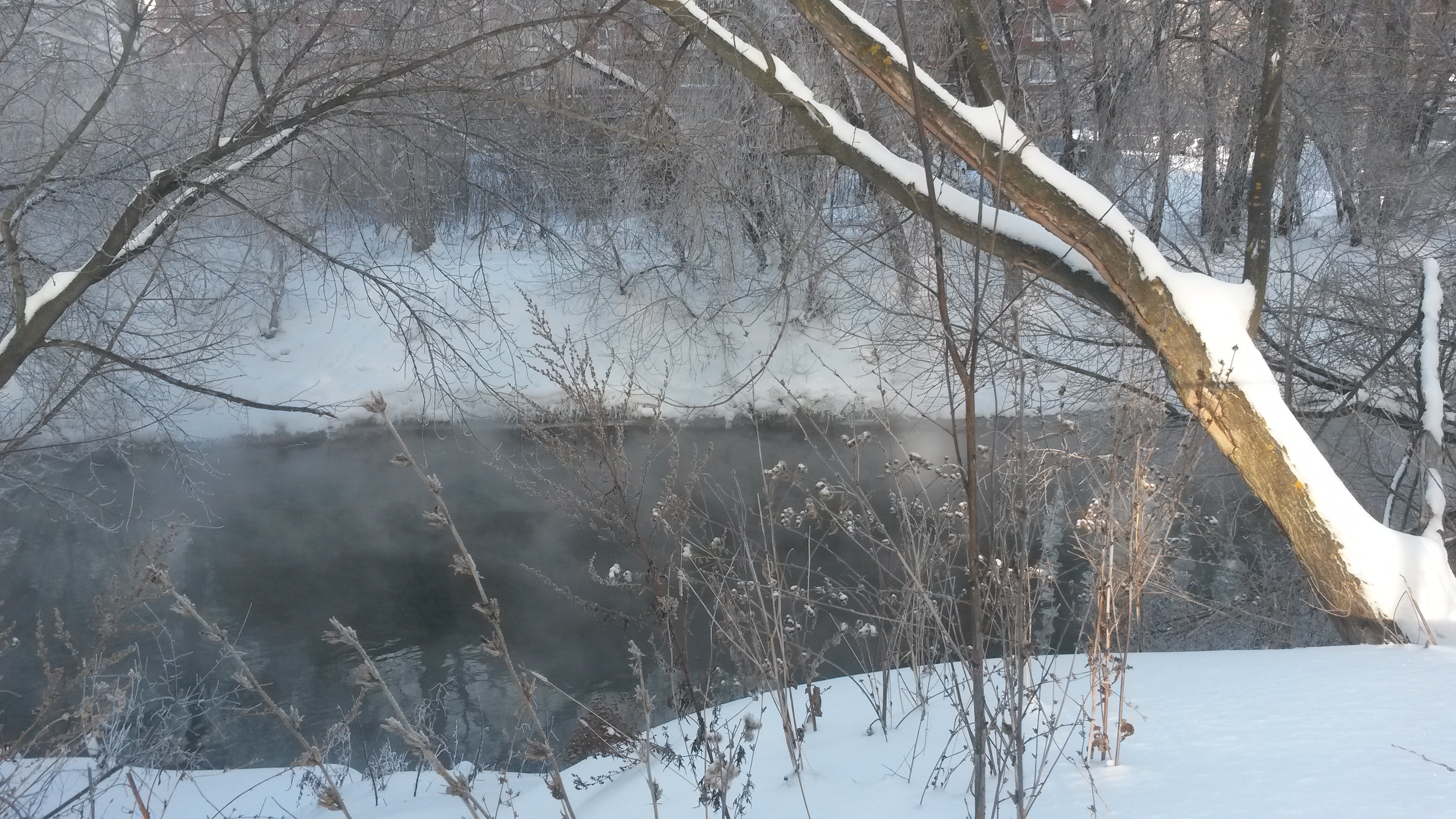
stream from the Rezyapov Ufa number 2 thermal power station to the cooling pond

== Transport ==
- No.110 Inors neighbourhood → Ufa International Airport
- No.74 Ufa Railway Station→ Inors neighbourhood
