= Zaton, Voronezh Oblast =

Zaton Затон
- Selo
- Location within Voronezh Oblast Location within Russia
- Coordinates: 50°39′N 40°44′E
- Country: Russia
- Region: Voronezh Oblast
- District: Vorobyovsky District
- Time zone: UTC+3:00

Zaton (Russian: Зато́н) is a rural locality (a selo) in Solonetskoye Rural Settlement, Vorobyovsky District, Voronezh Oblast, Russia. The population was 739 as of 2010. There are 5 streets.

== Geography ==
Zaton is located 17 km west of Vorobyovka (the district's administrative centre) by road. Solontsy is the nearest rural locality.
