= Ufa Eastern Toll Road =

Eastern Exit (Bashkir: Көнсығыш сығыу юлы, Russian: Восточный выезд) is a road-construction project in Ufa, Bashkortostan, a toll transport corridor connecting the Ufa city centre to the M-5 federal highway.

It is Bashkortostan's largest road project and third-largest in Russia, consisting of a tunnel, a bridge, a bypass road, and a connector to a federal highway. Construction began in 1992, but due to the intermittent financing the work was constantly interrupted. The project is expected to be completed by 2022. Funding comes from several sources: 20 billion - the federal component, 10 billion - a loan of VTB Bank and almost 5 billion allocates by the Republic of Bashkortostan.
