= List of endemic species of Montenegro =

The endemic species of Montenegro listed below include animals, vascular plants, and fungi, with their known distributions given by locality or municipality.

Montenegro is the main hotspot for troglobitic fauna in the Western Balkans. Its fauna includes more than 280 endemic species, of which more than 75 are troglobiotic and at least 30 are Leptodirini beetles.

== List ==
Number of endemic species by municipality in Montenegro
Municipality	Area (km²)	Number of species present	Endemic Species Index (species/100 km²)
Cetinje	899	57	6.34
Podgorica	1,594	50	3.14
Bar	598	41	6.86
Žabljak	445	39	8.76
Kolašin	897	38	4.24
Herceg Novi	235	37	15.74
Kotor	335	32	9.55
Plužine	854	25	2.93
Nikšić	2,065	19	0.92
Pljevlja	1,346	18	1.34
Šavnik	553	16	2.89
Mojkovac	367	15	4.09
Gusinje	157	14	8.92
Andrijevica	283	12	4.24
Danilovgrad	501	11	2.19
Ulcinj	255	10	3.92
Tuzi	236	9	3.81
Budva	122	8	6.56
Plav	328	6	1.83
Berane	544	6	1.10
Tivat	46	3	6.52
Rožaje	432	3	0.69
Bijelo Polje	924	3	0.32
Petnjica	173	0	0.00

== Fauna ==
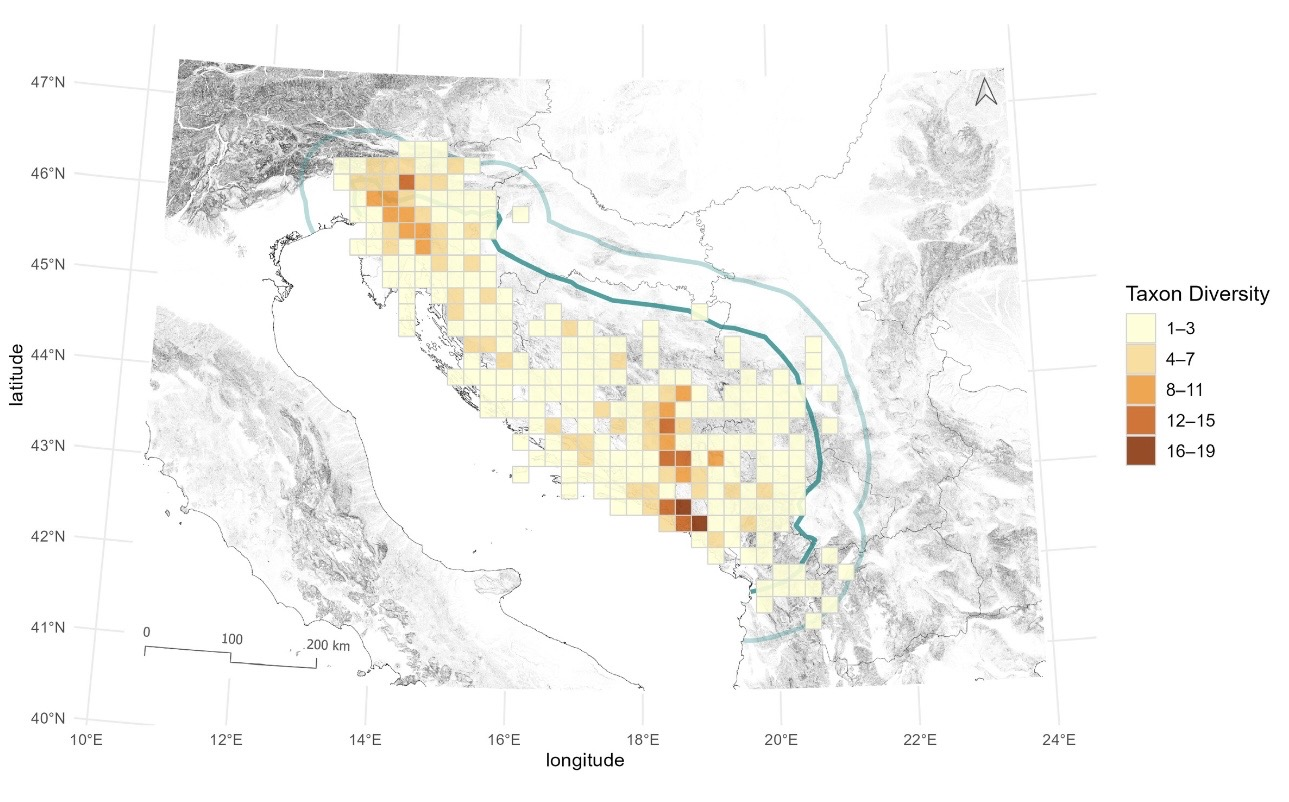
Montenegro is one of two and the main hotspot for troglobitic fauna in Western Balkans (though fragments of this hotspot reach into the easternmost tips of Croatia and Bosnia & Herzegovina). The other is in Slovenia, but the intensity there is far lower. It hosts over 280 endemic species, with more than 75 of them troglobiotic. At least 30 of these belong to Leptodirini beetles.

=== Phylum Annelida (segmented worms) ===
Name	Distribution
Class Clitellata (citellates)
Order Arhynchobdellida (proboscisless leeches)
Family Erpobdellidae
Dina crnogorensis Grosser & Pešić, 2022	Known only from its type locality : An unnamed spring near the Trešnjevik Mountain Pass in the Komovi Mountains (Andrijevica Municipality)
Dina nesemanni Grosser, Rewicz, Jovanović & Zawal, 2023	Known from two ponds : Blatina Pond near the village of Ćurilac (Danilovgrad Municipality) and an unnamed pond near the village of Bobovište (Bar Municipality)
Order Opisthopora
Family Lumbricidae (lumbricid earthworms)
Allolobophora ruzsai Zicsi, 1999	Known only from its type locality : An unnamed spring on the Sinjajevina Mountain (Šavnik and Mojkovac municipalities)
Dendrobaena bokakotorensis Šapkarev, 1975	Known localities include : Meadows near the village of Perast (Kotor Municipality) and Čakorna Jama Pit near the Čakor Mountain Pass (?) (Plav Municipality)
Dendrobaena durmitorensis Mršić, 1988	Known only from its type locality : Close to the Barno Lake near the town of Žabljak (Žabljak Municipality)
Dendrobaena montenegrina Mršić, 1988	Known only from its type locality : Close to the Black Lake near the town of Žabljak (Žabljak Municipality)
Dendrobaena zicsii Mršić, 1990	Known only from its type locality : Near the Čakor Mountain Pass (Plav Municipality)

=== Phylum Arthropoda (arthropods) ===
==== Subphylum Chelicerata (chelicerates) ====
Name	Distribution
Class Arachnida (arachnids)
Order Araneae (spiders)
Family Agelenidae (funnel weavers)
Histopona krivosijana	
Histopona petrovi	
Tegenaria bayeri	
Tegenaria gordani	
Family Dysderidae (woodlouse hunters)
Folkia mrazeki	
Rhode magnifica	
Stalagtia monospina	
Stalagtia skadarensis	
Family Hahniidae (dwarf sheet spiders)
Cryphoecina deelemanae	
Family Leptonetidae (cave spiders)
Barusia hofferi	
Sulcia armata	
Sulcia mirabilis	
Sulcia montenegrina	
Family Linyphiidae (sheet weavers)
Centromerus obenbergeri	
Sintula roeweri	
Troglohyphantes boudewijni	
Family Nesticidae (cave cobweb spiders)
Typhlonesticus absoloni	
Order Opiliones (harvestmen)
Family Nemastomatidae (nemastomatid harvestmen)
Nemaspela borkoae	
Family Sironidae (sironid harvestmen)
Cyphophthalmus gordani	
Cyphophthalmus martensi	
Cyphophthalmus montenegrinus	
Cyphophthalmus rumijae	
Cyphophthalmus zetae	
Order Pseudoscorpiones (pseudoscorpions)
Family Chthoniidae (chthoniid pseudoscorpions)
Chthonius globocicae	
Chthonius longimanus	
Chthonius medeonis	
Chthonius porevidi	
Chthonius prove	
Chthonius rhizon	
Family Neobisiidae (neobisiid pseudoscorpions)
Neobisium bozidarcurcici	
Neobisium davidbengurioni	
Neobisium marcchagalli	
Neobisium ninae	
Roncus belbogi	
Roncus davor	
Roncus golemanskyi	
Roncus hajnehaj	
Roncus hors	
Roncus negreae	
Roncus orao	
Roncus orjensis	
Roncus teutae	
Roncus yaginumai	
Order Scorpiones (scorpions)
Family Euscorpiidae (shorttail scorpions)
Euscorpius studentium	
Order Trombidiformes (trombidiform mites)
Family Athienemanniidae
Stygohydracarus karanovici	
Family Aturidae
Parabrachypoda mutila	
Family Chyzeriidae
Parawenhoekia seadi	
Family Erythraeidae
Abrolophus balkanicus	
Abrolophus montenegrinus	
Hauptmannia striata	
Family Eriophyidae (gall mites)
Aculus blagayanae	
Leipothrix menthae	
Family Hydryphantidae
Protzia durmitoris	
Trichothyas jadrankae	
Family Hygrobatidae
Atractides longisetus	
Hygrobates lacrima	
Family Microtrombidiidae
Porttrombidium milicae	
Family Myobiidae
Radfordia dinaromys	
Family Phytoptidae
Phytoptus alchemillae	
Family Torrenticolidae
Torrenticola graecula	
Family Trombidiidae (true velvet mites)
Allothrombium clavatum	

==== Subphylum Crustacea (crustaceans) ====
Name	Distribution
Class Copepoda (copepods)
Order Harpacticoida (harpacticoid copepods)
Family Leptopontiidae
Neoleptastacus huysi Karanovic, 2000	Known only from its type locality: Sandy beach on the Ada Bojana Island near the town of Ulcinj (Ulcinj Municipality)
Class Malacostraca (malacostracans)
Order Amphipoda (amphipods)
Family Niphargidae
Niphargus podgoricensis S. Karaman, 1934	Known only from its type locality : Ribnica River in the city of Podgorica (Podgorica Municipality)
Order Isopoda (isopods)
Family Porcellionidae (porcellionid woodlice)
Porcellio krivosijensis Strouhal, 1939	Strouhal (1939) listed its type locality as Western Montenegro. Current records are limited to the municipalities of Cetinje and Kotor, with the only precisely known locality being near the village of Čisto Polje (Cetinje Municipality)
Family Trichoniscidae
Cetinjella monasterii Karaman & Horvatović, 2018	Known only from its type locality : Cetinje Cave near the Cetinje Monastery in the town of Cetinje (Cetinje Municipality)
Order Mysida (opossum shrimps)
Family Mysidae
Diamysis lacustris Băcescu, 1940	Known from several localities in Lake Skadar : Lake waters near the village of Raduš (Bar Municipality), Vranjina Island and mouth of the Morača River (Podgorica Municipality)
Class Ostracoda (ostracods)
Order Podocopida
Family Candonidae
Candonopsis mareza Karanović & Petkovski, 1999	Known only from its type locality: Mareza Spring near the city of Podgorica (Podgorica Municipality)
Trajancandona natura Karanović, 1999	Known only from its type locality : Cetinje Cave near the Cetinje Monastery in the town of Cetinje (Cetinje Municipality)
Trajancandona particula Karanović, 1999	Known only from its type locality : Ground waters in the Šutinska Jama Sinkhole near the village of Beri (Podgorica Municipality)
Typhlocypris regisnikolai (Karanović & Petkovski, 1999)	Known only from its type locality: Small tributary of the Rijeka Crnojevića river near the village of Rijeka Crnojevića (?) (Cetinje Municipality)
Typhlocypris skadari Karanovic, 2005	Known only from its type locality : Unnamed well near the village of Golubovci (Podgorica Municipality)

==== Subphylum Hexapoda (hexapods) ====
Name	Distribution
Class Collembola (springtails)
Order Poduromorpha (plump springtails)
Family Neanuridae (short-legged springtails)
Bilobella mahunkai Dányi, 2010	Known only from its type locality : Leaf litter in the depression between Štirovnik and Jezerski Vrh peaks on Mount Lovćen (Cetinje Municipality)
Class Diplura (diplurans)
Family Campodeidae (slender entrophs)
Plusiocampa affinis Sendra & Antić, 2020	Known only from its type locality : Županjska Pećina Cave near the village of Lubnica (Berane Municipality)
Class Insecta (insects)
Order Archaeognatha (bristletails)
Family Machilidae (jumping bristletails)
Lepismachilis alexandrae Kaplin, 2018	Known only from its type locality : Pine forest near the town of Petrovac (Budva Municipality)
Order Blattodea (cockroaches and termites)
Family Ectobiidae (wood cockroaches)
Phyllodromica montenegrina Ingrisch & Pavićević, 2010	Known only from its type locality : Alpine meadow near the Bljuštirni Do Camp (Kolašin Municipality)
Order Coleoptera (beetles)
Family Byrrhidae (pill beetles)
Curimus montenegrinus Reitter, 1881	Know only from its type locality : Near the village of Ivanova Aluga (Cetinje Municipality)
Simplocaria montenegrina Obenberger, 1917	Known only from its type locality : Southern slope of Mount Maglić near Lake Trnovac (Plužine Municipality)
Family Cantharidae (soldier beetles)
Malthinus foliiformis Wittmer, 1975	Wittmer (1975) listed its type locality as Krivošije (?) (Kotor Municipality)
Malthodes hladili Švihla, 1980	Known only from its type locality : Forest near the town of Petrovac (Budva Municipality)
Malthodes szekessyi Wittmer, 1970	Known only from its type locality : Forest near the village of Podgora (Žabljak Municipality)
Podistra nonveilleri J. Müller, 1946	Müller (1946) listed its type locality as Komovi Mountains (?) (Andrijevica, Kolašin and Podgorica municipalities)
Rhagonycha complicans Dahlgren, 1979	Dahlgren (1979) listed its type locality as Morača Monastery (Kolašin Municipality)
Family Carabidae (ground beetles)
Acheroniotes mlejneki Lohaj & Lakota, 2010	Four localities known : Alexander the Great, Borova Jama 1, Borova Jama 2 and Snežna Jama pits on the Kamenik Mountain (Podgorica Municipality)
Adriaphaenops mlejneki Lohaj, Lakota, Quéinnec, Pavićević & Čeplík, 2016	Known localities include : Milići Snježnica Cave near the village of Medun, Prometheus Pit near the settlement of Katun Guzovalja and an unnamed pit both on the Šila Mountain (Podgorica Municipality)
Adriaphaenops njegosiensis Lohaj, Lakota, Quéinnec, Pavićević & Čeplík, 2016	Known only from its type locality : Cetinje Cave near the Cetinje Monastery in the town of Cetinje (Cetinje Municipality)
Adriaphaenops petrimaris Lohaj & Delić, 2019	Known only from its type locality : Cave Pištet 4 (PT4) near the Komnenova Glavica Peak (Cetinje Municipality)
Adriaphaenops rumijaensis Lohaj, Lakota, Quéinnec, Pavićević & Čeplík, 2016	Known only from its type locality : Phoenix Pit on Mount Rumija (Bar Municipality)
Adriaphaenops staudacheri (Scheibel, 1939)	Known only from its type locality : Grbočica Pećina Cave near the village of Trnovo (Bar Municipality)
Adriaphaenops stirni (Pretner, 1959)	Known only from its type locality : Velja Pećina Cave near the Tsar’s Bridge (Niksić Municipality)
Adriaphaenops zupcense (Pavićević, 1990)	Two localities known : Pećina u Zupcima Cave near the Zupci Rock Formation and Jama na Vjetrenim Brdima Pit near the Vjetrena Brda Peak both in the Durmitor Mountains (Žabljak Municipality)
Deltomerus malissorum Apfelbeck, 1918	Two localities known : Near the village of Vusanje in the Prokletje Mountains (Gusinje Municipality) and in the Komovi Mountains (?) (Andrijevica, Kolašin and Podgorica municipalities)
Duvalius droveniki Magrini, 1998	Known only from its type locality : Near the Hajla Peak in the Prokletje Mountains (Rožaje Municipality)
Duvalius durmitorensis (Apfelbeck, 1904)	Known localities include : Forest near the Bendovac Peak in the Bjelasica Mountains (Kolašin Municipality) and several sinkholes near the around Veliki Štuoc Peak in the Durmitor Mountains (Žabljak Municipality)
Duvalius gejzadunayi Lohaj, Čeplík & Lakota, 2013	Known only from its type locality: Pećina u Dubokom Potoku Cave near the village of Donje Biševo (Rožaje Municipality)
Minosaphaenops ollivieri Quéinnec, 2008	Two localities known : Ericova Jama Pit near the village of Crkvice (?) (Kotor Municipality) and Jasenovska Jama Pit near the village of Jasenov Do both in the Orjen Mountains (?) (Herceg Novi Municipality)
Neotrechus terrenus Knirsch, 1929	Knirsch (1929) listed its type locality as Montenegro (Herzegovina). Nowadays this area lies in Herceg Novi, Nikšić, Pljevlja, Plužine, Šavnik and Žabljak municipalities
Omphreus bjelasicensis Ćurčić, Waitzbauer, Zolda, Brajković, Dimitrijević, Ilić & Ćurčić, 2008	Known only from its type locality : Forest near the village of Dolovi Lalevića (Mojkovac Municipality)
Omphreus prekornicensis Ćurčić, Waitzbauer, Zolda, Brajković, Dimitrijević, Ilić & Ćurčić, 2008	Ćurčić et al. (2008) listed its type locality as Prekornica Mountain, village of Jugovići (Danilovgrad and Nikšić municipalities)
Omphreus wohlberedti Winkler, 1933	Winkler (1933) listed its type locality as Virpazar (Bar Municipality)
Orcusiella prokletijensis Pavićević, Lohaj & Popović, 2020	Known only from its type locality: Jama Kolektor Pit near the Maja Kolata Peak in the Prokletje Mountains (Gusinje Municipality)
Pterostichus walteri Reitter, 1883	Reitter (1883) listed its type locality as Montenegro, mountains close to the Dalmatian border. Nowadays, this area is situated in the region adjacent to the Croatian border, like the municipalities of Herceg Novi, Nikšić, or Cetinje
Reicheadella lakotai Magrini & Bulirsch, 2005	Magrini & Bulirsch (2005) listed its type locality as Mount Lovćen near Kotor (Kotor Municipality)
Scotoplanetes aquacultor Lakota, Lohaj & Dunay, 2010	Known only from its type locality : Vodna Jama Pit on the Dragaljsko Polje Field (Kotor Municipality)
Scotoplanetes nonveilleri Pavićević & Popović, 2023	Known only from its type locality : Jama u Vjetrenim Brdima Pit near the Vjetrena Brda Peak in the Durmitor Mountains (Žabljak Municipality)
Winklerites durmitorensis Nonveiller & Pavićević, 1987	Known only from its type locality : Near the village of Đurđevića Tara (Pljevlja Municipality)
Winklerites kuciniensis Nonveiller & Pavićević, 1987	Nonveiller & Pavićević (1987) listed its type locality as Komovi Mountains (?) (Andrijevica, Kolašin and Podgorica municipalities)
Family Curculionidae (true weevils)
Amaurorhinus dalmatinus Folwaczny, 1972	Folwaczny (1972) listed its type locality as Herceg Novi
Brachysomus mucronatus Yunakov, 2006	Two localities known : Near the towns of Dobrota and Kotor (Kotor Municipality)
Brachysomus subtilis Yunakov, 2006	Two localities known : Near the towns of Dobrota and Kotor (Kotor Municipality)
Echinodera bryneryi Germann, Braunert & Schütte, 2022	Three localities known : Forests near the village of Međureč, in the Brdela depression (Ulcinj Municipality) and near the Potok Dumezica Stream (Bar Municipality)
Echinodera peneckei Stüben, 1998	Stüben (1998) listed its type locality as Herceg Novi
Echinodera romanboroveci Stüben, 1998	Known only from its type locality : Forest near the village of Sutomore, though unidentified specimens thought to be this species were collected near the villages of Bukovik (Bar Municipality) and Buljarica (Budva Municipality)
Leiosoma komovicum Pedroni, 2018	Two localities known : Leaf litter between flowering wood anemone (Anemonoides nemorosa) and blue anemone (Anemonoides apennina) near the Brdeljak Peak (Šavnik Municipality) and mixed spruce (Picea) and beech (Fagus) forest southeast of he village of Mateševo (Kolašin Municipality)
Otiorhynchus galteri Apfelbeck, 1918	Known only from its type locality : Near the Maja e Podgojs Peak in the Prokletje Mountains (Gusinje Municipality)
Otiorhynchus retifer Apfelbeck, 1928	Apfelbeck (1918) listed its type locality as Durmitor Mountains (?) (Žabljak Municipality)
Phyllobius rochati Pesarini, 1981	Known only from its type locality : Forest on the shore of Lake Biograd (Kolašin Municipality)
Sciaphobus formaneki (Apfelbeck, 1922)	Two localities known : Forests near the village of Sutomore (Bar Municipality) and in the region of Krivošije (?) (Kotor Municipality)
Sciaphobus paliuri Apfelbeck, 1908	Known only from its type locality : Forest near the town of Virpazar (Bar Municipality)
Sciaphobus pelikani Apfelbeck, 1922	Two localities known : Limestone rocks near the villages of Štegvaša (Bar Municipality) and Brajše (Ulcinj Municipality), though it may also be present in Croatia with an unconfirmed record from the village of Lovorno
Sciaphobus polydrosinus Apfelbeck, 1922	Apfelbeck (1922) listed the collection localities as near the town of Cetinje and near the river (probably referring to the Rijeka Crnojevića River) (Cetinje Municipality)
Tropiphorus albanicus Apfelbeck, 1928	Known only from its type locality : Near the Qafa Borit Peak in the Prokletje Mountains (Gusinje Municipality)
Family Elateridae (click beetles)
Adrastus montenegroensis Laibner, 1987	Known only from its type locality : Near the village of Sutomore (Bar Municipality)
Athous cingulatus L. Miller, 1881	Two localities known : Near the town of Kotor (Kotor Municipality) and the village of Zelenika (Herceg Novi Municipality)
Dima marvani Mertlik, Németh & Kundrata, 2017	Two localities known : Forests near the villages of Njeguši (Cetinje Municipality) and Virpazar (Bar Municipality)
Family Hydraenidae (minute moss beetles)
Hydraena biltoni Jäch & Díaz, 2012	Known localities include : Komarnica and Bukovica rivers (Šavnik Municipality) and several springs near Lake Biograd (Kolašin Municipality) and Black Lake (Žabljak Municipality)
Hydraena dinarica Freitag, de Vries, Paterno, Maestri, Delledonne, Thompson, Lamed, Lambert, Fox, Gonzalez, Delocado, Sabordo, Pangantihon & Njunjić, 2021	Known localities include : Skalala Stream in the Sušica Canyon and Lake Zeleni Vir (Žabljak Municipality)
Ochthebius insidiosus Jäch, 1999	Jäch (1999) listed its type locality as the river between Podgorica and Cetinje (probably referring to the Rijeka Crnojevića River)
Ochthebius pretneri Jäch, 1999	Jäch (1999) listed its type locality as Skakavac Stream (probably referring to the stream feeding the Skakavica Waterfall) (Šanvik Municipality)
Family Lampyridae (fireflies)
Luciola novaki J. Müller, 1946 (Black-legged Firefly)	Following its description, the species was known only from its holotype collected in the Bar Municipality for more than 60 years. The absence of new records led to concerns about its possible extinction. However, its known range has since expanded significantly within Montenegro since 2013, with known localities in the villages of Burtaiši, Donji Štoj, and Virpazar (Bar Municipality), at the Ulcinj Salina Salt Plain, along the shores of the Bojana River, and in marshes on Bojana Island (Ulcinj Municipality). Importantly, a dedicated 2022 survey (the results of which are not yet published) successfully confirmed its presence in Albania for the first time, with specimens located near the Bojana River and in the marshes and along the shores of southern Lake Skadar on the Albanian side.
Family Leiodidae (round fungus beetles)
Anillocharis tenuilimbata Jeannel, 1934	Two localities known : Ljutska Pećina Cave on the Šejtan Kula Mountain (Pljevlja Municipality) and Zapadna Sniježica na Manitoj Gori Cave near the Treštenik Peak (Plužine Municipality)
Anthroherpon cecai Njunjić, Perreau & Pavićević, 2015	Known only from its type locality : Crna Jama (=Jama u Podu) Pit near the village of Mala Crna Gora (Žabljak Municipality)
Anthroherpon gueorguievi (Giachino & Vailati, 2005)	Known only from its type locality : Dukova Ledenica Cave near the village of Bajovo Polje (Plužine Municipality)
Anthroherpon matzenaueri (Apfelbeck, 1907)	Known from more than twenty caves across Herceg Novi, Nikšić, Kolašin, Plužine, Pljevlja, Šavnik and Danilovgrad municipalities
Anthroherpon piesbergeni (Zariquiey, 1927)	Four localities known : Bezdan Jama Pit near the village of Gornji Vršanj (?), Dvogrlica Jama Pit between the villages of Žanjev Do and Njeguši (?) (Cetinje Municipality), Brankova Jama Pit near the village of Podbožur (?) and Manja Pećina Cave near the village of Rudine (?) (Nikšić Municipality)
Anthroherpon sinjajevina Njunjić, Perreau & Pavićević, 2015	Known only from its type locality : Blažova Pećina Cave near the village of Rudanca (Mojkovac Municipality)
Anthroherpon udrzali (Giachino & Vailati, 2005)	Known only from its type locality : Pećina u Kučericama Cave in the Orjen Mountains (Herceg Novi Municipality)
Anthroherpon zariquieyi (Jeannel, 1930)	Four localities known : Vodena Pećina Cave near the Vodeni Do Viewpoint (Šavnik Municipality), Vodena pećina u Vodenom dolu in the Komarskij Kraj Area, Jama na Vjetrenim Brdima Pit near the Vjetreno Brdo Peak, Pećina u Zupcima and Pećina u Sedlenoj Gredi caves near the Sedlena Greda Mountain (Žabljak Municipality)
Antrodulus aequibasalis Knirsch, 1929	Knirsch (1929) listed its type locality as Montenegro (Herzegovina). Nowadays this area lies in Herceg Novi, Nikšić, Pljevlja, Plužine, Šavnik, and Žabljak municipalities
Bathyscidius crnagorensis (Fresneda, Giachino, Salgado, Faille, Bourdeau, Cieslak & Ribera, 2024)	Fresneda et al. (2024) listed its type locality as Mount Lovćen (Cetinje Municipality)
Bathyscidius mikati (Udržal, 1995)	Four localities known : Leaf litter near the village of Sutomore and Phoenix, Ice Virgin and Little Virgin pits on Mount Rumija (Bar Municipality)
Bathyscidius orjensis (Polak & Jalžić, 2019)	Known only from its type locality : Soil in the village of Kruševice (Herceg Novi Municipality)
Blattochaeta brankojalzici Čeplík, Lakota & Čeplík, 2021	Known only from its type locality : Blažova Cave near the village of Rudanca (Mojkovac Municipality)
Blattochaeta hawelkai Knirsch, 1929	Four localities known : Pećina u Crtovom Dola Cave, Jama duboka u Bijelom Dola Pit (?), Bijeli Dol Jama Pit (?) (Plužine Municipality) and an unnamed cave all in the Ledenice Mountains (Mojkovac Municipality)
Blattochaeta montenegrina Jeannel, 1930	Five localities known : Ledenica Ispod Lipske Ploče on Mount Lovćen (?), Donja Mora Jama Pit near the village of Dugi Do, Boljanovica Jama Pit near the village of Rajičevići, Vranovska Jama Pit near the Lisija Ploča Peak (Cetinje Municipality) and Mala Jama na Droškorici Pit (Nikšić Municipality) both on the Droškorica Mountain
Blattochaeta peterhlavaci Čeplík, Lakota & Čeplík, 2021	Three localities known : Phoenix, White Virgin and Little Virgin pits on Mount Rumija (Bar Municipality)
Blattochaeta remyi Jeannel, 1931	Known only from its type locality : Županska Pećina Cave near the village of Lubnice (Berane Municipality)
Euconnus arabiae Alonso-Zarazaga, 2004	Alonso-Zarazaga (2004) listed its type locality as Cetinje
Euconnus montenigrinus Karaman, 1973	Karaman (1973) listed its type locality as Cetinje
Euconnus nikitanus Reitter, 1881	Know only from its type locality : Mount Radoštak (?) (Herceg Novi Municipality)
Euconnus njegosi Karaman, 1973	Karaman (1973) listed its type locality as Njeguši (Cetinje Municipality)
Graciliella absoloni (V. B. Guéorguiev, 1990)	Known only from its type locality : Lipa Cave near the village of Lipa (Cetinje Municipality)
Hadesia weiratheri Zariquiey, 1927	Four localities known : Dobra Pećina Cave near the Lisac Peak, Vojvode Dakovića Pećina Cave in the Grahovsko Polje Field (Nikšić Municipality), Vodena Jama Sinkhole on the Dragaljsko Polje Field and Duboka Jama Pit near the village of Knežlaz (Kotor Municipality)
Hadesia zetae Polak, Delić, Kostanjšek & Trontelj, 2016	Known only from its type locality : Lipa Cave near the village of Lipa (Cetinje Municipality)
Laneyriella andrijevicensis (Jeannel, 1924)	Known localities include : Velika Bracanovića Cave near the village of Lubnice and Županjska Cave near the settlement of Katun (Berane Municipality), near the Zulevo Brdo Peak and the town of Andrijevica (Andrijevica Municipality), near the village of Komadine (Bijelo Polje Municipality) and in the Lake Biograd area (Kolašin Municipality)
Laneyriella ganglbaueri (Apfelbeck, 1907)	Known only from its type locality : Mala Pećina Cave above the village of Muo (Kotor Municipality)
Laneyriella matchai (Jeannel, 1924)	Known localities include : Knezlaz Cave near the village of Crkvice, Gornja Pokljuka Jama Cave near the Gradac Peak, Duboka Jama Cave near the village of Prodoli, unnamed cave near the village of Veli Do, Jankova Cave near the Jankovo Selo (Kotor Municipality)
Laneyriella stussineri (J. Müller, 1914)	Müller (1914) listed its type locality as Cetinje
Leonhardella montenegrina Jeannel, 1948	Known only from its type locality : Jama u Smrekovcu (=Gjorjo Pećina Cave ) on Mount Bioč (Plužine Municipality)
Leonhardella roseni J. Müller, 1937	Known from several caves on the Ledenice Mountain (Mojkovac Municipality)
Speonesiotes brachycerus Jeannel, 1924	Jeannel (1924) listed its type locality as Krivošije (Kotor Municipality)
Speonesiotes huemmleri Jeannel, 1924	Jeannel (1924) listed its type locality as Krivošije (Kotor Municipality)
Speonesiotes laticollis J. Müller, 1934	Known only from its type locality : Megara Cave near the village of Tološi (Podgorica Municipality)
Speonesiotes matchai Fagniez, 1922	Known from several caves in the Krivošije Area (Kotor Municipality) and two caves near the village of Crkvice (Kotor Municipality)
Speonesiotes montenegrinus Karaman, 1967	Known only from its type locality : Megara Cave near the village of Tološi (Podgorica Municipality)
Speonesiotes pretneri J. Müller, 1934	Three localities known : Megara Cave near the village of Tološi, Golupska Pećina Cave and Jama na Otoku Vranjina Pit both on the Vranjina Island (Podgorica Municipality)
Speonesiotes reissi Zariquiey, 1927	Two localities known : Unnamed cave and Mala pećina Cave near the villages of Fundina and Medun respectively (Podgorica Municipality)
Speonesiotes scutariensis G. Müller, 1934	Known from several caves near the villages of Gornja and Donja Seoca and Limska Kapa Pećina Cave near the village of Limljani (Bar Municipality)
Tartariella durmitorensis Nonveiller & Pavićević, 1999	Two localities known : Jama na Vjetrenim Brdima Pit and Zelenivirska Pećina Cave near the Vjetrena Brda Peak in the Durmitor Mountains (Žabljak Municipality)
Weiratheria bocki Zariquiey, 1927	Known only from its type locality : Unnamed cave near the village of Korita (Podgorica Municipality)
Family Nitidulidae (sap beetles)
Meligethes cooteri Audisio, 1999	Known only from its type locality : On the Yellow Betony (Stachys alopecuros=Betonica alopecuros) near the Mali Međed Peak in the Durmitor Mountains (Žabljak Municipality)
Meligethes mirae Audisio, Jelínek & Stevanović, 1999	Known only from its type locality : On the Rock Thyme (Calamintha alpina=Clinopodium alpinum) near the Savin Kuk Peak in the Durmitor Mountains (Žabljak Municipality)
Family Staphylinidae (rove beetles)
Aloconota montenegrina (Bernhauer, 1899)	Bernhauer (1899) listed its type locality as Podgorica
Atheta puellaris Bernhauer, 1899	Bernhauer (1899) listed its type locality as Herceg Novi
Anthophagus durmitorensis Coiffait, 1980	Coiffait (1980) listed its type locality as Ališnica, Durmitor Mountains (probably referring to the Gornja Ališnica Valley) (Zabljak Municipality)
Bryaxis biogradensis Kolimar, Hlaváč & Baňař, 2024	Known only from its type locality : Leaf litter in a mixed beech (Fagus) and fir (Abies) forest near Lake Biograd (Kolašin Municipality)
Bryaxis callipus (Apfelbeck, 1906)	Apfelbeck (1906) listed its type locality as Mount Radoštak (Herceg Novi Municipality)
Bryaxis cetinjensis (Apfelbeck, 1906)	Apfelbeck (1906) listed its type locality as Cetinje
Bryaxis duboki Kolimar, Hlaváč & Baňař, 2024	Known localities include : Forest floor near the villages of Međurečje and Crkvine (Kolašin Municipality) and under stones in Grebaje and Ropojana valleys (Gusinje Municipality)
Bryaxis melinensis (Reitter, 1881)	Reitter (1881) listed two known localities : Herceg Novi and Budva
Bryaxis tuberculiceps Nonveiller, Pavićević & Besuchet, 2003	Known only from its type locality : Maksima Jama Pit near the village of Knežlaz (Kotor Municipality)
Cephennium dalmatinum Machulka, 1932	Machulka (1932) listed two localities : Mount Lovćen (Cetinje Municipality) and Kameno (Herceg Novi Municipality)
Cephennium mlejneki Stevanović, 2014	Known only from its type locality : Mount Rumija near the town Virpazar (Bar Municipality)
Cephennium rubidum Stevanović, 2011	Two localities known : Near the village of Šljivansko (Pljevlja Municipality) and in the Biogradska Gora National Park (?) (Kolašin Municipality)
Cyrtotyphlus kaiseri (Pace, 1983)	Known only from its type locality : Near the village of Begovići (Herceg Novi Municipality)
Geostiba spizzana (Bernhauer, 1931)	Bernhauer (1931) listed its type locality as Sutomore (Bar Municipality)
Lathrobium nonveilleri Coiffait, 1980	Known only from its type locality : Forest floor near the Black Lake (Žabljak Municipality)
Leptusa durmitorensis Pace, 1984	Known only from its type locality : Near the Jakšića Mlin Watermill (?) (Žabljak Municipality)
Leptusa hopffgarteni (Reitter, 1881)	Reitter (1881) listed its type locality as Herceg Novi
Leptusa nonveilleri Pace, 1984	Known only from its type locality : Forest floor near the Black Lake (Žabljak Municipality)
Liogluta ljubicnaensis (Linke, 1938)	Linke (1938) listed its type locality as Ljubišnja Mountains (Pljevlja Municipality)
Neuraphes setifer Apfelbeck, 1918	Apfelbeck (1918) listed its type locality as Cetinje
Nonveilleria lepida Pavićević & Besuchet, 2003	Known only from its type locality : Small cave above Velja Pećina Cave near the village of Seoštica (Podgorica Municipality)
Oxypoda weiratheri Bernhauer, 1928	Known only from its type locality : Mount Bioč (Plužine Municipality)
Paramaurops kaufmanni (Ganglbauer, 1895)	Ganglbauer (1895) listed its type locality as Herceg Novi. It has also recorded near the Popov Vrh Peak (Kotor Municipality)
Paramaurops montenegrinus Bekchiev & Hlaváč, 2020	Known only from its type locality : An unnamed cave approximately 12 km east of Nikšić (probably near the village of Oblatno) (Nikšić Municipality)
Pseudamaurops calcaratus Nonveiller & Pavićević, 2003	Known only from its type locality : Golubinja Pećina Cave near the village of Gornja Seoca (Bar Municipality)
Pygoxyon neuraphiiforme Reitter, 1913	Reitter (1913) liste fits type locality as Topla, Herceg Novi (Herceg Novi Municipality)
Pygoxyon sturanyi Apfelbeck, 1905	Apfelbeck (1905) listed two localities Njeguši (Cetinje Municipality) and Krivošije (Kotor Municipality)
Pygoxyon zellichi Ganglbauer, 1902	Known only from its type locality : Near the village of Crkvice (Kotor Municipality)
Quedius crnagoricus Coiffait, 1980	Known only from its type locality : Near the Čakor Mountain Pass (Plav Municipality)
Rozajella deelemani Perreau & Pavićević, 2008	Known only from its type locality : Građa Pećina Cave near the village of Petnjik (Berane Municipality)
Rozajella jovanvladimiri Ćurčić, Brajković, Ćurčić & Waitzbauer, 2007	Known only from its type locality : Pećina u Dubokom Potoku Cave near the village of Donje Biševo (Rožaje Municipality)
Rozajella madzgalji Njunjić, Schilthuizen, Pavićević & Perreau, 2017	Known localities include : Mala Pećina u Garaškom Kršu and Velika Pećina u Garaškom Kršu caves near the village of Goražde (Berane Municipality)
Scydmoraphes dalmatinus Machulka, 1930	Machulka (1930) listed its type locality as Herceg Novi
Scydmoraphes sulcipennis (Reitter, 1881)	Reitter (1881) listed its distribution as Dalmatia, Herzegovina and western Montenegro. Nowadays, this area lies in the Herceg Novi, Kotor, Tivat, Nikšić, Pljevlja, Plužine, Šavnik and Žabljak municipalities
Seracamaurops cvorovici Hlaváč, Brachat & Delić, 2025	Known only from its type locality : Studena Pećina Cave near the village of Mokro (Šavnik Municipality)
Seracamaurops delici Lohaj, Pavićević & Lakota, 2023	Known localities include : Opasna Jama Pit near the village of Korito and C-95 Cave in the Kuči Mountains (Podgorica Municipality)
Seracamaurops fodori (Székessy, 1943)	Known only from its type locality : Riđani Cave near the village of Riđani (Nikšić Municipality)
Seracamaurops fritschi Besuchet, 1986	Known only from its type locality : Boljanovica Pit not far from the village of Njeguši (?) (Cetinje Municipality)
Seracamaurops ognjenovici Pavićević, Hlaváč & Lakota, 2008	Known only from its type locality : Brankova Jama Pit near the village of Rudine (Nikšić Municipality)
Seracamaurops perovici Pavićević, Njunjić & Plećaš, 2013	Six localities known : Prljača Pećina Cave, Jama u Katunu Pit, Jama pod Prijenkom Pit all near the village of Donje Čarađe, Lazareva Pećina and Vodena Pećina caves near the village of Jasikovica and Stozi Pećina (=Stoška Pećina) Cave near the village of Golijski Stozi (Nikšić Municipality)
Seracamaurops perreaui Nonveiller & Pavićević, 2008	Known only from its type locality : Bukavica Pećina Cave near the village of Knežlaz (Kotor Municipality)
Seracamaurops rumijaensis Lohaj, Pavićević & Lakota, 2023	Two localities known : Phoenix and Ice Virgin pits on Mount Rumija (Bar Municipality)
Stenus montenegrinus Puthz, 1972	Known only from its type locality : Near the village of Ubli (Cetinje Municipality)
Stenus paganettianus Bernhauer, 1929	Bernhauer (1929) listed its type locality as Herceg Novi
Family Zopheridae (ironclad beetles)
Langelandia reflexipennis Reitter, 1912	Reitter (1912) listed its type locality as Herceg Novi
Order Diptera (flies)
Family Syrphidae (flower flies)
Eumerus incisus Malidžan, Grković, Kočiš Tubić, Radenković & Vujić, 2022	Known from Orjen (?) and Lovćen (?) mountains
Merodon luteomaculatus Vujić, Radenković & Šašić, 2018	Known localities include : Several localities in the Orjen Mountains and near the villages of Morinj (Herceg Novi Municipality) and Komarnica (Šavnik Municipality). It may also be present in Bosnia and Herzegovina (near the village of Krupac). However, this record is based solely on a paratype specimen collected in 1911 and has not been confirmed by recent observations
Merodon orjensis Vujić, Radenković & Šašić, 2018	Known only from its type locality: Near the village of Crkvice in the Orjen Mountains (Kotor Municipality)
Order Hemiptera (true bugs)
Family Issidae (issid planthoppers)
Issus montenegrus Gnezdilov, 2017	Four localities known : Near the villages of Dobrsko Selo, Lipa (Cetinje Municipality) and Mratinje (Plužine Municipality), as well as near the Jezerski Vrh Peak (?) on Mount Lovćen
Order Hymenoptera (sawflies, wasps, bees, ants and allies)
Family Formicidae (ants)
Crematogaster montenigrinus Karaman, 2008	Two localities known : Town of Donja Lastva (Tivat Municipality) and near the west mouth of Bojana River (Ulcinj Municipality). Karaman (2008) noted that this species is exceptionally rare
Order Lepidoptera (butterflies and moths)
Family Gelechiidae (twirler moths)
Caryocolum srnkai Huemer & Karsholt, 2011	Four localities known : Near the villages of Vrela, Virak and Ivan Do (Žabljak Municipality), as well as near the Sedlo Mountain Pass in the Durmitor Mountains
Sattleria dinarica Huemer, 2014	Known only from its type locality : Velika Kalica Valley in the Durmitor Mountains (Žabljak Municipality)
Order Orthoptera (grasshoppers, crickets, katydids, and allies)
Family Acrididae (short-horned grasshoppers)
Miramella demissa Mulder, 2023	Known localities include : Near the villages of Gornja Klezna, Gornja Briska, Bijelo Polje, Godinje and more than a dozen localities near the village of Virpazar. On Mount Sutorman, in the Orahovštica Valley (Bar Municipality) and near the villages of Poseljani (Cetinje Municipality), Donji Štoj (Ulcinj Municipality) and Buljarica (Budva Municipality)
Family Tettigoniidae (katydids and bush crickets)
Pachytrachis tumidus Ingrisch & Pavićević, 2010 (Durmitor Bush-cricket)	Known from several localities in the village of Komarnica (Šavnik Municipality)
Poecilimon albolineatus Ingrisch & Pavićević, 2010 (White-lined Bright Bush-cricket)	Known localities include : Near the villages of Donja Brezna (Plužine Municipality), Brskut (Podgorica Municipality), Boričje and Trsa (Plužine Municipality) and near the Mausoleum of Njegoš (Cetinje Municipality)
Poecilimon nonveilleri Ingrisch & Pavićević, 2010 (Nonveiller’s Bright Bush-Cricket)	Known from several localities in Sušica and Tara River canyons (Žabljak Municipality), near Vasojevićki Kom Peak in the Komovi Mountains (Andrijevica Municipality), near the Prutaš Mountain (Plužine Municipality)
Order Plecoptera (stoneflies)
Family Leuctridae (rolled-winged stoneflies)
Leuctra visitor Murányi & Kovács, 2024	Known from several springs near the Tatarija Ridge on Mount Visitor (Plav Municipality)

==== Subphylum Myriapoda (myriapods) ====
Name	Distribution
Class Diplopoda (millipedes)
Order Chordeumatida (sausage millipedes)
Family Anthogonidae
Macrochaetosoma bertiscea Antić, Dražina, Rađa, Tomić & Makarov, 2015	Two localities known : Gorniča Pit near the village of Vusanje in the Prokletje Mountains (Gusinje Municipality), and Jama Od Karimana Pit in the Kuči Mountains (?) (Andrijevica and Kolašin municipalities)
Family Haaseidae
Haasea lacusnigri (Gulička, 1968)	Gulička (1968) listed its type locality as European spruce forest in the Durmitor Mountains
Family Heterolatzeliidae
Heterolatzelia durmitorensis Makarov, Ćurčić, Tomić, Rađa, Rađa, Ćurčić, Mitić & Lučić, 2011	Three localities known : Stozi Cave near the village of Golijski Stozi, Crnogorska Jama Cave near the village of Višnjića Do (Nikšić Municipality), and the Black Lake area near the village of Ivan Do (?) (Žabljak Municipality)
Order Julida (snake millipedes)
Family Julidae
Leptoiulus durmitorius (Attems, 1927)	Known only from its type locality : Forest near the village of Međurečje (?) (Kolašin Municipality)

=== Phylum Chordata (chordates) ===
Name	Distribution / Notes
Class Actinopterygii (ray-finned fishes)
Order Cypriniformes (minnows, suckers, carps, and loaches)
Family Nemacheilidae (stone loaches)
Barbatula zetensis (Šorić, 2000) (Zeta Stone Loach)	Zeta, Rijeka Crnojevića, Morača and lower Cijevna rivers
Family Leuciscidae (true minnows)
Leucos albus (Marić, 2010) (White Roach)	Endemic to the Lake Skadar/Shkodër basin (Rijeka Crnojevića and Morača rivers)
Order Gobiiformes (gobies, cardinalfishes, and allies)
Family Gobiidae (gobies)
Ninnigobius montenegrensis (Miller & Šanda, 2008) (Skadar Goby)	Endemic to the coastal and brackish waters around Lake Skadar
Knipowitschia montenegrina Kovačić & Šanda, 2007 (Montenegro Dwarf Goby)	Endemic to the lower Morača River basin
Order Salmoniformes (salmons, pikes and mudminnows)
Family Salmonidae (salmons, trouts, and whitefishes)
Salmo taleri (Karaman, 1933) (Nikšić Trout)	Endemic to the upper Zeta River basin

=== Phylum Gastrotricha (gastrotrichs) ===
Name	Distribution
Order Chaetonotida
Family Chaetonotidae
Chaetonotus antrumus Kolicka, Gadawski & Dąbért, 2017	Known only from its type locality : Obod Cave near the village of Rijeka Crnojevića (Cetinje Municipality)

=== Phylum Mollusca (molluscs) ===
Name	Distribution
Class Gastropoda (snails and slugs)
Order Architaenioglossa (apple snails, river snails and allies)
Family Aciculidae(needle snails)
Acicula miaphene Subai, 2009	Known only from its type locality : Near the village of Mokrine (Herceg Novi Municipality)
Family Cochlostomatidae
Cochlostoma dalmatinum (L. Pfeiffer, 1846)	Known only from its type locality : On the Mount Radoštak area near the village of Žlijebi (Herceg Novi Municipality)
Cochlostoma erika Zallot, Fehér, Bamberger & Gittenberger, 2018	Known localities include : Popovo (Pljevlja Municipality) and Duboki Do (Cetinje Municipality) caves
Cochlostoma pallgergelyi Zallot, Kamchev, Schilthuizen, Fehér, De Mattia & Gittenberger, 2024	Known from two localities : near the village of Kameno (Herceg Novi Municipality) and near Lovćen Peak (Cetinje Municipality)
Order Ellobiida (hollow-shelled, ear-shelled and button snails)
Family Ellobiidae (hollow-shelled snails)
Zospeum dubokidoense Jochum, Michalik, Inäbnit & Kneubühler, 2024	Known only from its type locality : Duboki Do Cave (Cetinje Municipality)
Zospeum intermedium Jochum, Michalik, Inäbnit & Kneubühler, 2024	Known only from its type locality : Cetinje Cave near the Cetinje Monastery in the town of Cetinje (Cetinje Municipality)
Zospeum kolbae Jochum, Michalik, Inäbnit & Kneubühler, 2024	Known only from its type locality : St John’s Cave near the village of Njeguši (Cetinje Municipality)
Zospeum njegusiense Jochum, Michalik, Inäbnit & Kneubühler, 2024	Known only from its type locality : St John’s Cave near the village of Njeguši (Cetinje Municipality)
Zospeum njunjicae Jochum, Michalik, Inäbnit & Kneubühler, 2024	Known only from its type locality : Golubova Cave near the village of Gornja Seoca (Bar Municipality)
Zospeum tortuosum Jochum, Michalik, Inäbnit & Kneubühler, 2024	Known only from its type locality : Cetinje Cave near the Cetinje Monastery in the town of Cetinje (Cetinje Municipality)
Zospeum tumidum Jochum, Michalik, Inäbnit & Kneubühler, 2024	Known only from its type locality : Ðokova Cave near the village of Bajovo Polje (Plužine Municipality)
Order Littorinimorpha
Family Bythinellidae
Bythinella luteola Radoman, 1976	Known from the drainage areas of the rivers Tara, Lim and upper part of Morača River Valley
Bythinella taraensis Glöer & Pešić, 2010	Known from two localities in the Tara River Canyon : Ljevok Stream (Mojkovac Municipality) and an unnamed spring in the village of Polje (Žabljak Municipality)
Family Hydrobiidae (mud snails)
Anagastina gluhodolica (Radoman, 1973)	Known only from its type locality : Velje Oko Spring near the village of Gluhi Do (Bar Municipality)
Anagastina matjasici (Radoman, 1973)	Known only from the type locality : an unnamed spring near the village of Lipovik (Cetinje Municipality)
Anagastina vidrovani (Radoman, 1973)	Known from many springs in the area of Nikšićko polje, in the villages like Uzduh, Glibavac (Nikšić Municipality) and Rastoci (Kolašin Municipality) as well as in the basin of Lake Skadar (Bar, Cetinje and Zeta Municipalities)
Bithynia radomani Glöer & Pešić, 2007	Known localities include : Vranjina Island (Zeta Municipality) and the town of Virpazar (Bar Municipality)
Bithynia skadarskii Glöer & Pešić, 2007	Known localities include : Kamenik Island (?) and several springs in the villages of Karuč (Cetinje Municipality) and Vranjina (Zeta Municipality)
Bithynia zeta Glöer & Pešić, 2007	Known localities include : Lake Gornje Malo Blato (Podgorica and Cetinje Municipalities), Vranjina Island (Zeta Municipality) and springs in the villages of Karuč (Cetinje Municipality) and Gornje Vrelo (Bar Municipality)
Bracenica spiridoni (Radoman, 1973)	Known localities include : Spirov Spring near the village of Braćeni (Bar Municipality) and an unnamed spring in the village of Karuč (Cetinje Municipality)
Bracenica vitojaensis Glöer, Grego, Erőss & Fehér, 2015	Known only from its type locality: Vitoja Spring in the Drume area (Tuzi Municipality)
Hydrobia cattaroensis Wohlberedt, 1901	Known only from its type locality : Morača River near the village of Bioče (Podgorica Municipality)
Hydrobia declinata Wohlberedt, 1901	Known only from its type locality : Morača River near the village of Vidijenje (Podgorica Municipality)
Islamia montenegrina Glöer, Grego, Erőss & Fehér, 2015	Known only from its type locality : Vitoja Spring in the Drume Area (Tuzi Municipality)
Iverakia hausdorfi Glöer & Pešić, 2014	Known only from its type locality : Iverak Spring in the village of Pričelje (Podgorica Municipality)
Kerkia tabanensis (Boeters, Glöer & Pešić, 2014)	Known only from its type locality : Taban Spring near the village of Donji Crnci (Podgorica Municipality)
Montenegrospeum bogici Pešić & Glöer, 2013	Known only from its type locality : Taban Spring near the village of Donji Crnci (Podgorica Municipality)
Plagigeyeria feheri Grego & Glöer, 2019	Known only from its type locality: Near the Savina Monatsery in the town of Herceg Novi (Herceg Novi Municipality)
Plagigeyeria lukai Glöer & Pešić, 2014	Known only from its type locality : Unnamed spring in the village of Pričelje (Podgorica Municipality)
Plagigeyeria montenigrina Bole, 1961	Known only from its type locality : Obod Cave near the river Rijeka Crnojevića (Cetinje Municipality)
Radomaniola elongata (Radoman, 1973)	Known only from its type locality : An unnamed spring near the monastery in the village of Vranjina (Zeta Municipality)
Radomaniola lacustris (Radoman, 1983)	Known only from its type locality : Shore of the Lake Skadar near the village of Donji Murići (Bar Municipality)
Radomaniola montana (Radoman, 1973)	Known localities include : Lukavac stream near the village of Lastva Grbaljska (Kotor Municipality) and Škurca Spring near the villlage of Dobra Voda (Bar Municipality)
Stygobium hercegnoviensis Grego, Glöer, Falniowski, Hofman & Osikowski, 2019	Known localities include : Savina Monastery and Nemila Rivulet in the town of Herceg Novi, springs above the village of Sušćepan, near the St. Thomas Church in the village of Trebesinj and the village of Zelenika (Herceg Novi Municipality)
Travunijana djokovici Grego & Pešić, 2021	Known only from its type locality : Matica River tributary near the village of Bandići (Danilovgrad Municipality)
Vinodolia matjasici (Bole, 1961)	Known localities include : Unnamed spring in the village of Lipovik (Cetinje Municipality) and Vitoja Spring in the Drume area (Tuzi Municipality)
Zeteana ljiljanae Glöer & Pešić, 2014	Known only from its type locality : An unnamed spring in the village of Pričelje (Podgorica Municipality)
Family Moitessieriidae
Bosnidilhia vitojaensis Grego, Glöer, Falniowski, Hofman & Osikowski, 2019	Known only from its type locality : Vitoja Spring in the Drume area (Tuzi Municipality)
Bythiospeum bogici Pešić & Glöer, 2012	Known only from its type locality: Taban Spring near the village of Donji Crnci (Podgorica Municipality)
Bythiospeum demattiai Glöer & Pešić, 2014	Known only from its type locality : Iverak Spring in the village of Pričelje (Podgorica Municipality)
Bythiospeum vitojaense Glöer, Grego, Erőss & Fehér, 2015	Known only from its type locality : Vitoja Spring in the Drume area (Tuzi Municipality)
‘’Paladilhiopsis cattaroensis’’ Grego, Glöer, Falniowski, Hofman & Osikowski, 2019	Known only from its type locality : Unnamed spring near the village of Zelenika (Herceg Novi Municipality)
Paladilhiopsis matejkoi Grego, Glöer, Falniowski, Hofman & Osikowski, 2019	Known only from its type locality : Nemila Rivulet in the town of Herceg Novi (Herceg Novi Municipality)
Paladilhiopsis tarae Bole & Velkovrh, 1987	Known only from its type locality : Bank of the Tara river near the village of Premćani
Saxurinator hadzii (Bole, 1961)	Known only from its type locality : Obod Cave near the river Rijeka Crnojevča (Cetinje Municipality)
Order Stylommatophora (common snails and slugs)
Family Agardhiellidae
Agardhiella dabovici (Gittenberger, 1975)	Known localities include : Rid Cave near the village Popratnica (Podgorica Municipality), Jabukov Do Depression near the Ostrog Monastery (Danilovgrad Municipality), Grbočica Cave near the village of Trnovo, Vilina Cave near the village of Donja Seoca and Jabukov Do Cave near the village of Komarno (Bar Municipality)
Family Agriolimacidae
Deroceras maasseni Wiktor, 1996	Known localities include : Several localities in the Tara River Canyon and near the villages of Štitarica (Mojkovac Municipality) and Aluga (Žabljak Municipality)
Family Clausiliidae (door snails)
Agathylla goldi (Küster, 1860)	Known from two localities on the Kotor Serpentine Road near the village of Škaljari (Cetinje Municipality)
Medora lesinensis (Küster, 1847)	Known from the Orjen Mountains (Herceg Novi and Kotor Municipalities)
Montenegrina cattaroensis (Rossmässler, 1835)	Known from the coastal area including municipalities like Herceg Novi, Tivat, Kotor, Budva and Bar
Protoherilla mirabilis (H. Nordsieck, 1972)	Known only from its type locality : Near the village of Sjerogošte (Kolašin Municipality)
Family Hygromiidae (leaf snails)
Hiltrudia globulosa Subai, 2009	Known only from its type locality : Near the village of Mokrine (Herceg Novi Municipality)
Xerocampylaea taraensis Hausdorf, 2006	Known localities include : Tara River (Žabljak and Mojkovac Municipalities) and Morača River (Kolašin and Mojkovac Municipalities) canyons
Family Limacidae (keelback slugs)
Limax pseudocinereoniger Schilthuizen, Thompson, de Vries, van Peursen, Paterno, Maestri, Marcolongo, Esposti, Delledonne & Njunjić, 2022	Known localities include : Tara River Canyon and Sušica Canyon (Žabljak Municipality), Katun Zastan settlement (Gusinje Municipality) and Biogradska Gora National Park area (Kolašin Municipality), though it may also be present in Bulgaria (Vitosha Mountains)
Family Spelaeodiscidae
Klemmia magnicosta (Gittenberger, 1975)	Known localities include : Unnamed spring near Jabukov Do Depression (Danilovgrad Municipality) and Velika Jama Cave near the village of Dupilo (Bar Municipality)
Klemmia sinistrorsa (Gittenberger, 1975)	Known only from its type locality: Vilina Cave near the village of Donja Seoca (Budva Municipality)
Spelaeodiscus dejongi (Gittenberger, 1975)	Known localities include : An unnamed cave near the town of Budva (Budva Municipality), Vilina Cave near the village of Donja Seoca (Bar Municipality), Velika Jana Cave near the village of Dupilo (Bar Municipality) and Radetina Cave (location unknown)
Spelaeodiscus obodensis (Gittenberger, 1975)	Known localities include : Cetinjska and Lipa caves near the town of Cetinje, as well as an unnamed cave near the village of Bjeloši (Cetinje Municipality)
Virpazaria adrianae A. Reischütz & P. L. Reischütz, 2009	Known localities include : An unnamed cave on Vranjina Island (Tuzi Municipality), an unnamed spring in the Jabukov Do Depression (Danilovgrad Municipality), Velika Jama Cave near the village of Dupilo, Grbočica Cave near the village of Trnovo, Pecko Brdo cave near the village of Pecko Brdo, Jabukov Do Cave near the village of Komarno and many localities on the road to Virpazar (Bar Municipality)
Virpazaria aspectulabeatidis A. Reischütz & P. L. Reischütz, 2009	Known localities include : Rocks above the village of Besa and in the cracks of limestone rocks near the village of Ðuravci (Bar Municipality)
Virpazaria backhuysi (Gittenberger, 1969)	Holotype was collected in 1969 from the Virpazar area (Bar Municipality), however further attempts to locate the species were unsuccessful
Virpazaria nicoleae Fehér, Deli, Erőss & Lika, 2019	Known only from its type locality: Vitoja Spring in the Drume area (Tuzi Municipality)
Virpazaria pesici Fehér, Deli, Erőss & Lika, 2019	Known only from its type locality: Near the village of Kravari (Ulcinj Municipality)
Virpazaria stojaspali A. Reischütz & P. L. Reischütz, 2009	Known localities include : Rocks above the village of Besa and in the cracks of limestone rocks near the village of Ðuravci (Bar Municipality)
Family Zonitidae (true glass snails)
Paraegopis oberwimmeri W. Klemm, 1965	Known from several caves near the town of Cetinje (Cetinje Municipality)
Incertae sedis
Family Lymnaeidae (pond snails)
Stagnicola montenegrinus Glöer & Pešić, 2009	Known from Lake Skadar (Bar, Cetinje and Zeta Municipalities) and Rijeka Crnojevića River (Cetinje Municipality)
Family Planorbidae (ramshorn snails)
Gyraulus ioanis Glöer & Pešić, 2007	Known only from its type locality : Lake Šas near the village of Šas (Ulcinj Municipality)
Gyraulus meierbrooki Glöer & Pešić, 2007	Known from Skadar (Bar, Cetinje and Zeta Municipalities) and Gornje Malo Blato (Podgorica Municipality) lakes and villages of Karuč (Cetinje Municipality) and Virpazar (Bar Municipality)
Gyraulus shasi Glöer & Pešić, 2007	Known only from its type locality : Lake Šas near the village of Šas (Ulcinj Municipality)
Planorbis vitojensis Glöer & Pešić, 2010	Known only from its type locality : Vitoja Spring in the Drume area (Tuzi Municipality)
Family Valvatidae (valve snails)
Valvata montenegrina Glöer & Pešić, 2007	Known localities include : Mareza River (Podgorica Municipality), the villages of Karuč and Bobija (Cetinje Municipality), as well as the village of Podhum (Tuzi Municipality)

== Flora ==
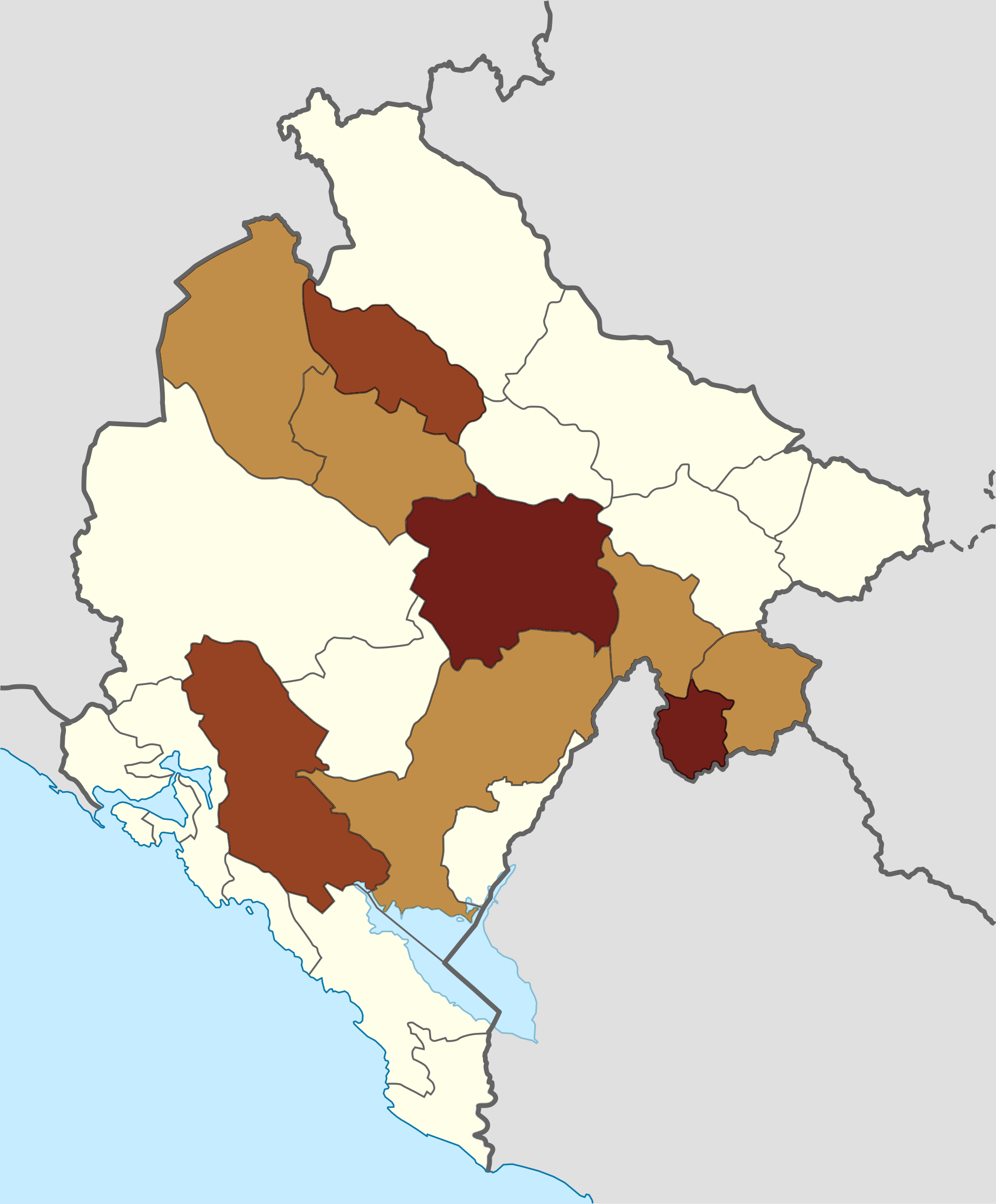
1 species found 2 species found 3 species found 4 species found

Name	Distribution
Clade Tracheophyta (vascular plants)
Clade Eudicots (eudicots)
Family Asteraceae (daisy family)
Centaurea gjurasinii Bošnjak	Known only from its type locality : Mount Volušnica in the Prokletje Mountains (Gusinje Municipality)
Hieracium gusinjense Scheff. ex Zahn	Known from two localities in the Prokletje Mountains : Near the town of Gusinje (?) (Gusinje Municipality) and on the Greben Mountain (Andrijevica Municipality)
Hieracium krendlii Gottschl.	Known only from its type locality : Near the Čakor Mountain Pass (Plav Municipality)
Taraxacum validum Štěpánek & Kirschner	Known only from its type locality : By the road in the village of Ivanova Korita (Cetinje Municipality)
Family Campanulaceae (bellflower family)
Edraianthus glisicii Černjavski & Soska	Two localities known in the Tara River Canyon : Limestone rock crevices near the Sokolina (Plužine Municipality) and Ćurevac peaks (Žabljak Municipality)
Edraianthus pilosulus (Beck) Surina & Lakušić	Known from several limestone rock crevices near the Vasojevićki Kom (Andrijevica Municipality) and Kučki Kom (Kolašin Municipality) peaks in the Komovi Mountains
Edraianthus pulevicii Surina & Lakušić	Known only from its type locality : Limestone rock crevices on the northeastern slopes of Mount Prutaš in the Durmitor Mountains (Plužine Municipality)
Edraianthus tarae Lakušić	Lakušic (1987) listed its type locality as limestone rock crevices in the Tara River Canyon (?)
Family Brassicaceae (mustard family)
Cardamine montenegrina Jar. Kucera, Lihová & Marhold	Known from more than a dozen localities in the Kotor, Podgorica, Bar, and Ulcinj municipalities
Draba bertiscea Lakušić & Stevanović	Known only from its type locality : Near the Maja Kolata Peak in the Prokletje Mountains (Gusinje Municipality)
Family Caryophyllaceae (pink/carnation family)
Arenaria halacsyi Bald.	Known only from its type locality : Kučki Kom Peak in the Komovi Mountains (Kolašin Municipality)
Family Gentianaceae (gentian family)
Gentianella laevicalyx Rohlena	Two localities known : Bobotov Kuk and Savin Kuk peaks in the Durmitor Mountains (Zabljak Municipality)
Gentianella pevalekii Bjelčić & E. Mayer	Known only from its type locality : Above the village of Štavna in the Komovi Mountains (Andrijevica Municipality)
Family Lamiaceae (mint family)
Petrolamium crnojevicii Dragićević, Vuksanović & Surina	Known only from its type locality : Cracks in the limestone rocks near the village of Štitari (Cetinje Municipality)
Family Rosaceae (rose family)
Alchemilla bertiscea Martinčič	Known only from its type locality : Karanfili Peaks in the Prokletje Mountains (Gusinje Municipality)
Alchemilla montenegrina Plocek	Known only from its type locality : Near the Štitan Peak in the Kuči Mountains (Podgorica Municipality)
Alchemilla rubidula Plocek	Plocek (1998) listed its type locality as Morača Mountains (Kolašin Municipality)
Alchemilla vincekii Plocek	Plocek (1998) listed its type locality as Prokletje Mountains (Gusinje Municipality) (?)
Clade Monocots (monocots)
Family Poaceae (true grasses)
Festuca rohlenae Lakušić	Two localities known : Štirni Do Valley (Šavnik Municipality) and Korita Rovačka (?) in the Morača Mountains (Kolašin Municipality)

== Fungi ==
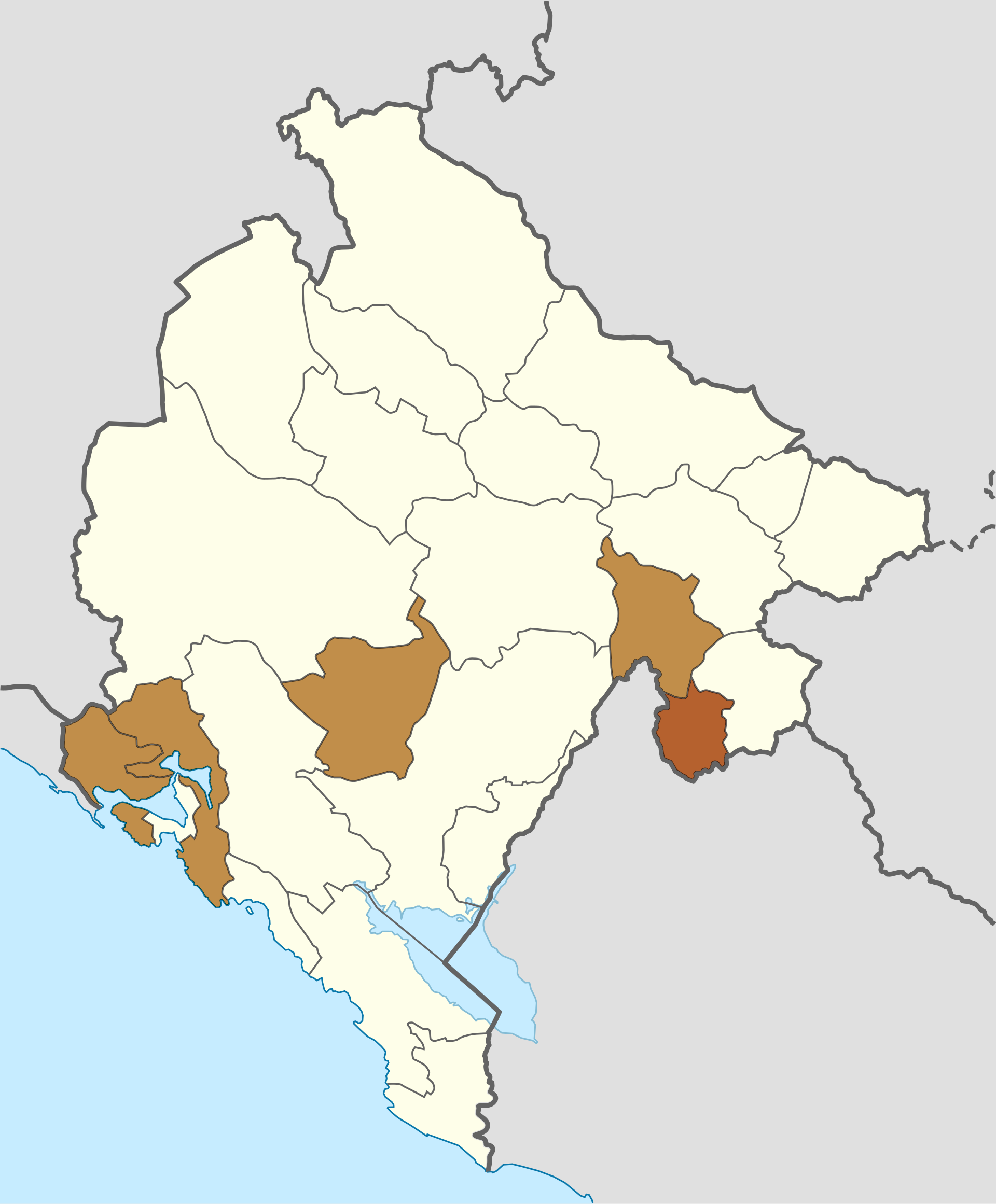
1 species found 2 species found

Name	Distribution
Class Eurotiomycetes
Order Verrucariales
Family Verrucariaceae
Verrucaria hercegensis Servít, 1948	Servít (1948) listed its type locality as Herceg Novi
Class Lecanoromycetes (common lichens)
Order Lecanorales (shield lichens, rim lichens, and allies)
Family Lecanoraceae (rim lichens, disc lichens, and allies)
Lecanora sphalera Poelt & Leuckert, 1976	Known only from its type locality : Limestone rocks on the lower slopes of Vasojevićki Kom Peak in the Komovi Mountains (Andrijevica Municipality)
Order Lecideales
Family Lecideaceae
Porpidia circumnigrata (Vězda) Knežević & Mayrhofer, 2009	Known only from its type locality : Limestone rocks above the village of Donji Morinj (Kotor Municipality)
Class Leotiomycetes
Order Helotiales
Family Cenangiaceae
Cenangiopsis junipericola Perić & Baral, 2015	Known from two localities : Bark of the common juniper (Juniperus communis) near the Planinica Peak in the Komovi Mountains (Podgorica Municipality) and in the Ropojana Valley (Gusinje Municipality)
Cenangiopsis raghavanii Perić & Baral, 2015	Known only from its type locality : Bark of the common juniper (Juniperus communis) in the Ropojana Valley in the Prokletije Mountains (Gusinje Municipality)
Family Rutstroemiaceae
Rutstroemia punicae Perić & Baral, 2019	Three localities known : Bark of the pomegranate (Punica granatum) near the villages of Glizica, Donje Selo and Gornji Martinići (Danilovgrad Municipality)
