= Lubnice =

Lubnice or Łubnice may refer to:

- Lubnice (Znojmo District), Czech Republic
- Lubnice, Berane Municipality, Montenegro
- Łubnice, Łódź Voivodeship, Poland
- Łubnice, Świętokrzyskie Voivodeship, Poland
