= Petrolamium =

Scientific classification
- Kingdom: Plantae
- Clade: Tracheophytes
- Clade: Angiosperms
- Clade: Eudicots
- Clade: Asterids
- Order: Lamiales
- Family: Lamiaceae
- Genus: Petrolamium; Dragićević, Vuksanović & Surina
- Species: P. crnojevicii

Binomial name
- Petrolamium crnojevicii Dragićević, Vuksanović & Surina

Monotypic genus of flowering plant

Petrolamium is a monotypic genus of flowering plants in the mint family. It is represented by a single known species, Petrolamium crnojevicii, also referred to as the Miracle of Štitar, which is known only from a single locality in Montenegro.

== Etymology ==
The genus name Petrolamium derives from the Latin "petra" (rock) and Lamium (a related genus). The specific epithet crnojevicii honors Ivan Crnojević, a 15th-century ruler of Zeta.

== Description ==
This species is a perennial herb. Its reniform (kidney-shaped) leaves, which are primarily glabrous (hairless) and devoid of glands (eglandular), are its most prominent vegetative characteristic. The leaves exhibit prominent hydathodes (structures that leak water) near their tips and have five to seven lobes.

The plant produces small, pedicellate flowers. Its corolla, formed from fused petals, exhibits a distinct two-lipped structure. The posterior lip is straight and narrow, with an emarginate to bifurcate tip. The anterior lip features lateral lobes that are unlobed, or entire, and broadly elliptic-oblong in shape. Both the stamens and the style are included within the corolla tube, meaning they do not protrude. The anthers similarly remain contained and do not extend beyond the corolla opening.

The fruit is made up of truncated-apexed trigonous mericarps, or nutlets, which are characteristic of the Lamiaceae family.

== Habitat and distribution ==
The species is only known from its type locality close to the village of Štitari located in the Cetinje Municipality, Montenegro. It lives in floristically depauperate cracks in limestone rocks.

== Phylogeny ==
Petrolamium belongs to the subfamily Lamioideae according to molecular phylogenetic analysis based on plastid genes. It is sister to the other members of the tribe Lamieae and constitutes a unique, evolutionarily separated lineage. Genera in Central and East Asia, including some in the Himalayas, are its closest cousins.

== Significance ==
The identification of a new genus of flowering plant in Europe's well-studied flora is practically unparalleled in the 21st century, which is why the finding is regarded as remarkable. It emphasises the possibility of making important botanical discoveries even in areas that have been extensively investigated and in plant families like the Lamiaceae. The plant has also been proposed as a possible national botanical symbol for Montenegro.
