= Lecanora sphalera =

Scientific classification
- Kingdom: Fungi
- Division: Ascomycota
- Class: Lecanoromycetes
- Order: Lecanorales
- Family: Lecanoraceae
- Genus: Lecanora
- Species: L. sphalera

Binomial name
- Lecanora sphalera Poelt & Leuckert, 1976

Species of lichen

Lecanora sphalera is a species of crustose lichen in the family Lecanoraceae found in Montenegro.

This species is endemic to Montenegro and has been recorded only once from its type locality. The collection site is on northwest-exposed limestone rocks at approximately 1,920 meters elevation on the lower slopes of Vasojevički Kom, part of the Komovi massif in Andrijevica Municipality.
