= Crematogaster montenigrinus =

Scientific classification
- Kingdom: Animalia
- Phylum: Arthropoda
- Class: Insecta
- Order: Hymenoptera
- Family: Formicidae
- Subfamily: Myrmicinae
- Genus: Crematogaster
- Species: C. montenigrinus

Binomial name
- Crematogaster montenigrinus Karaman, M., 2008

Species of ant

Crematogaster montenigrinus species of ant in the subfamily Myrmicinae.It is found in Montenegro.

== Appearance ==
Crematogaster montenigrinus is a member of the C. scutellaris group. It is distinguished by its small size, dark brown to black coloration, and notably long propodeal spines. While its color is similar to C. algirica and C. laestrygon, it has longer spines than the former and a smaller body than the latter. Furthermore, its thoracic sculpture is weaker and its longitudinal keel is less prominent than in related species like C. schmidti and C. gordani.

== Distribution ==
Crematogaster montenegrinus is endemic to Montenegro.It has a very limited known distribution, with records from just three sites in Montenegro: the Herceg Novi (near the Monastery of Sveta Savina), Donja Lastva, and the western mouth of the Bojana River.

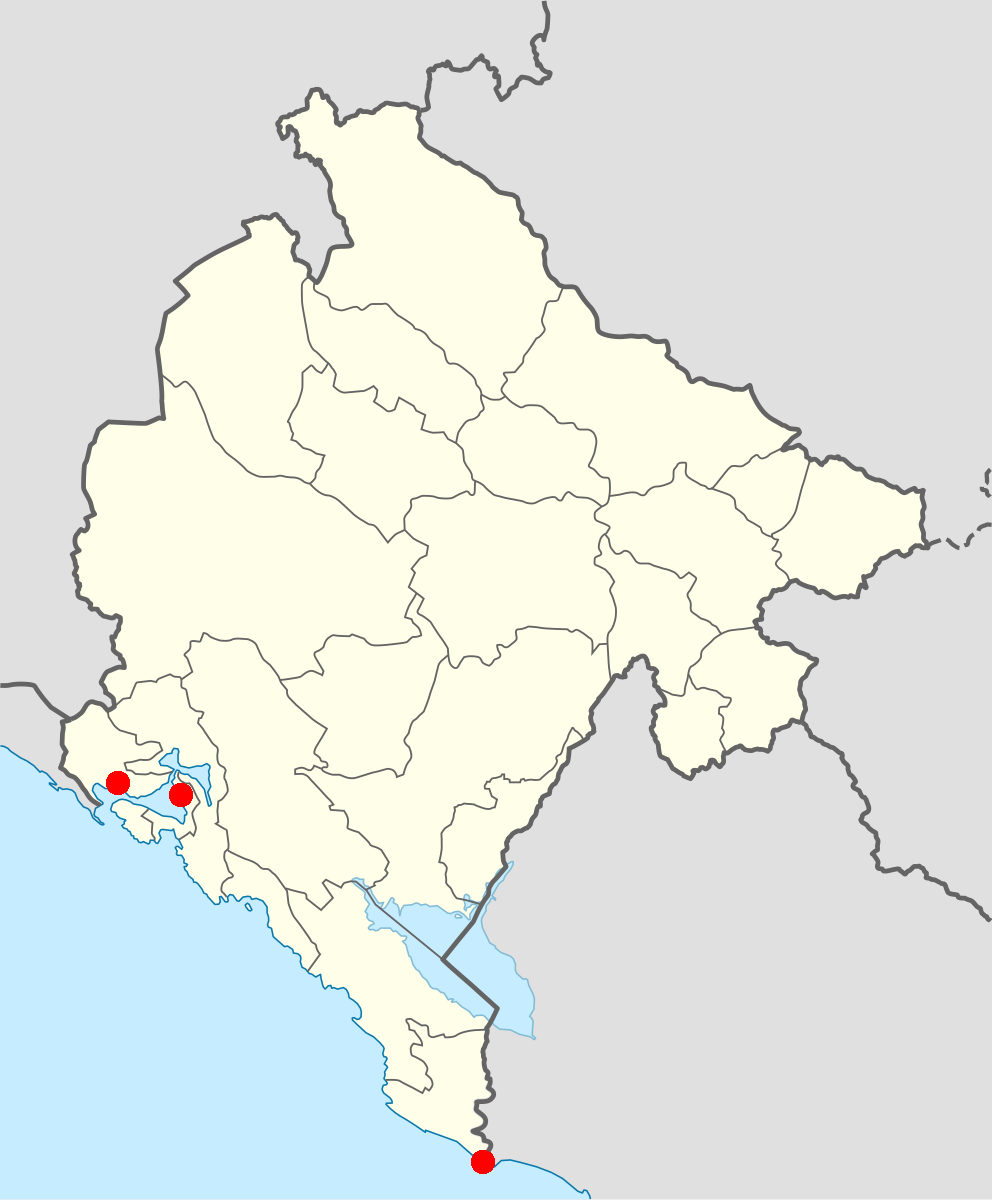
Crematogaster montenegrinus Records Map
