= Kuči Mountains =

Mountain massif in Montenegro

- Kučke planine / Žijevo
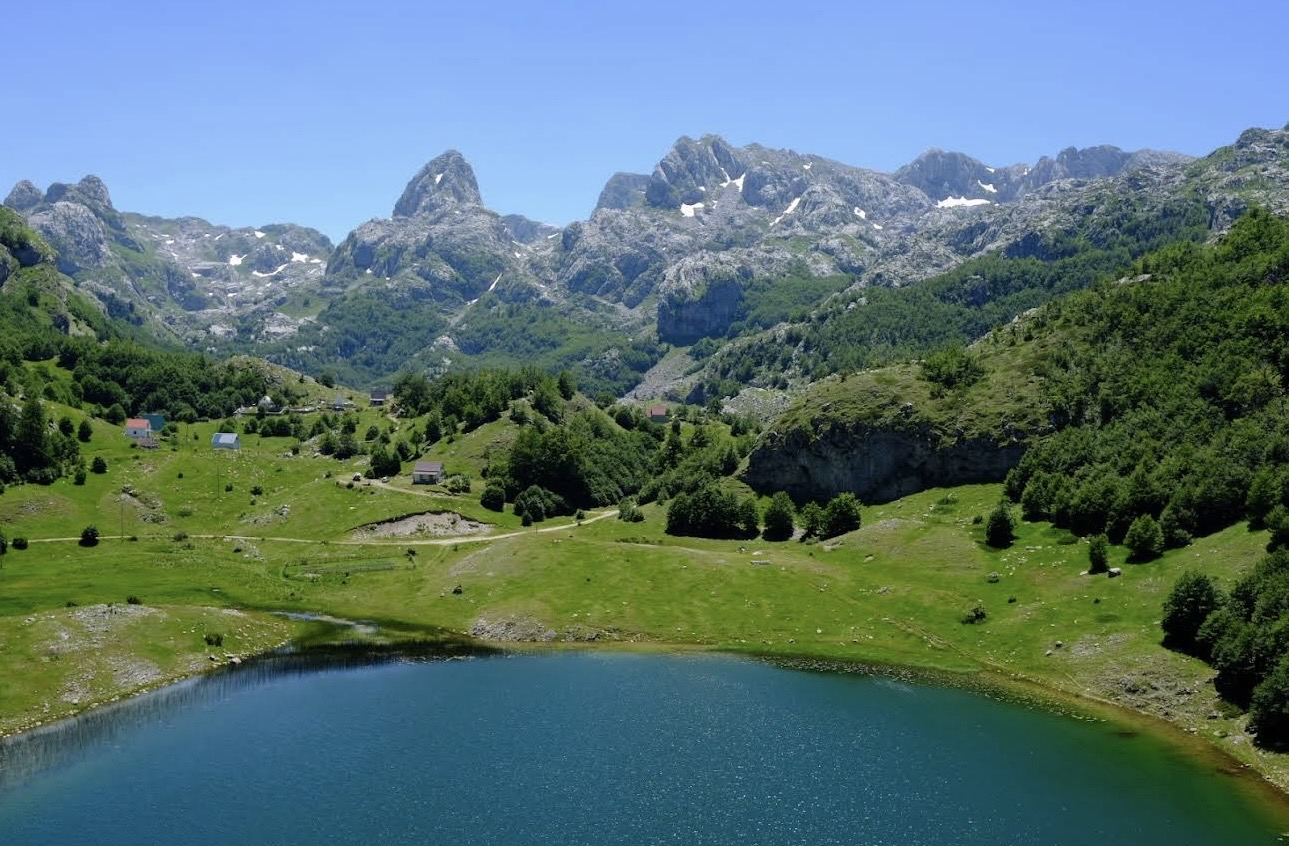
- Lake Bukumir

Highest point
- Peak: Surdup
- Elevation: 2,184 m (7,165 ft)
- Coordinates: 42°33′51.2″N 19°32′45.7″E

Geography
- Location within Montenegro
- Country: Montenegro
- Region: Podgorica Capital City

Geology
- Orogeny: Dinaric Alps

The Kuči Mountains (Serbo-Croatian: Kučke planine, Кучке планине), also known as Žijevo or Žijovo, are a mountain massif in eastern Montenegro, situated northeast of the capital Podgorica and adjacent to the Albanian border. The surrounding region is traditionally called the region of Kuči (Serbo-Croatian: Kučka Krajina), named after the Montenegrin tribe of Kuči.

== Geography and geology ==
The mountains form a vast karstic plateau (Serbo-Croatian: površ) from which numerous summits and smaller mountain groups rise. The relief is highly indented and shows significant traces of glaciation, similar to the neighboring Prokletije range. Unlike the typical northwest-southeast orientation of the Dinaric Alps, the Kuči Mountains stretch in various directions with no single dominant orientation.

The range is bordered by the Morača river and Mala Rijeka (meaning "Small River") river to the west, the road from Podgorica to Lijeva Rijeka and Veruša, the Cijevna river and the Zeta river valley to the south and southwest, and the summits along the Montenegrin-Albanian border to the east. Its northern neighbor is the Komovi massif. The Cijevna river, which springs in the Prokletije in Albania, flows through the area for 32.3 km (20.1 mi) of its total 58.8 km (36.5 mi) length.

=== Classification debate ===
There is geographical debate regarding the classification of the Kuči Mountains. Some Montenegrin sources consider them a western continuation of the Prokletije range (sometimes termed "Kučke Prokletije") due to similarities with neighboring Malesija e Madhe and the Albanian Prokletije. However, other geographical schools, mountaineering clubs, and former Yugoslav National Army (JNA) maps restrict the name "Prokletije" to the central range east of the Cijevna River to the Čakor pass, excluding northeastern extensions over Hajla and Žljeb mountains. Consequently, they are often treated as a separate mountain massif within the Montenegrin high karstic region.

== Highest Peaks ==
There are more than fifteen peaks exceeding 2,000 m (6,600 ft), including Surdup (2,184 m (7,165 ft)) Štitan (2,165 m (7,103 ft)), Maglić Kučki (2,142 m (7,028 ft)), Kanjavi Vrh (2,140 m (7,020 ft)), Žijevo (2,131 m (6,991 ft)), Šila Velja (2,129 m), Stožina (2,120 m (6,960 ft)), and Pasjak (2,025 m (6,644 ft)). Because the peaks rise from an already elevated plateau, their true height is often visually understated, though they exhibit high-mountain features like sharp tops, glacial ridges, and chasms.

== Lakes ==
The range features two notable glacial lakes:

- Lake Bukumiri (Serbo-Croatian: Bukumirsko jezero) is situated at an altitude of 1,448 m between the peaks of Torač, Velji Vrh, and Gozd. It has a surface area of 19,320 m^{2} (208,000 sq ft) and a maximum depth of 16.8 m (55 ft). The lake is fed by rain, snowmelt, and periodic springs from Katun Ivanović, and about 15% of its surface is covered by vegetation. It is a central starting point for climbing routes and a recognizable symbol of the range.
- Lake Rikavac (Serbo-Croatian: Rikavačko jezero) lies at 1,313 m (4,308 ft), below the peak of Vila (2,093 m (6,867 ft)), at the point where the Kuči Mountains separate from the Prokletije. It has a surface area of 117,755 m^{2} (1,267,500 sq ft), is 525 m (1,722 ft) long and 235 m (771 ft) wide, with a coastline of 1,640 m (5,380 ft) and a maximum depth of 13.9 m (46 ft). Its waters drain into the Cijevna and Ribnica rivers. The lake is accessible only by terrain vehicle or on foot via a narrow gravel road.

== Human activity ==
=== Katuns (seasonal settlements) ===
The mountains are historically characterized by katuns, traditional seasonal settlements for summer cattle grazing. A 2020 study documented 193 katuns within the Kuči Mountain area, containing over 2,900 housing and subsidiary structures. These settlements, built primarily using drystone wall techniques, represent an important part of the region's vernacular architectural heritage and are linked to the practice of transhumance. Their use declined significantly in the latter half of the 20th century due to urbanization and industrialization, leading to abandonment, though there is some recent, limited return to seasonal use.

=== Viticulture ===
The Kuči wine subregion is a small but historically significant wine-growing zone within the Lake Skadar Basin region, covering 4,784.87 ha (11,823.7 acres). Vineyards are small, family-owned, and scattered across steep hillsides, with traditional cultivation methods dominating. The flagship variety is the native Vranac, which constitutes 36.52% of vineyard area, with additional plantings in mixed vineyards. Other varieties include Chardonnay, the local Čubrica, and Kratošija. The climate is continental-Mediterranean with significant diurnal temperature variation, and the soils are karst-based, shallow, and well-drained.

== Biodiversity ==
The Kuči Mountains are noted for their high degree of floral diversity. A prominent example is Alchemilla montenegrina, a species of lady's mantle which is found exclusively within the massif and is endemic to Montenegro.
