= Štitari =

Štitari may refer to:

- Štitari, Cetinje, a village in Cetinje Municipality, Montenegro
- Štitari, Berane, a village in Montenegro
- Štitari, Nikšić, a village in Nikšić Municipality, Montenegro

== See also ==
- Štitar (disambiguation)
