= Štitar =

Štitar may refer to:

- Štitar, Serbia, a village near Šabac in Serbia
- Štitar, Croatia, a village and municipality in eastern Croatia

== See also ==
- Štitari (disambiguation)
