= Arenaria halacsyi =

Scientific classification
- Kingdom: Plantae
- Clade: Tracheophytes
- Clade: Angiosperms
- Clade: Eudicots
- Order: Caryophyllales
- Family: Caryophyllaceae
- Genus: Arenaria
- Species: A. halacsyi

Binomial name
- Arenaria halacsyi Bald.

Species of plant

Arenaria halacsyi is a species of flowering plant in the family Caryophyllaceae found in Montenegro.

== Description ==
Arenaria halacsyi is a low-growing perennial forming small tufts. Its stems are slender, 2–5 cm long, and covered with short white deflexed hairs, especially in the upper part. The leaves are small (2–4 mm), ovate, lanceolate or obovate, shortly petiolate, with a single vein, and are mostly hairless except for a strongly ciliate base. They are densely crowded on non-flowering stems.

The flowers are solitary or paired, with pedicels 1–2 times as long as the sepals. The sepals are 3–4 mm long, oblong-lanceolate, obtuse to subacute, and glandular-hairy. The petals are white, broadly spathulate, and only slightly longer than the sepals. The capsule is ovoid and slightly exceeds the sepals.

== Distribution ==
The species is endemic to Montenegro, known only from its type locality: Kom Kučki in the Komovi massif, southwest of Andrijevica.

== Habitat ==
It grows in rock crevices in a high-mountain habitat.
