= Lipa Cave =

Karst cave in Montenegro

Coordinates: 42.3740°N 18.9534°E

Lipa Cave (Serbian: Липска пећина, romanized: Lipska pećina) is a karst cave situated close to Cetinje, Montenegro. It has a system of about 2.5 kilometres (1.6 mi) of passages and halls, which makes it one of the largest caves in Montenegro. It's the first cave in Montenegro which opened for tourists, after the cave's valorisation projected finished thanks to the help of the Municipality of Cetinje and the Lipa Cave company.

== Cave ==
Lipa Cave is one of the largest caves in Montenegro. It is a karst cave with a system of about 2.5 kilometres (1.6 mi) of passages and halls. The difference in elevation between the highest and the lowest point in the cave system is more than 300 m (980 ft). In 2015, a total of 3,512 m (11,522 ft) of the cave had been explored and surveyed. Part of the cave contains an underground river. It starts close to the village of Lipa and stretches into the mountains by the Adriatic Sea. The temperature in the cave is 8–12 °C (46–54 °F).

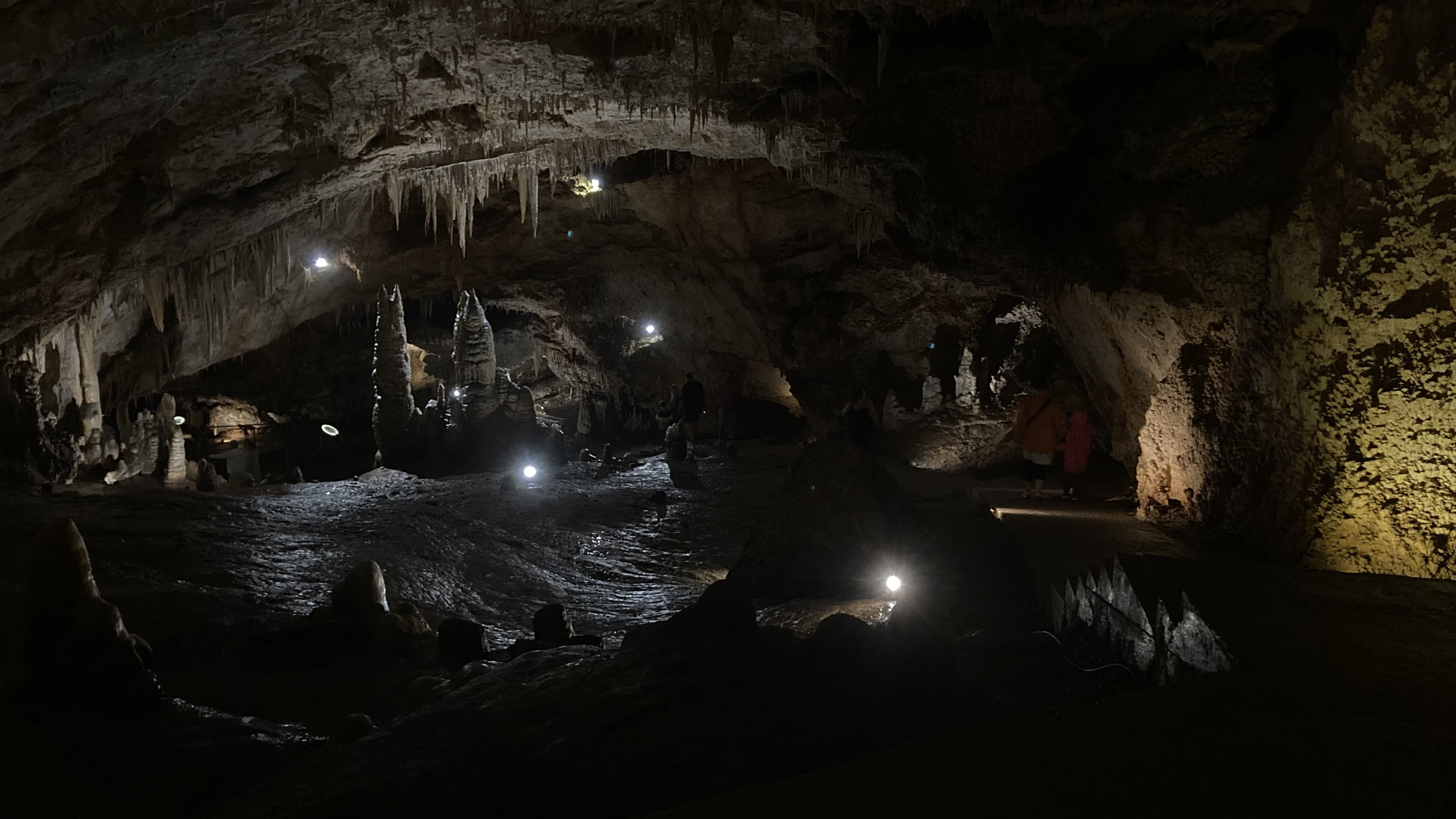
The inside of Lipa Cave near Cetinje, Montenegro

Lipa Cave is first and only cave in Montenegro accessible for group visits. It is maintained through a partnership between private enterprise and the municipality. In the territory of Cetinje, there are more than 1,000 speleological objects, of which the most significant are Lipa Cave, Obod Cave and Cetinje Cave. Of these, Lipa Cave has the longest passages and greatest number of preserved cave formations. Most of the caves in the area are covered with snow and ice for the most part of the year, making Lipa Cave the most noted.

As of 2015 the cave can only be visited if visitors are accompanied by trained guides on special tours. Besides their role in preserving cave formations, the guides tell visitors about the cave and its history. Before being opened permanently on 13 July 2015, Lipa Cave had been open to visitors only twice. The cave is one of the main attractions in Montenegro.

=== Cave formations ===
The cave is rich in cave formations—stalactites, stalagmites and stalagnates (pillars)—with many being found in a small space. Some of the most significant stalactites are spaghetti, popcorn, crocodile, and curtain formations. Some of the most significant stalagmites are totem and gral formations.

== History ==
Exploration of the cave began in the 19th century; a more extensive survey of the cave was made during the late 20th century. During the Austrian occupation in the early 20th century, the cave had a strategic importance, with Austrian soldiers widening the entrance to gain access to drinking water. The historical significance of the cave is noted by the many researchers that have visited it in the past, including

- Austen Henry Layard – English researcher who visited the cave in 1839 and gave the first written mention of it
- Wilhelm Ebel – German scientist visiting Montenegro in 1841
- Pavel Rovinsky – Russian geographer, ethnographer and scientist, in 1887
- Édouard-Alfred Martel - founder of modern speleology, in 1894

Petar II Petrović-Njegoš issued an order for exploration of the cave; but since he died young, the exploration was not carried out, although one of the cave galleries is named in his honor. King Nikola was known to take foreign officials to visit the cave in order to show them its unique features.

== Location ==
The cave is located in Lipa Dobrska, a small settlement overlooking Dobrsko Selo in the Old Royal Capital Cetinje municipality. The entrance of the cave is 5 km (3.1 mi) from Cetinje city. The exit leading to the cave is just about 3 km (1.9 mi) from Cetinje, on the Cetinje–Podgorica road, next to the Belvedere viewpoint. There is a parking lot for vehicles, from which visitors can take a train.
