= Cetinje Cave =

Cave in the town of Cetinje, Montenegro

- Cetinjska pećina/Цетињска пећина
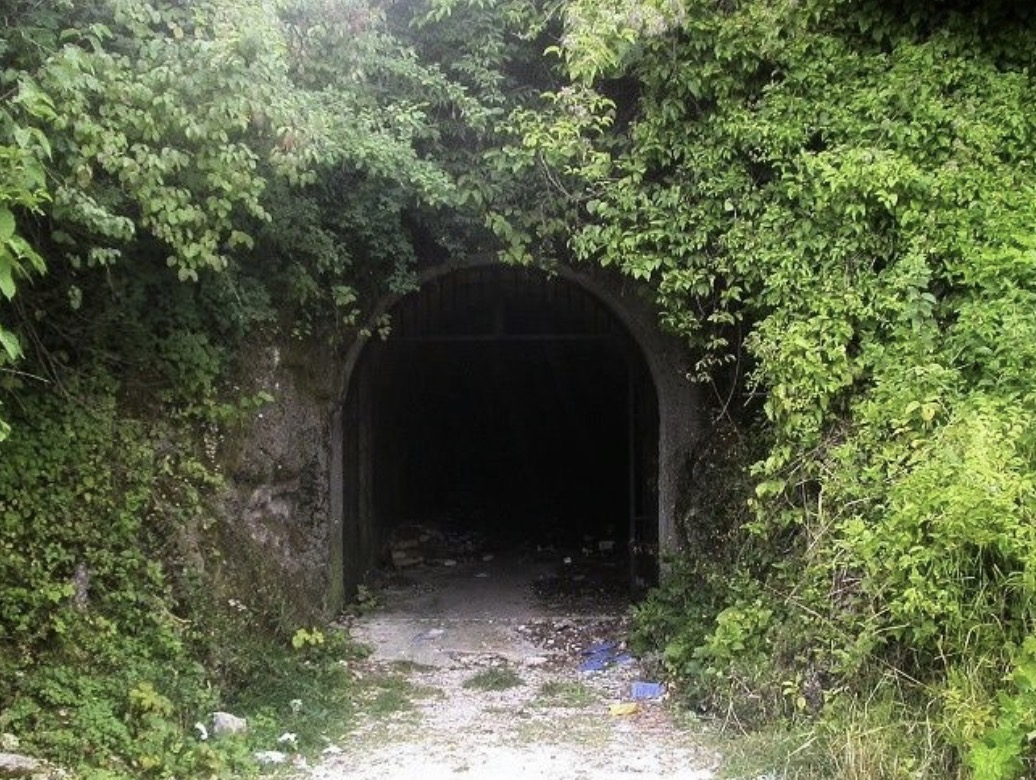
- Cetinje Cave Entrance
- Interactive map of Cetinje Cave
- Location: Cetinje, Montenegro
- Coordinates: 42.3881181°N 18.9209173°E
- Length: 2,650 m (8,690 ft) (developed trail)
- Geology: Karst cave
- Entrances: 2
- Access: Currently unrestricted (as of 2022)

Cetinje Cave (Serbo-Croatian: Цетињска Пећина, Cetinjska Pećina) is a karst cave located in the town of Cetinje, Montenegro. It is situated directly behind the Cetinje Monastery at the foot of a cliff face.

== Description ==
The cave features a developed concrete trail and staircase, though it has never been formally opened as a show cave. The main passage extends for approximately 2,650 meters. After 300 meters, the trail splits into two branches. The right-hand branch descends deeper into the cave, rumored in local legend to lead towards the Rijeka Crnojevića river, roughly 15 km away. The left-hand branch ascends to a secondary exit at the top of the hill above the monastery. Explorations of the right branch have reported strange stone formations, bats, and areas of shifting sand approximately 1,000–1,100 meters from the entrance, beyond which exploration without proper equipment becomes hazardous.

Access to the cave has been unrestricted and free of charge as of 2022, though this status is subject to change. Visitors are advised to bring their own light sources.

== History ==
A prominent legend associated with the cave states that monks from the adjacent Cetinje Monastery used it as a hideout and secret passage during the Turkish occupation. The legend claims the cave runs underground all the way to the Rijeka Crnojevića river, allowing for covert travel. This legend is fueled by the cave's behavior during floods (see below), though hydrologically it is connected to the local karst water table beneath the Cetinjsko Polje, not directly to the distant river.

In 1986, Cetinje experienced a catastrophic flood due to a combination of heavy rains and snowmelt. The cave filled with water and acted as a resurgence, with a powerful stream of muddy water erupting from its entrance. This event caused significant damage to the cave's infrastructure and required the evacuation of many town residents. The 1986 flood also formed an artificial tunnel within the cave system.

== Renovation Project ==
There are long-standing plans by the Montenegrin government to renovate and formally open the cave. A major project, announced by Cetinje Mayor Aleksandar Bogdanović, involves adapting the cave to house the Our Lady of Philermos icon (Bogorodica Filermosa), a significant Christian relic currently held in the National Museum of Montenegro.

The investment for reconstructing the upper part of the cave, including an interior chamber (atrium) for the icon and all necessary geological, hydrological, and geotechnical work, is estimated at nearly two million euros. A geological study to permanently address groundwater issues cost 150,000 euros. The design, by architect Christiano Benzoni (of Brusa Pasque & REV Architecture Paris and Marco Verdina studios), involves creating a subterranean sanctuary in the upper tunnel to avoid flood risks. The chamber will be 12 meters high, oriented to the east, and feature natural light wells.

The project aims to solve the groundwater problem via two dams in the artificial tunnel formed in 1986, directing atmospheric precipitation beneath the chamber and out into the Cetinjsko Polje field. Proponents argue it will position Cetinje as a leading spiritual and tourist center, potentially increasing annual tourist numbers by 40,000–60,000. The plan, however, has generated mixed public opinion within Montenegro regarding the suitability of the cave for preserving the icon.

== Biodiversity ==
Cetinje Cave is one of the most speciose caves in Montenegro, hosting more than a dozen troglobitic (cave-dwelling) species. Among those are isopod Cetinjella monasterii, ostracod Trajancandona natura, carabid beetle Adriaphaenops njegosiensis and two hollow-shelled snails Zospeum intermedium and Zospeum tortuosum all of which are found nowhere else on Earth.

== See also ==
- Cetinje Monastery
