= Eumerus incisus =

Scientific classification
- Kingdom: Animalia
- Phylum: Arthropoda
- Clade: Pancrustacea
- Class: Insecta
- Order: Diptera
- Family: Syrphidae
- Genus: Eumerus
- Species: E. incisus

Binomial name
- Eumerus incisus Vujić & Malidžan, 2022
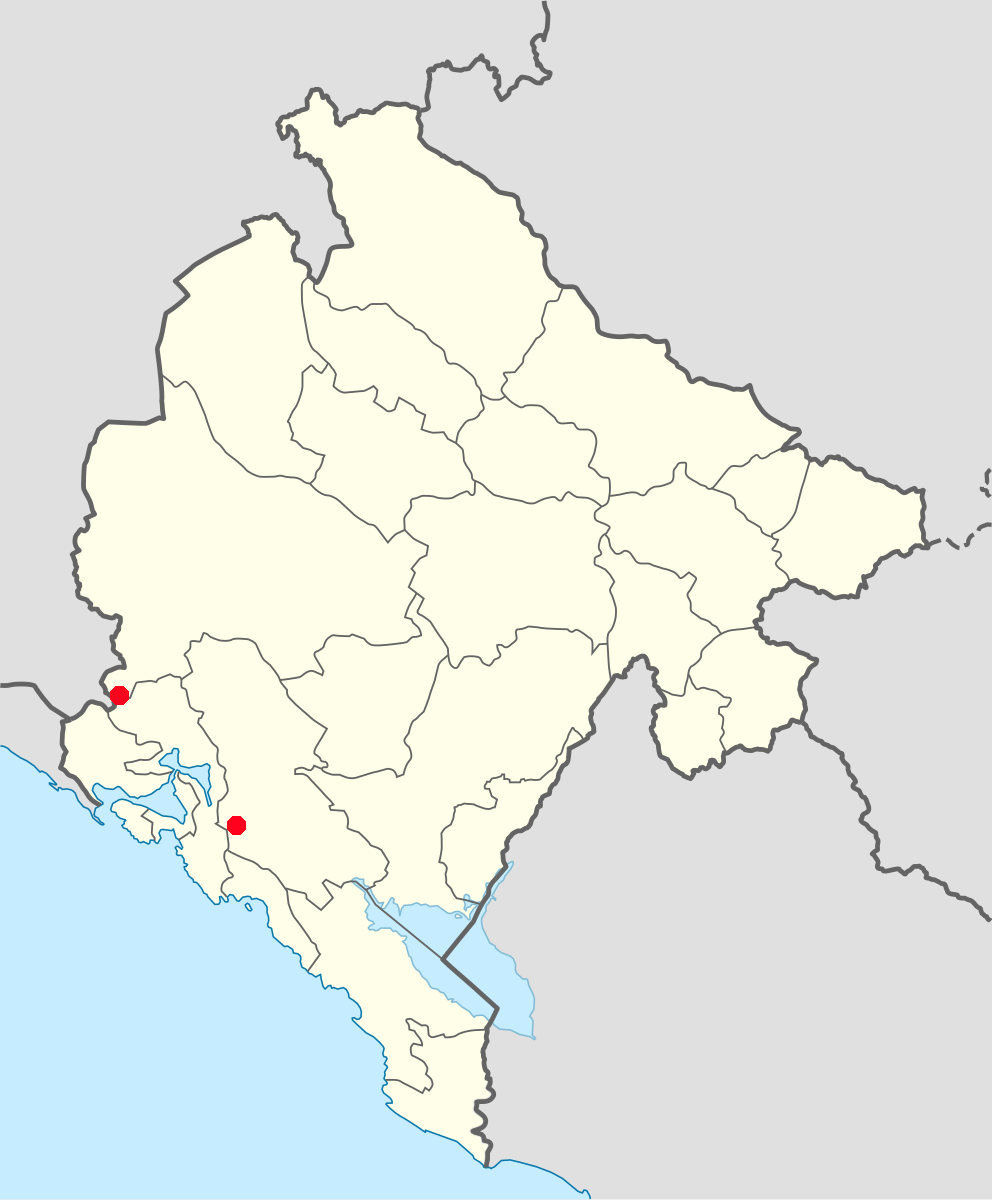

Species of hoverfly

Eumerus incisus is a species of hoverfly, from the family Syrphidae, in the order Diptera.

== Distribution ==
This species is endemic to Montenegro. Its full geographic range is poorly understood, but it is currently known only from the Orjen and Lovćen mountains.
