= Drume =

Drume Друме Drume
- Village
- Location within Montenegro
- Coordinates: 42.327344°N 19.376952°E
- Country: Montenegro
- Municipality: Tuzi

Population (2011)
  - Total: 166
- Time zone: UTC+1 (CET)
  - Summer (DST): UTC+2 (CEST)

Drume (Cyrillic: Друме; Albanian: Drume) is a tribal region in the municipality of Tuzi, Montenegro. It is located close to the Albanian border.

== Demographics ==
According to the 2011 census, its population was 166, all but one of them Albanians.
