= Trebesinj =

Village in Herceg Novi, Montenegro

Trebesinj Требесињ
- Village
- Location within Montenegro
- Coordinates: 42.472269°N 18.523865°E
- Country: Montenegro
- Region: Coastal
- Municipality: Herceg Novi

Population (2011)
  - Total: 196
- Time zone: UTC+1 (CET)
  - Summer (DST): UTC+2 (CEST)

Trebesinj (Montenegrin: Требесињ) is a village in the municipality of Herceg Novi, Montenegro.

== Demographics ==
According to the 2011 census, its population was 196.

Ethnicity in 2011
Ethnicity	Number	Percentage
Serbs	105	53.6%
Montenegrins	69	35.2%
other/undeclared	22	11.2%
Total	196	100%
