= Bajovo Polje =

Bajovo Polje Бајово Поље
- Village
- Location within Montenegro
- Country: Montenegro
- Municipality: Plužine

Population (2011)
  - Total: 46
- Time zone: UTC+1 (CET)
  - Summer (DST): UTC+2 (CEST)

Bajovo Polje (Montenegrin: Бајово Поље) is a village in the Plužine municipality in Montenegro. It is located in the historical tribe of Piva.

The village of Bajovo Polje ("Bajo's field") was named after 17th-century hajduk Bajo Pivljanin, it is said, after he killed his first Turk at the field. The village is located in the Površ region of Pivska Župa, at a small field above the start of the road to Brezna. The field is wavy with many valleys and sinkholes, on which the houses are scattered without any order. Fields and meadows are in and around the village. The winter pastures (katuni) are below the Golija, and stables in the village between the houses. The village was founded in 1862, during the temporary liberation of Piva. The village has two families:

- Jovovići (23 houses, slava of St. John), descending from the Jovović from Zabrđe. They had winter pastures in Bajovo Polje, and thus founded the village. The Jovovići has branched out much, however, the branches claim kinship only in case of "wrongdoings".
- Jovićević (1 house, slava of St. Nicholas), descending from the Pejović from Orah.

== Demographic history ==
- 2011: 46.
  - 30.4% Montenegrins
  - 54.3% Serbs
- 2003: 84.
  - 52.38% Montenegrins
  - 45.23% Serbs
- 1991: 77.
- 1981: 144.
- 1971: 147.
- 1961: 148.
- 1953: 155.
- 1948: 148.
- 1931: 121.
- 1921: 117.

== Sources ==
- Blagojević, Obren (1971). "Пива". Editions Speciales. 443. SANU.
- Tomić, Svetozar (1949) [1946]. Piva i Pivljani. SAN.
