= Donji Morinj =

Donji Morinj Доњи Морињ
- Village
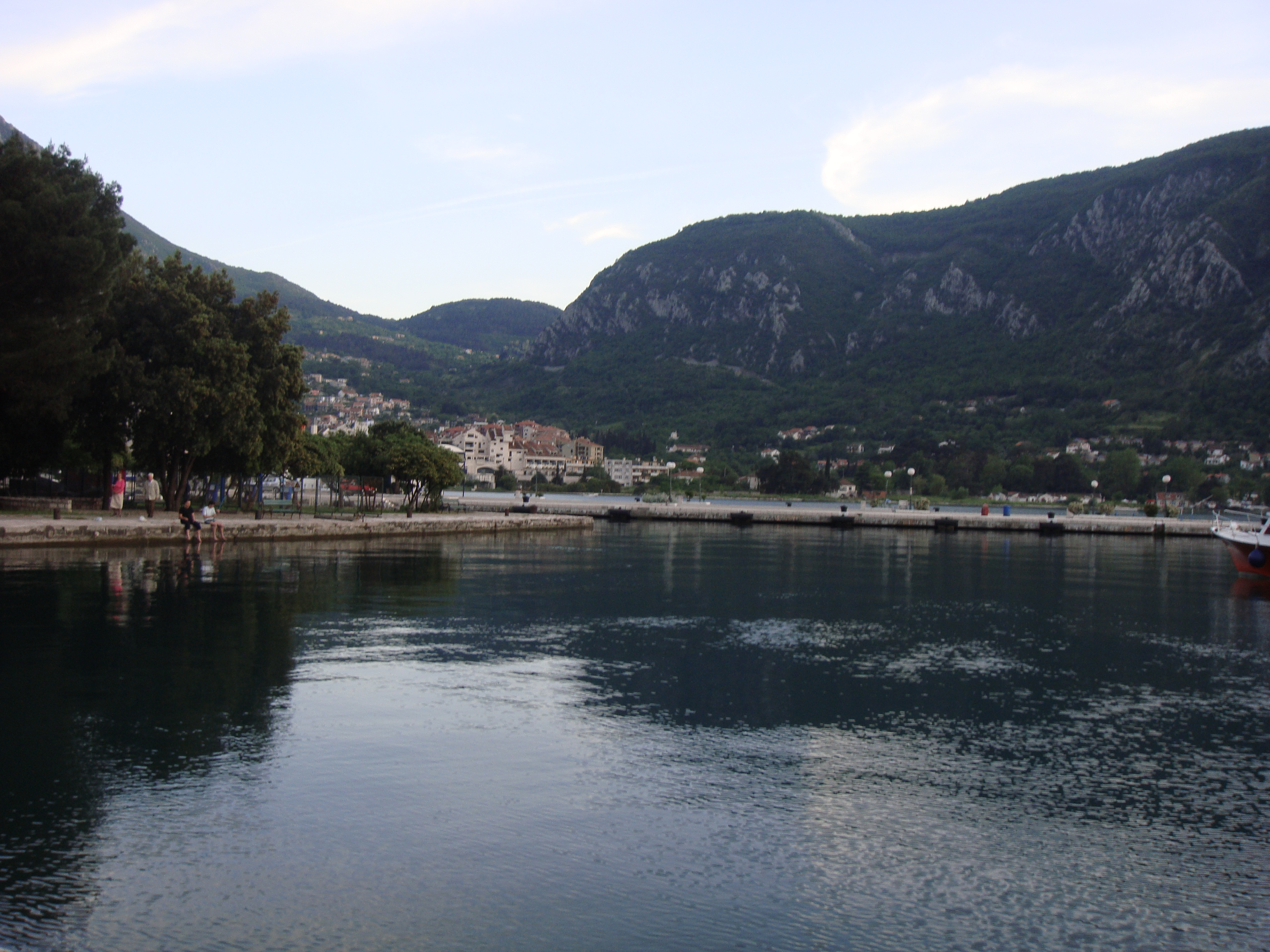

- Location within Montenegro
- Coordinates: 42.489184°N 18.649116°E
- Country: Montenegro
- Region: Coastal
- Municipality: Kotor

Population (2011)
  - Total: 224
- Time zone: UTC+1 (CET)
  - Summer (DST): UTC+2 (CEST)

Donji Morinj (Montenegrin: Доњи Морињ) is a village in the municipality of Kotor, Montenegro.

== Demographics ==
According to the 2011 census, its population was 224.

Ethnicity in 2011
| Ethnicity | Number | Percentage |
|---|---|---|
| Serbs | 106 | 47.3% |
| Montenegrins | 71 | 31.7% |
| other/undeclared | 47 | 21.0% |
| Total | 224 | 100% |
