= Virak =

Virak is both a surname and a given name. Notable people with the name include:

- Ou Virak (born 1976), Cambodian activist
- Virak Dara (born 1947), Cambodian actress

== See also ==
- Vira (given name)
