= Donja Brezna =

Donja Brezna Доња Брезна
- Village
- Location within Montenegro
- Coordinates: 42.996747°N 18.901611°E
- Country: Montenegro
- Municipality: Plužine

Population (2011)
  - Total: 140
- Time zone: UTC+1 (CET)
  - Summer (DST): UTC+2 (CEST)

Donja Brezna (Montenegrin: Доња Брезна) is a village in the municipality of Plužine, Montenegro.

== Demographics ==
According to the 2011 census, its population was 140.

Ethnicity in 2011
Ethnicity	Number	Percentage
Serbs	78	100%
other/undeclared	21	15.0%
Total	140	100%
