= Lake Biograd =

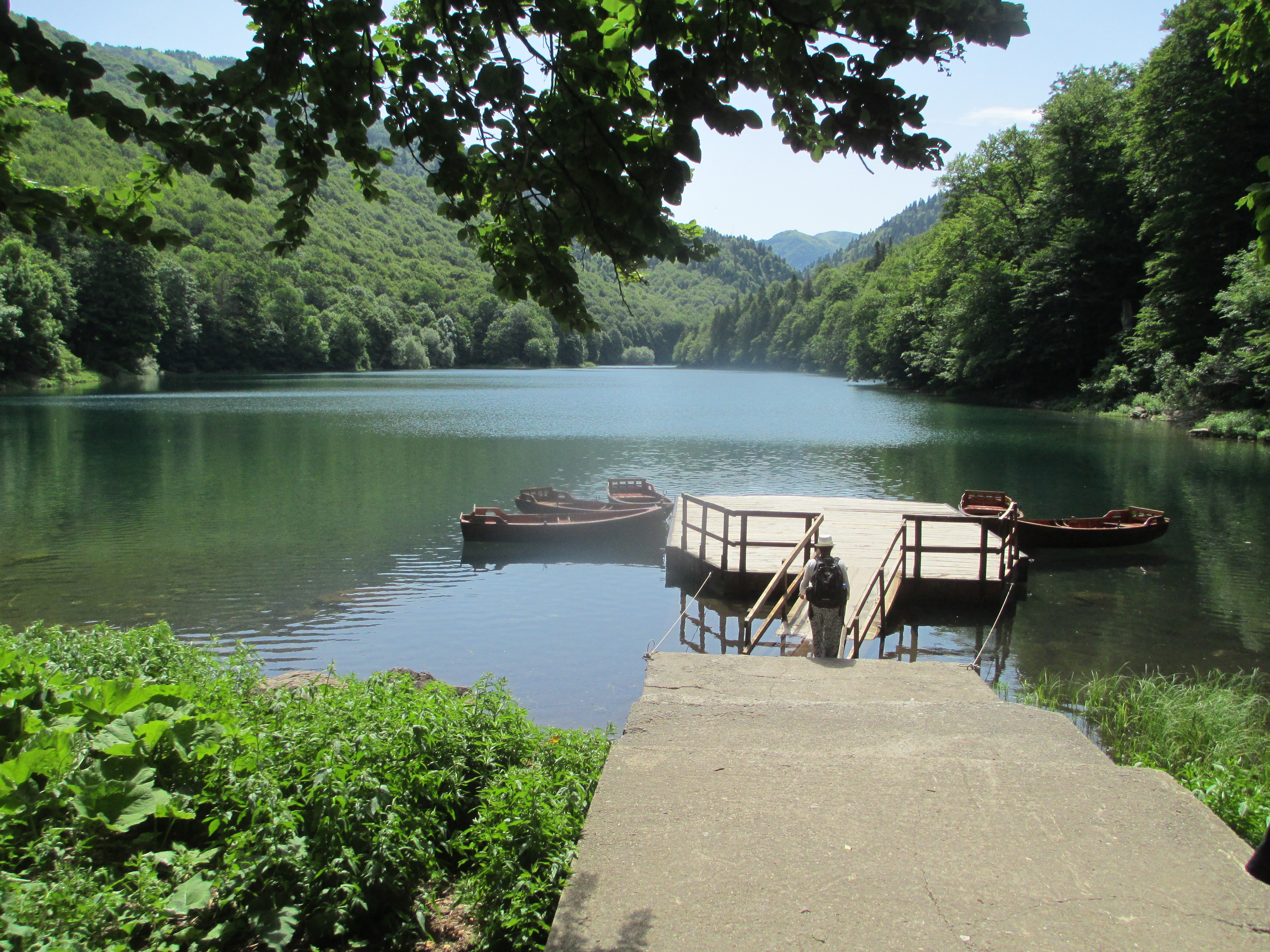

- Location within Montenegro
- Location: Kolašin, northern Montenegro
- Coordinates: 42°53′52″N 19°36′2″E
- Type: Glacial lake
- Primary inflows: Biograd river
- Primary outflows: Jezerstica
- Basin countries: Montenegro
- Max. length: 870 m (2,850 ft)
- Max. width: 261 m (856 ft)
- Surface area: 228,500 m^{2} (2,460,000 sq ft)
- Average depth: 4.5 m (15 ft)
- Max. depth: 12.1 m (40 ft)
- Water volume: 1,052,763 cubic metres (37,178,000 cu ft)
- Surface elevation: 1,094 m (3,589 ft)

Lake Biograd (Montenegrin: Биоградско језеро, romanized: Biogradsko jezero) is a lake in Kolašin Municipality, northern Montenegro. It is a glacial lake, located on the western slope of Bjelasica Mountain, within the Biogradska Gora National Park.

== Geography ==
Lake Biograd is located in the centre of the Biogradska Gora National Park at an altitude of 1,094 metres (3,589 ft) above sea level. It is largest of the 5 high-altitude glacial lakes park with a surface area 228,500 square metres and a volume of 1,052,763 cubic metres. The lake's maximum depth is 12.1 m, while the average depth is 4.5 m. The lake is 870 m long and 261 m wide.

It is filled by the Biograd river, a permanent tributary about 8km long, and a few permanent and periodic streams. Its outflow tributary is the Jezerštica.
