= Štitari, Berane =

Štitari Штитари
- Village
- Location within Montenegro
- Coordinates: 42.943194°N 19.837495°E
- Country: Montenegro
- Municipality: Berane

Population (2023)
  - Total: 201
- Time zone: UTC+1 (CET)
  - Summer (DST): UTC+2 (CEST)

Štitari (Montenegrin: Штитари) is a village in the municipality of Berane, Montenegro.

== Demographics ==
According to the 2023 census, its population was 201.

Ethnicity in 2011
Ethnicity	Number	Percentage
Montenegrins	169	55.8%
Serbs	125	41.3%
other/undeclared	9	3.0%
Total	303	100%
