= Adriaphaenops njegosiensis =

Scientific classification
- Kingdom: Animalia
- Phylum: Arthropoda
- Class: Insecta
- Order: Coleoptera
- Suborder: Adephaga
- Family: Carabidae
- Genus: Adriaphaenops
- Species: A. njegosiensis

Binomial name
- Adriaphaenops njegosiensis Lohaj, Lakota, Quénnec, Pavićević & Čeplik, 2016
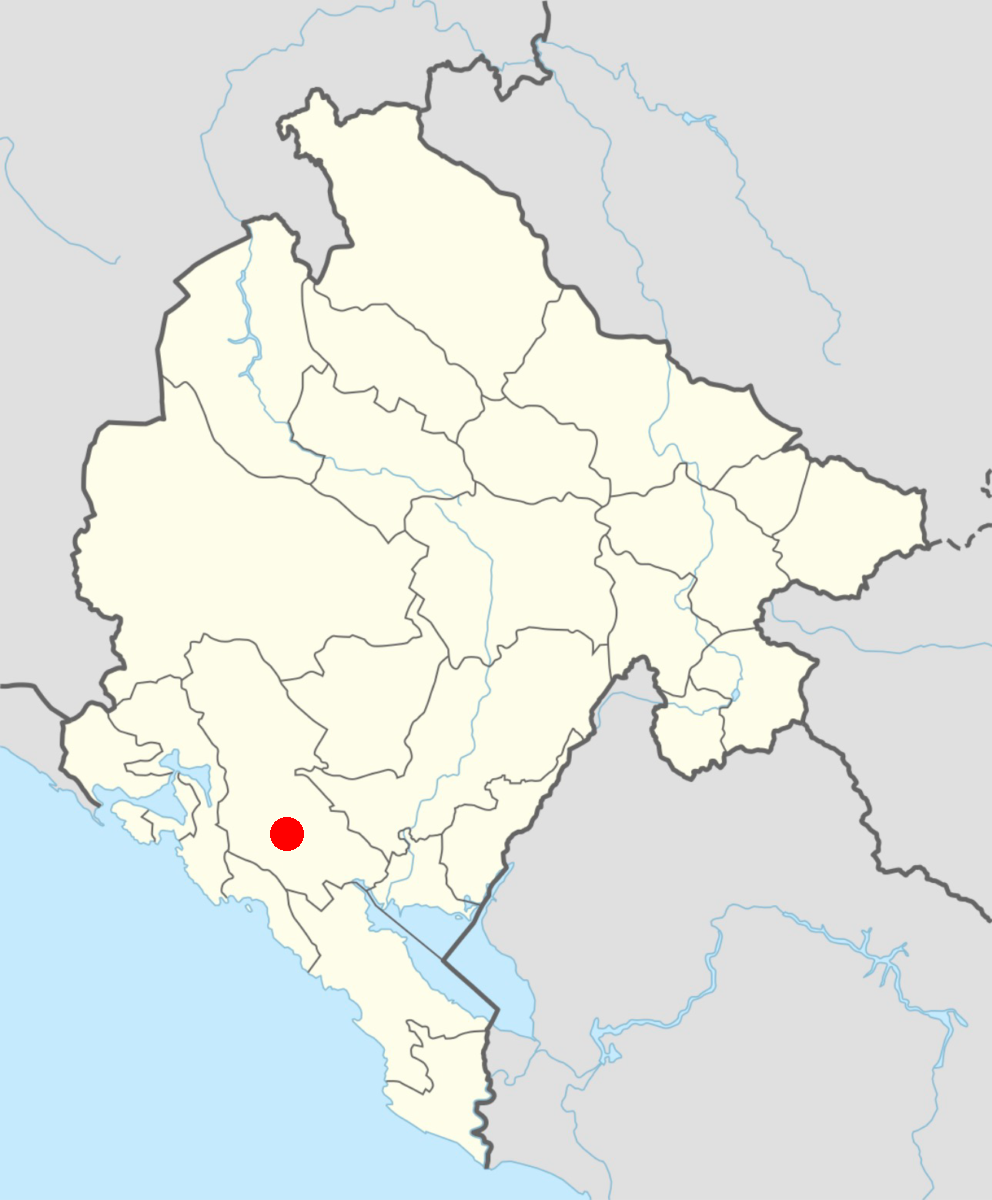
- Adriaphaenops njegosiensis holotype map

Species of beetle

Adriaphaenops njegosiensis is a species of a ground beetle in the family Carabidae. It is found in Montenegro.

== Distribution ==
This species is endemic to Montenegro, where it is known only from its type locality, the Cetinje Cave in Cetinje. The cave's ecosystem also hosts several other subterranean beetles, including species from the families Staphylinidae, Cholevidae, and Carabidae. The holotype was collected from a wet clay substrate in the cave's deepest main corridor.
