= Petnjik =

Petnjik Петњик
- Village
- Location within Montenegro
- Coordinates: 42°50′N 19°54′E
- Country: Montenegro
- Municipality: Berane

Population (2025)
  - Total: 804
- Time zone: UTC+1 (CET)
  - Summer (DST): UTC+2 (CEST)

Petnjik (Montenegrin: Петњик) is a village in the municipality of Berane, Montenegro.

It is mainly inhabited by people with the Barjaktarović and Babović surnames, while there are inhabitants with surnames: Nedovic, Anđić, Marinković, etc. The centre of the village is about 4.5 km from Berane.

== Demographics ==
According to the 2023 census, its population was 533.

Ethnicity in 2011
Ethnicity	Number	Percentage
Serbs	335	13.06%
Montenegrins	191	7.45%
Albanians	2017	78.63%
other/undeclared	24	0.94%
Total	2565	100%
