= Crematogaster algirica =

Scientific classification
- Domain: Eukaryota
- Kingdom: Animalia
- Phylum: Arthropoda
- Class: Insecta
- Order: Hymenoptera
- Family: Formicidae
- Subfamily: Myrmicinae
- Genus: Crematogaster
- Species: C. algirica

Binomial name
- Crematogaster algirica H. Lucas, 1849

Species of ant

Crematogaster algirica is a species of ant in tribe Crematogastrini. It was described by Hippolyte Lucas in 1849.
