= Podgora, Žabljak =

Podgora Подгора
- Village
- Location within Montenegro
- Coordinates: 43°11′55″N 19°9′15″E
- Country: Montenegro
- Region: Northern
- Municipality: Žabljak

Population (2011)
  - Total: 72
- Time zone: UTC+1 (CET)
  - Summer (DST): UTC+2 (CEST)

Podgora (Montenegrin Cyrillic: Подгора) is a village in the municipality of Žabljak, Montenegro.

== Demographics ==
According to the 2011 census, its population was 72.

Ethnicity in 2011
Ethnicity	Number	Percentage
Montenegrins	35	48.6%
Serbs	29	40.3%
other/undeclared	8	11.1%
Total	72	100%
