= Draba bertiscea =

Scientific classification
- Kingdom: Plantae
- Clade: Tracheophytes
- Clade: Angiosperms
- Clade: Eudicots
- Clade: Rosids
- Order: Brassicales
- Family: Brassicaceae
- Genus: Draba
- Species: D. bertiscea

Binomial name
- Draba bertiscea Lakusić & Stevanović

Species of flowering plant

Draba bertiscea is a species of flowering plant in the family Brassicaceae. It is a small, perennial herb known only from a single high mountain locality on Mount Prokletije in southeastern Montenegro.

== Taxonomy and systematics ==
Draba bertiscea was described as a species new to science in 1995 by botanists Dmitar Lakušić and Vladimir Stevanović. The specific epithet bertiscea is derived from the Latin name for Mount Prokletije, mons Bertiscus. The species belongs to Draba sect. Aizopsis and is part of the D. lasiocarpa complex distributed in the Balkan Peninsula. This species complex includes taxa such as D. scardica, D. compacta, D. boueana, D. athoa, and D. elongata. The authors note that D. bertiscea is morphologically most similar to D. compacta, particularly the Carpathian variety D. compacta var. pseudoaizoides.

The holotype was collected on Maja Kolata, Mount Prokletije, at 2,200 m (7,220 ft) altitude on 8 July 1988.

== Description ==
Draba bertiscea is a densely or laxly caespitose perennial herb. At anthesis it is 1.5–10 mm (0.059–0.394 in) tall, growing to 13 mm (0.51 in) when fruiting. It has a lignified taproot up to 2 mm (0.079 in) in diameter.

The rosette leaves are lanceolate or lingulate, rarely elliptical, measuring 2.5–9 mm (0.098–0.354 in) long by 0.8–2 mm (0.031–0.079 in) wide. They are glabrous, with margins that are typically without cilia (very rare exceptions exist).

The flowering scape is glabrous, bearing a condensed, corymbose inflorescence that becomes subcapitate in fruit. The plant produces 1–8 small flowers. The sepals are 1.1–2.1 mm (0.043–0.083 in) long, glabrous, with rounded apices and hyaline margins. The petals are yellow, lanceolate-obovate, measuring 2–4 mm (0.079–0.157 in) long. The stamens are 0.8–1.7 mm (0.031–0.067 in) long with anthers approximately 0.25 mm (0.0098 in) long.

The silicules are elliptical, glabrous, measuring 3–4 mm (0.12–0.16 in) long by 1.5–2 mm (0.059–0.079 in) wide, on pedicels 1.5–8 mm (0.059–0.315 in) long. The style is 0.3–0.6 mm (0.012–0.024 in) long. The seeds are ovate, approximately 0.7 mm (0.028 in) long.

== Distribution and habitat ==
Draba bertiscea is endemic to Montenegro and is known only from its type locality on the Maja Kolata peak of the Prokletije massif in the southeastern part of the country.

It grows in fixed, calcareous screes around persistent snow patches at approximately 2,200 m (7,220 ft) altitude. The habitat is a north-facing, slightly inclined slope on dolomitic limestone. The site is covered by snow until late June or July, resulting in a short growing season of 3–4 months. Associated species include Trifolium pallescens, Plantago atrata, Dryas octopetala, Salix retusa, and Polygonum viviparum. The species is sympatric with the related Draba compacta, which inhabits south-facing rocky ground.
