= Kameno, Herceg Novi =

Village in Herceg Novi, Montenegro

Kameno Камено
- Village
- Interactive map of Kameno
- Location within Montenegro
- Coordinates: 42.478890°N 18.529482°E
- Country: Montenegro
- Region: Coastal
- Municipality: Herceg Novi

Population (2011)
  - Total: 128
- Time zone: UTC+1 (CET)
  - Summer (DST): UTC+2 (CEST)

Kameno (Montenegrin: Камено) is a village in the municipality of Herceg Novi, Montenegro.

== Demographics ==
According to the 2011 census, its population was 128.

Ethnicity in 2011
Ethnicity	Number	Percentage
Serbs	81	63.3%
Montenegrins	27	21.1%
other/undeclared	20	15.6%
Total	128	100%
