= Goražde, Berane Municipality =

Goražde Горажде
- Village
- Location within Montenegro
- Coordinates: 42.879754°N 19.928432°E
- Country: Montenegro
- Municipality: Berane

Population (2023)
  - Total: 353
- Time zone: UTC+1 (CET)
  - Summer (DST): UTC+2 (CEST)

Goražde (Serbian Cyrillic: Горажде) is a village in the municipality of Berane, Montenegro.

== Demographics ==
According to the 2023 census, its population was 353.

.

Ethnicity in 2011
Ethnicity	Number	Percentage
Serbs	281	66.4%
Montenegrins	125	29.6%
other/undeclared	17	4.0%
Total	423	100%
