= Bjelasica =

Mountain range

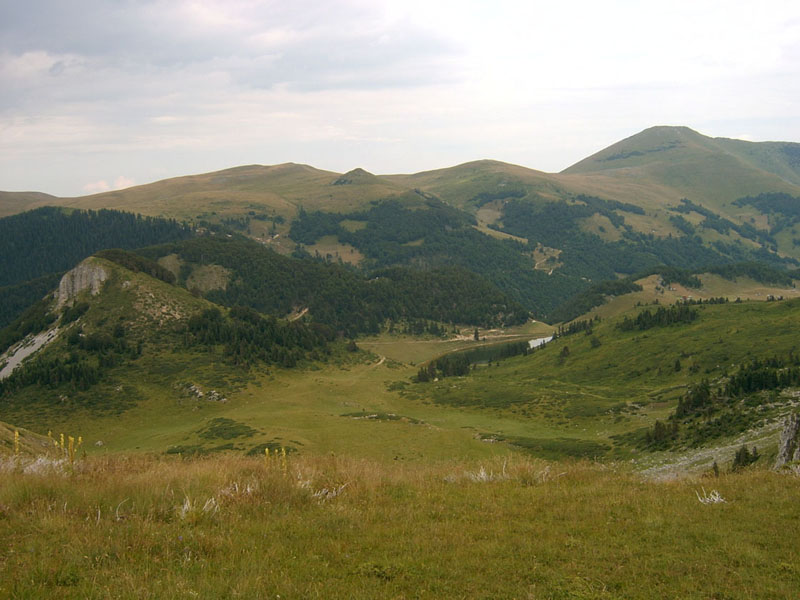
- Bjelasica in August

Highest point
- Elevation: 2,139 m (7,018 ft)
- Coordinates: 42°52′00″N 19°41′53″E

Geography
- Location within Montenegro
- Location: Montenegro

Bjelasica (Montenegrin: Бјеласица, pronounced [bjɛlǎsitsa]) is a mountain range located in the Biogradska Gora national park near Kolašin, Montenegro. The highest point of Bjelasica is Crna Glava ("Black Head"), which is 2,139 m (7,018 ft) high.

== Features ==
The area of the mountain range is 630 km^{2} (240 sq mi), with an equal width and length of 30 km. The entire mountain range divides into four expanses, which stretch from the NW to the SE. Its geological features are of volcanic origins, with smooth round shapes and mildly rolling landscape, differing from most of Montenegro's other mountains of calcareous composition abounding in karst forms, with numerous crevasses and crevices.

The range is bordered by Lim and Tara rivers. It is located in 5 of Montenegro's 21 municipalities: Kolašin (for the most part), Mojkovac, Bijelo Polje, Berane, and Andrijevica.

=== Peaks ===
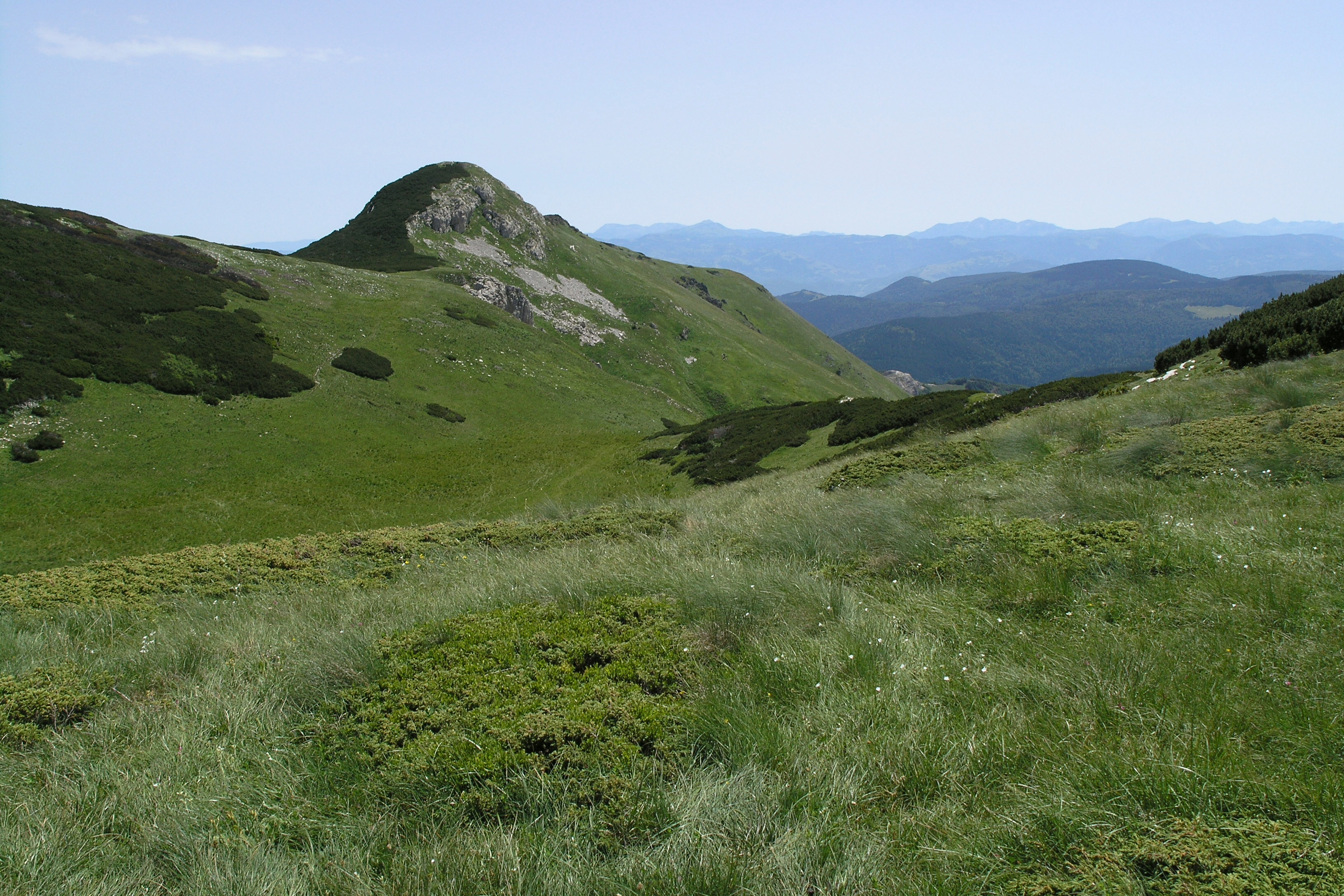
Crna Glava

The massif of Mt Bjelasica has 10 peaks above 2,000 m (6,562 ft), namely:

- Crna Glava 2,139 m (7,018 ft)
- Strmenica 2,122 m (6,962 ft)
- Zekova Glava 2,117 m (6,946 ft)
- Kosara 2,079 m (6,821 ft)
- Troglava 2,072 m (6,798 ft)
- Pešica Glava 2,056 m (6,745 ft)
- Strmni Pad 2,050 m (6,726 ft)
- Razvršje 2,033 m (6,670 ft)
- Potrkovo 2,009 m (6,591 ft)
- Crna Lokva 2,008 m (6,588 ft)

=== Lakes ===
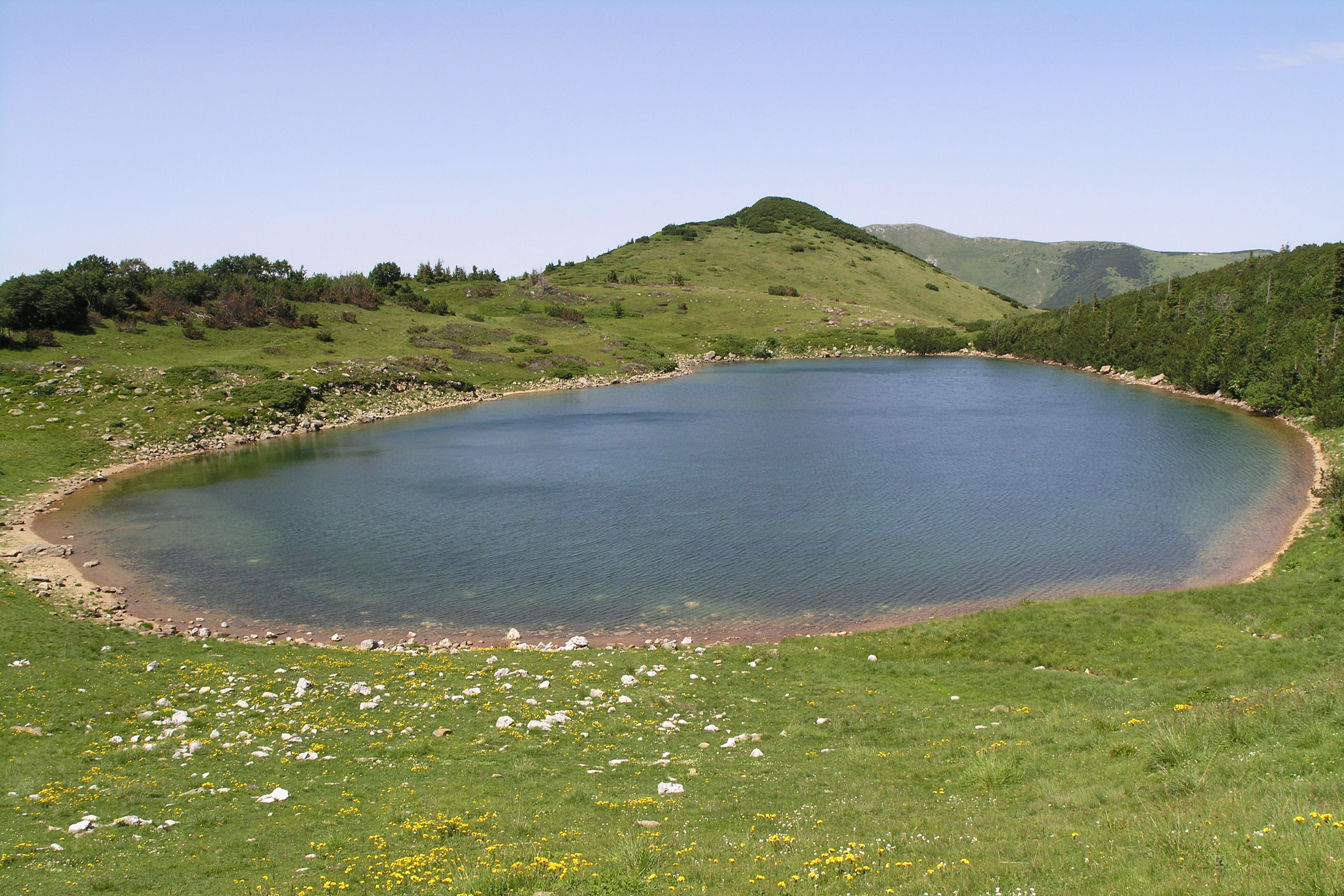
Lake Ursulovačko

Mt Bjelasica is home to 6 glacial lakes:

- Lake Biograd
- Lake Pešića
- Lake Ursulovačko
- Lake Šiško
- Lake Malo Šiško
- Lake Malo Ursulovačko

== Tourism ==
Bjelasica, alongside Durmitor, is the center of Montenegrin mountain tourism. It has the advantage of being easily accessible, as the town of Kolašin is situated on both the main road from Podgorica to Serbia and on the Belgrade–Bar railway.

As a skiing and snowboarding destination, Bjelasica is home to Kolašin 1450, a popular ski center with modern chairlifts and infrastructure. The town of Kolašin is some 10km from the ski center, and some excellent lodging facilities have been built there in recent years.

In recent years, Bjelasica is becoming popular as a summer destination, as it is suitable for ecotourism, hiking, mountaineering and recreational tourism in general. Lodging in authentic huts in katuns is an increasingly popular option during the summer. Due to the beautiful landscape, richness in lakes and streams, and ease of access, the mountain has great potential for the development of tourism.

== See also ==
- Biogradska Gora
- Lake Biograd
- Kolašin
