= Lubnice, Berane Municipality =

Lubnice Лубнице
- Village
- Location within Montenegro
- Coordinates: 42.858700°N 19.767914°E
- Country: Montenegro
- Municipality: Berane

Population (2023)
  - Total: 175
- Time zone: UTC+1 (CET)
  - Summer (DST): UTC+2 (CEST)

Lubnice (Serbian Cyrillic: Лубнице) is a village in the municipality of Berane, Montenegro.

== Demographics ==
According to the 2023 census, its population was 175.

Ethnicity in 2011
Ethnicity	Number	Percentage
Serbs	118	51.5%
Montenegrins	108	47.2%
other/undeclared	3	1.3%
Total	229	100%
