= Cetinjella =

Scientific classification
- Kingdom: Animalia
- Phylum: Arthropoda
- Clade: Pancrustacea
- Class: Malacostraca
- Order: Isopoda
- Suborder: Oniscidea
- Family: Trichoniscidae
- Genus: Cetinjella; Karaman & Horvatović, 2018
- Species: C. monasterii

Binomial name
- Cetinjella monasterii Karaman & Horvatović, 2018

Genus of isopods

Cetinjella is a monotypic genus of isopods in the family Trichoniscidae, containing the single species Cetinjella monasterii. It was first described by Karaman and Hovratović in 2018, and has only been found in Montenegro.
