= Komovi =

Mountain range in Montenegro

- Комови
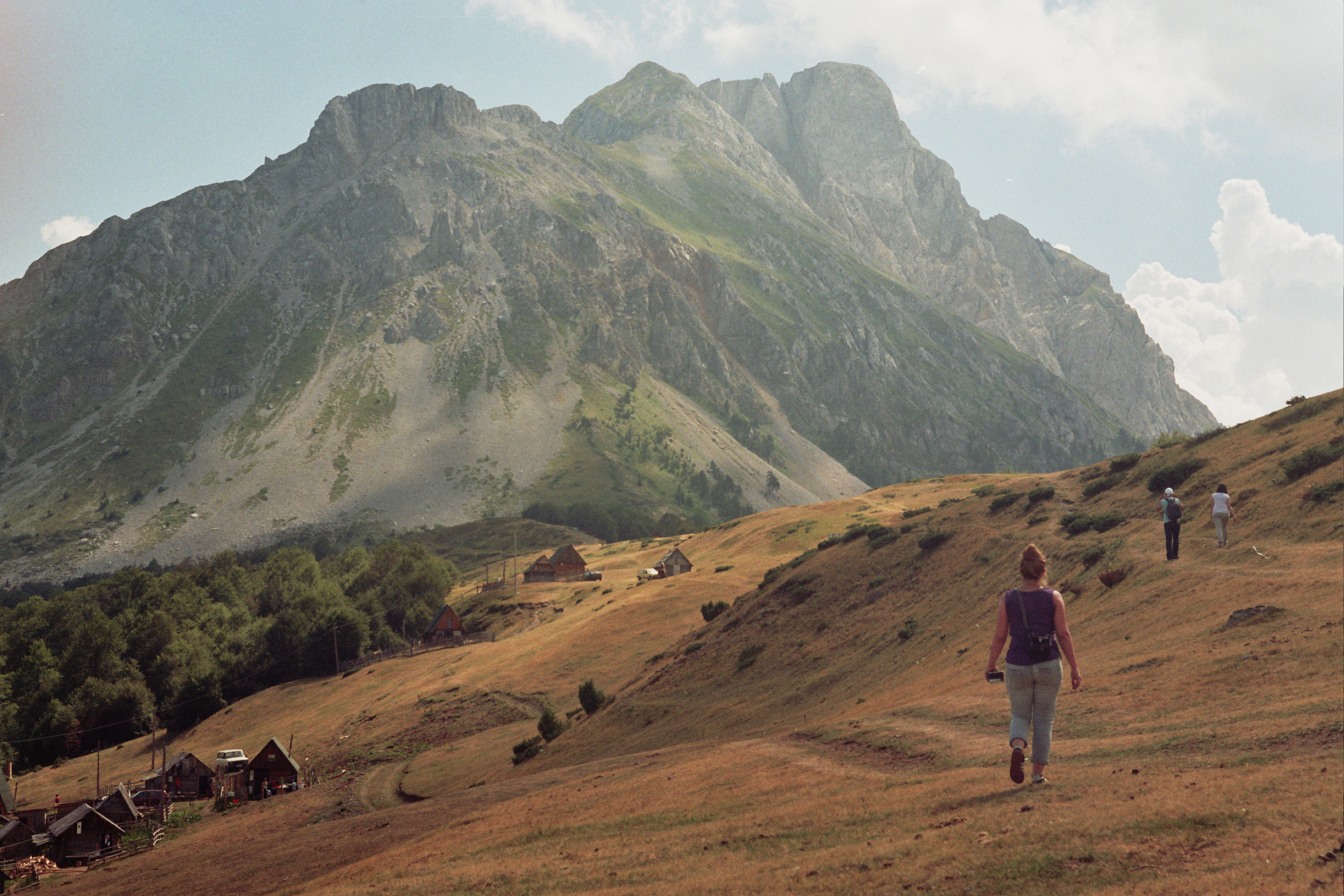

Highest point
- Elevation: 2,487 m (8,159 ft)
- Prominence: 1,131 m (3,711 ft)
- Listing: Ribu
- Coordinates: 42°40′51″N 19°38′29″E

Geography
- Location within Montenegro
- Location: Montenegro
- Parent range: Dinaric Alps

Komovi (Montenegrin Cyrillic: Комови) is a mountain and mountain range in eastern Montenegro. It is a part of the Dinaric Alps. Its highest peak, Kom Kučki, reaches a height of 2,487 m (8,159 ft).

The Komovi are located between the Montenegrin-Albanian Accursed Mountains range which borders them to the south and east, the Bjelasica mountain to the north, and Tara river to the west. Administratively, the Komovi mountains are divided between the municipalities of Kolašin and Andrijevica. Traditionally, the Komovi massif was the location of katuns (groups of shepherds' summer cottages) used by the Montenegrin tribes of Vasojevići and Kuči.

Since 2018, the Komovi have been classified as a nature park, i.e. as a protected natural area, due to their ecological significance, and abundance of the flora and fauna.

== Peaks ==
The six highest peaks of the Komovi are:

- Kom Kučki 2,487 m (8,159 ft)
- Stari vrh 2,483 m (8,146 ft)
- Kom Ljevorečki 2,469 m (8,100 ft)
- Kom Vasojevićki 2,461 m (8,074 ft)
- Rogamski vrh 2,303 m (7,556 ft)
- Bavan 2,252 m (7,388 ft)
