= Batrisodes venyivi =

"Batrisodes venyivi" Helotes mold beetle

Conservation status
- Endangered (ESA)

Scientific classification
- Kingdom: Animalia
- Phylum: Arthropoda
- Class: Insecta
- Order: Coleoptera
- Suborder: Polyphaga
- Infraorder: Staphyliniformia
- Family: Staphylinidae
- Genus: Batrisodes
- Species: B. venyivi

Binomial name
- Batrisodes venyivi Chandler, 1992

Species of beetle

Batrisodes venyivi, also known as Helotes mold beetle, is an eyeless beetle in the family Staphylinidae. They are found exclusively in the dark zones of caves in the Southwest region of Texas. More specifically, they have been found in eight caves throughout Bexar County, Texas. Similar species include the eight other Bexar County invertebrates, such as Rhadine exilis or Rhadine infernalis. All nine of these species are protected under the Endangered Species Act. Despite the efforts of a small number of researchers, the logistical challenges of accessing this habitat greatly limit the amount and type of information. Very little is known of the species' behavior, population trends, or general ecology.

== Description ==
The Helotes mold beetles average about two millimeters in length. No current information is available about the coloration of the Helotes mold beetles.

The Helotes mold beetles are eyeless arthropods. There are 5 species of 'Batrisodes' in the Edwards Plateau region that typically differ from their usual species traits. The species in this region have abnormally long antennae and legs. Additionally, the species that live under these conditions often develop elongated sensory setae that enable them to attach to irregular cave surfaces.

== Ecology ==
=== Diet ===
Helotes mold beetles are omnivores. They consume animal or plant materials that have been transported via water or wind to their habitats. They play an important role in their ecosystem, as they eat invertebrates such as mites, springtails, and cave crickets. In addition, they are eaten by other invertebrates and vertebrates in caves. Their overall role in their ecosystem is still in the process of being researched by scientists, but they are a large part of the food chain in Bexar County, Texas.

=== Habitat ===
The Helotes mold beetles live in underground habitats with high humidity and stable temperatures. They are found in the dark regions of caves, often under rocks. They exhibit troglobitic traits, such as absent or reduced eyes, long antennae, legs, and sensory setae (hair-like structures). Previous studies show that troglobitic arthropods thrive in higher humidity and lower air temperatures, which explains their necessity for deep cave conditions. Because of this, the Helotes mold beetles are most commonly found in the southwestern region of Texas.

There are current efforts to conserve and protect these habitats under the Bexar County Karst Invertebrate Recovery Plan. See Human Impact and Current Conservation Efforts for more information.

=== Range ===
Helotes mold beetles are commonly found in eight caves throughout the southwest region of Texas, more specifically Bexar County, where they were first collected in 1984. When they were first discovered, they were only found in six caves, but have since been found in two more in the area. However, troglobites, like the Helotes mold beetle, cannot travel between cave systems and are endemic to a single cave or cave system. Their specific habitat requirements and their troglobitic characteristics make the range of the species very small. Because of this, the species is facing habitat loss due to increased urbanization and population growth in Bexar County. There is little evidence that indicates the Helotes mold beetles have occurred elsewhere in Texas (for a range map see).

=== Historic and current population size ===
The Helotes mold beetles are known to live in stressful conditions as their habitats are commonly impacted by urbanization. Their range is limited, and they are sparsely found in southwestern Texas. Due to the difficulty in accessing their habitats, a specific estimation of their population size seems to be unknown to researchers. In 2000, the Helotes mold beetle was recognized by the Endangered Species Act.

== Life history ==
Information about the reproduction of the Helotes mold beetle is largely unknown because it is such a small and rare species. The following information is about two similar species, the Coffin Cave mold beetle, Batrisodes texanus, and the Kretschmarr Cave mold beetle, Texamaurops reddelli.

=== Helotes mold beetle ===
Little is known about the daily lives of the Helotes mold beetles and similar karst invertebrates because of their secretive habitats. There does not seem to be a distinct reproduction pattern for this species, and they may reproduce at any time during the year if steady conditions remain present in the caves.

=== General Batrisode beetles ===
Batrisode beetles can be sexually dimorphic, meaning that sexes of the same species exhibit different characteristics. Males tend to reach sexual maturity at a smaller size than females. While information about the reproductive process for Batrisode beetles is largely unknown, it is likely that this species of beetle engages in a similar lifestyle to that of beetles in general. This means that a male and a female mate, the female lays an egg, the egg hatches, and the young beetle grows to become a fully developed adult. The adult will eventually find another mate to restart the cycle.

== Conservation ==
The Helotes mold beetle was listed as endangered in 2000 and is currently protected under the Endangered Species Act. Large amounts of land in Bexar County are privately owned, making cooperative conservation efforts difficult and essential to the conservation of the species. Three of the caves that the species inhabits have been purchased to minimize damage from urbanization. Preserving these caves and thus protecting the genetic diversity and ensuring long-term survival is essential.

=== Human impact on the species ===
The rapid urbanization of the land around the city of San Antonio has greatly impacted this species. Urbanization has proceeded largely unregulated both before and after the listing of the species. Thus, the number of suitable cave preservation sites is likely dwindling by the minute. Caves and other suitable karst habitats are vanishing due to human overtake during development, and quarrying the rock from which they are comprised. The filling, or altering cave entrances, is extremely destructive and results in habitat loss. Examples of this may include alternating drainage patterns, reducing or increasing nutrient flow, altering native surface plant and animal communities, contamination, and the competition and predation of invasive, non-native species.

In 2012, the U.S. Fish and Wildlife Service was tasked with building a critical habitat for the nine Bexar County invertebrates, including the Helotes mold beetle. They held a public hearing in 2011 to discuss the proposed critical habitat and took public word into consideration. This enabled the government to purchase more of the privately owned critical habitat for conservation.

=== Major threats ===
There are several major threats to the Helotes mold beetle. Changes to a cave's surface or underground drainage basin can hurt a beetle habitat. This generally occurs from development activities that might affect the quality of hydrologic inputs into the karst ecosystem. The Helotes mold beetles are reliant on buffers in the form of plant communities. Without these native plant communities present, it becomes more difficult to maintain microclimatic conditions. Urbanization also poses a threat to the Helotes mold beetle because it alters cave entrances, infiltrates cave water, decreases connectivity among populations, and degrades surface habitats. All of these effects ultimately reduce Helotes mold beetle population status and the species' long-term persistence.

=== History of ESA and IUCN listings ===
The Helotes mold beetles were listed (as of 12/26/2000) as endangered wherever found in the ESA. They were first collected in 1984 and later rediscovered by Chandler. It was Chandler's descriptions that prompted a petition by the U.S. Fish and Wildlife Services to list the Helotes mold beetles. At the time of its original listing, the Batrisodes venyivi was only known in six caves. The species later appeared on the federal register in 1994. In a recovery plan from 2011, it was detailed that these beetles inhabit eight caves around Bexar, Texas, yet they remain endangered. On 8/27/2002, there was a proposal for the designation of critical habitat for the species. Additionally, a final recovery outline plan was developed and published on 9/12/2011.

The IUCN does not currently have a listing for this species.

=== Current conservation efforts ===
A critical habitat designation for the Helotes mold beetle was proposed to preserve habitat areas and support populations that represent the genetic diversity of the species.

In 2011, the Bexar County Karst Invertebrates Recovery Plan was published. In this plan, the Helotes mold beetle is listed as a priority 2C, with 1 being the highest priority and 18 being the lowest priority, due to a moderate degree of threat and low recovery potential. The recovery strategy states that karst fauna areas should adhere to the following objectives:

- Establish sufficient quantity of moisture to karst ecosystems
- Maintain stable in-cave temperatures
- Limit red-imported fire ant predation/competition
- Provide adequate nutrient input to karst ecosystems
- Protect caves as they serve as migration routes for karst invertebrates
- Ensure that preserves are large enough to withstand random or catastrophic events
- Minimize the amount of active management needed for each preserve
- Maintain adequate populations of native plant and animal communities

The long-term targets of this recovery plan include maintaining high numbers of Helotes mold beetles through trend monitoring of cave species, research on the species' genetic diversity, and educating the public about karst biology. The short-term efforts of this plan include designing preserves that meet the species needs to breed and protect the surface drainage basins and ensuring that karst fauna areas are far enough apart so that catastrophic events do not overtake all of them at once. Additionally, this plan involves monitoring population statuses to document loss/growth and applying adaptive management strategies to limit human intervention in Helotes mold beetles' habitats. Both short-term and long-term strategies are implemented to create high quality karst fauna areas and increase probability of species survival, so the Batrisodes venyivi can be delisted in the future.
