= Seracamaurops rumijaensis =

Scientific classification
- Kingdom: Animalia
- Phylum: Arthropoda
- Class: Insecta
- Order: Coleoptera
- Suborder: Polyphaga
- Infraorder: Staphyliniformia
- Family: Staphylinidae
- Subfamily: Pselaphinae
- Supertribe: Batrisitae
- Tribe: Amauropini
- Genus: Seracamaurops
- Species: S. rumijaensis

Binomial name
- Seracamaurops rumijaensis (Lohaj, Pavićević & Lakota, 2023)
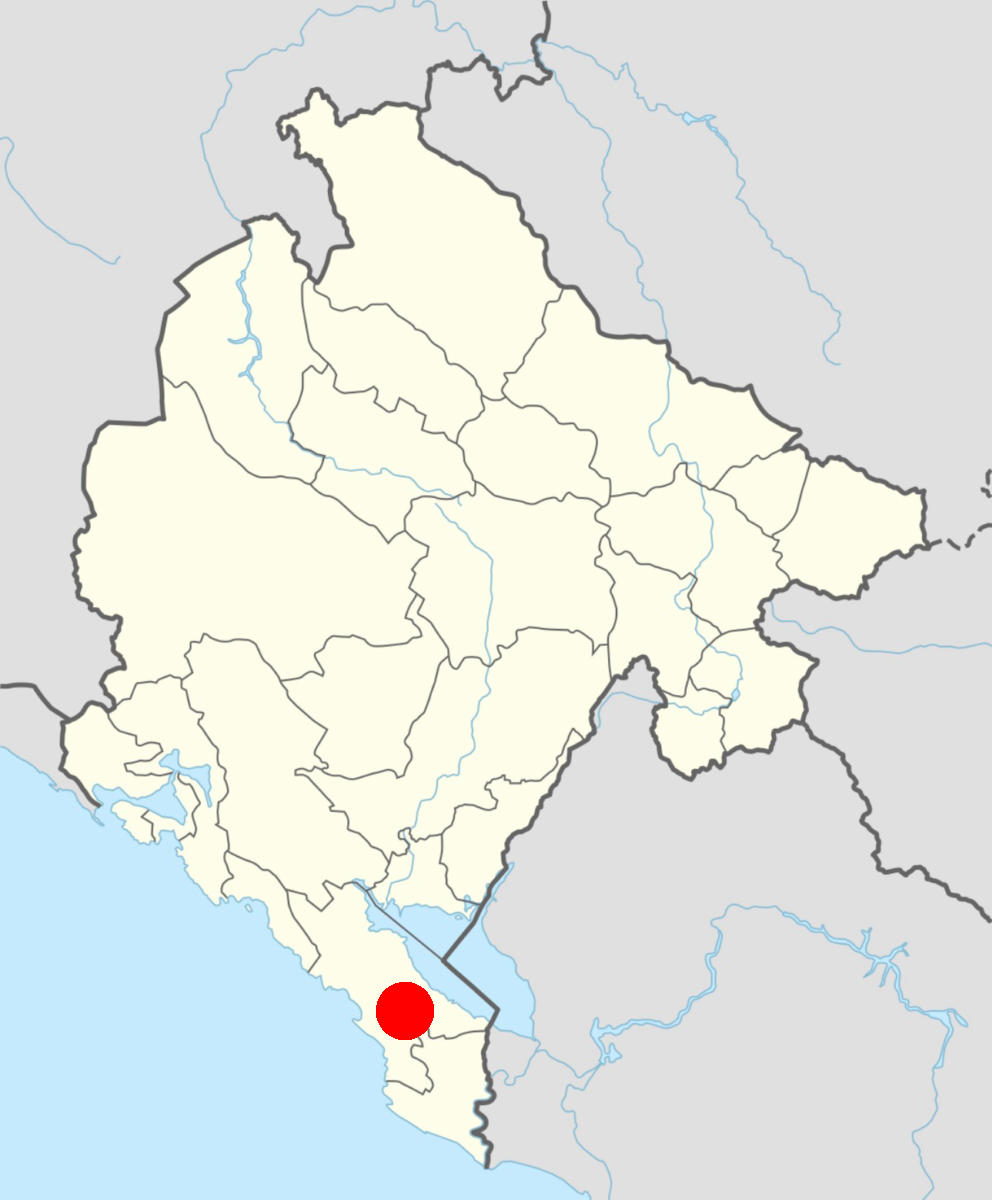

Species of beetle

Seracamaurops rumijaensis is a species of rove beetle in the family Staphylinidae.

== Distribution ==
This species is endemic to southern Montenegro, where it is known only from two pits on Mount Rumija: Phoenix and Ice Virgin. It shares its subterranean habitat with several other beetle species, including the carabids Adriaphaenops rumijaensis and Neotrechus suturalis, and various leptodirine beetles from the family Leiodidae.
