= Pseudamaurops =

Scientific classification
- Kingdom: Animalia
- Phylum: Arthropoda
- Class: Insecta
- Order: Coleoptera
- Suborder: Polyphaga
- Infraorder: Staphyliniformia
- Family: Staphylinidae
- Subfamily: Pselaphinae
- Supertribe: Batrisitae
- Tribe: Amauropini
- Genus: Pseudamaurops; Jeannel, 1948

Genus of beetles

Pseudamaurops is a genus of beetles belonging to the family Staphylinidae.

== Systematics ==
Eight species haeg been assigned to the genus Pseudamaurops:

- Pseudamaurops albanicus
- Pseudamaurops brachati
- Pseudamaurops calcaratus
- Pseudamaurops graecus
- Pseudamaurops hristovskii
- Pseudamaurops muelleriana
- Pseudamaurops transversalis
- Pseudamaurops tymficus
