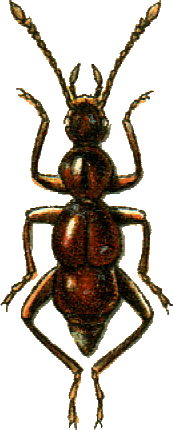
- Bergrothia saulcyi

Scientific classification
- Kingdom: Animalia
- Phylum: Arthropoda
- Clade: Pancrustacea
- Class: Insecta
- Order: Coleoptera
- Suborder: Polyphaga
- Infraorder: Staphyliniformia
- Family: Staphylinidae
- Subfamily: Pselaphinae
- Supertribe: Batrisitae
- Tribe: Amauropini
- Genus: Bergrothia; Reitter, 1884

Synonyms
- Amicrops Saulcy, 1880; Bergrothiella Reitter, 1898

= Bergrothia =

Genus of beetles

Bergrothia is a genus of beetles belonging to the family Staphylinidae.

Species:

- Bergrothia adzharica Hlaváč, 2004
- Bergrothia barbakadzei Maghradze, Faille, Barjadze & Hlaváč, 2019
- Bergrothia lederi (Saulcy, 1880)
- Bergrothia lenkorana (Reitter, 1882)
- Bergrothia mingrelica (Reitter, 1885)
- Bergrothia saulcyi (Reitter, 1877)
- Bergrothia solodovnikovi Hlaváč, 2004
