= Batrisodes =

Scientific classification
- Kingdom: Animalia
- Phylum: Arthropoda
- Class: Insecta
- Order: Coleoptera
- Suborder: Polyphaga
- Infraorder: Staphyliniformia
- Family: Staphylinidae
- Subfamily: Pselaphinae
- Supertribe: Batrisitae
- Tribe: Batrisini
- Subtribe: Batrisina
- Genus: Batrisodes; Reitter, 1882

Synonyms
- Batrisodinus Jeannel, 1950

Genus of beetles

Batrisodes is a genus of ant-loving beetles in the family Staphylinidae. There are at least 80 described species in Batrisodes.

== Species ==
These 89 species belong to the genus Batrisodes:

- Batrisodes adnexus (Hampe, 1863)^{g}
- Batrisodes albionicus (Aubé, 1833)^{i c g b}
- Batrisodes antennatus Schaeffer, 1906^{i c g}
- Batrisodes aphenogastri Fall, 1912^{i c g}
- Batrisodes auerbachi Park, 1956^{i c g}
- Batrisodes babaianus Nomura, 2007^{g}
- Batrisodes barri Park, 1958^{i c g}
- Batrisodes beyeri Schaeffer, 1906^{i c g b}
- Batrisodes bistriatus (LeConte, 1849)^{i c g}
- Batrisodes buqueti (Aubé, 1833)^{g}
- Batrisodes cartwrighti Sanderson, 1940^{i c g}
- Batrisodes cavernosus Park, 1951^{i c g}
- Batrisodes cavicornis (Casey, 1897)^{i c g}
- Batrisodes cicatricosus (Brendel, 1891)^{i c g}
- Batrisodes clypeonotus (Brendel, 1893)^{i c g}
- Batrisodes clypeospecus Park, 1960^{i c g}
- Batrisodes declivis Casey, 1908^{i c g b}
- Batrisodes delaporti (Aubé, 1833)^{g}
- Batrisodes denticauda (Casey, 1894)^{i c g}
- Batrisodes denticollis (Casey, 1884)^{i c g b}
- Batrisodes elysius (Reitter, 1884)^{g}
- Batrisodes exsculptus (Hampe, 1850)^{g}
- Batrisodes ferulifer Park, 1960^{i c g}
- Batrisodes festinatus Park, 1956^{i c g}
- Batrisodes fossicauda (Casey, 1897)^{i c g}
- Batrisodes foveicornis (Casey, 1887)^{i c g}
- Batrisodes frontalis (LeConte, 1849)^{i c g b}
- Batrisodes furcatus (Brendel, 1891)^{i c g}
- Batrisodes gemmoides Park, 1960^{i c g}
- Batrisodes gemmus Park, 1956^{i c g}
- Batrisodes grubbsi Chandler, 1992^{i c g}
- Batrisodes hairstoni Park, 1947^{i c g}
- Batrisodes henroti Park, 1956^{i c g}
- Batrisodes hubenthali Reitter, 1913^{g}
- Batrisodes hubrichti Park, 1958^{i c g}
- Batrisodes indistinctus Grigarick and Schuster, 1962^{i c g}
- Batrisodes insularis (Baudi di Selve, 1869)^{g}
- Batrisodes ionae (LeConte, 1849)^{i c g b}
- Batrisodes jocuvestus Park, 1960^{i c g}
- Batrisodes jonesi Park, 1951^{i c g}
- Batrisodes juvencus (Brendel, 1865)^{i c g}
- Batrisodes krekeleri Park, 1960^{i c g}
- Batrisodes lineaticollis (Aubé, 1833)^{i c g b}
- Batrisodes lustrans Casey, 1908^{i c g}
- Batrisodes martini Grigarick and Schuster, 1962^{i c g}
- Batrisodes masatakai Nomura, 2007^{g}
- Batrisodes mendocino (Casey, 1886)^{i c g b}
- Batrisodes mississippiensis Park, 1956^{i c g}
- Batrisodes monticola (Casey, 1886)^{i c g}
- Batrisodes nebulosus Grigarick and Schuster, 1962^{i c g}
- Batrisodes nigricans (LeConte, 1849)^{i c g}
- Batrisodes obscurus Grigarick and Schuster, 1962^{i c g}
- Batrisodes occiduus (Casey, 1886)^{i c g}
- Batrisodes oculatus (Aubé, 1833)^{g}
- Batrisodes opacus Grigarick and Schuster, 1962^{i c g}
- Batrisodes oro Chandler, 1983^{i c g}
- Batrisodes paganettii W.Blattny & C.Blattny, 1916^{g}
- Batrisodes pannosus Park, 1960^{i c g}
- Batrisodes pogonatus (Saulcy, 1874)^{g}
- Batrisodes profundus Park, 1956^{i c g}
- Batrisodes punctifrons (Casey, 1887)^{i c g}
- Batrisodes reyesi Chandler, 1992^{i c g}
- Batrisodes riparius (Say, 1824)^{i c g}
- Batrisodes rossi Park, 1947^{i c g}
- Batrisodes scabriceps (LeConte, 1849)^{i c g}
- Batrisodes schaefferi Park, 1947^{i c g}
- Batrisodes schaumi (Aubé, 1844)^{i c g}
- Batrisodes schmitti (Casey, 1897)^{i c g}
- Batrisodes sinuatifrons (Brendel, 1893)^{i c g}
- Batrisodes speculum (Casey, 1886)^{i c g}
- Batrisodes specus Park, 1951^{i c g}
- Batrisodes spinifer (Brendel, 1887)^{i c g}
- Batrisodes spretus (LeConte, 1849)^{i c g}
- Batrisodes striatus (LeConte, 1849)^{i c g}
- Batrisodes subterraneus Park, 1951^{i c g}
- Batrisodes sulcaticeps Besuchet, 1981^{g}
- Batrisodes temporalis (Casey, 1897)^{i c g}
- Batrisodes texanus Chandler, 1992^{i c g b} (Coffin Cave mold beetle)
- Batrisodes tulareanus Casey, 1908^{i c g}
- Batrisodes tumoris Park, 1960^{i c g}
- Batrisodes uncicornis (Casey, 1897)^{i c g}
- Batrisodes unisexualis Besuchet, 1988^{g}
- Batrisodes valentinei Park, 1951^{i c g}
- Batrisodes venustus (Reichenbach, 1816)^{g}
- Batrisodes venyivi Chandler, 1992^{i c g b} (helotes mold beetle)
- Batrisodes virginiae (Casey, 1884)^{i c}
- Batrisodes wardi Chandler, 2003^{i c g}
- Batrisodes yanaorum Chandler, 2003^{i c g}
- Batrisodes zephyrinus (Casey, 1886)^{i c g}

Data sources: i = ITIS, c = Catalogue of Life, g = GBIF, b = Bugguide.net
