= Arthmius =

Scientific classification
- Kingdom: Animalia
- Phylum: Arthropoda
- Class: Insecta
- Order: Coleoptera
- Suborder: Polyphaga
- Infraorder: Staphyliniformia
- Family: Staphylinidae
- Subfamily: Pselaphinae
- Supertribe: Batrisitae
- Tribe: Batrisini
- Genus: Arthmius; LeConte, 1849

Genus of beetles

Arthmius is a genus of ant-loving beetles in the family Staphylinidae. There are about nine described species in Arthmius.

== Species ==
These nine species belong to the genus Arthmius:

- Arthmius bulbifer Casey, 1894
- Arthmius extraneus Fletcher
- Arthmius globicollis LeConte, 1849
- Arthmius gracilior Casey, 1884
- Arthmius involutus Casey, 1894
- Arthmius mancus Fletcher
- Arthmius morsus Fletcher, 1932
- Arthmius rubriculus Fletcher
- Arthmius subfusus Fletcher
