= Tribasodites =

Scientific classification
- Kingdom: Animalia
- Phylum: Arthropoda
- Class: Insecta
- Order: Coleoptera
- Suborder: Polyphaga
- Infraorder: Staphyliniformia
- Family: Staphylinidae
- Subfamily: Pselaphinae
- Supertribe: Batrisitae
- Tribe: Batrisini
- Genus: Tribasodites; Jeannel, 1960

Type species
- Tribasodites antennalis Jeannel, 1960

Species
- See text

Genus of beetle

Tribasodites is a genus of beetle in the family Staphylinidae.

== Species ==
Species accepted within Tribasodites include:

- Tribasodites abnormalis
- Tribasodites antennalis
- Tribasodites bama
- Tribasodites bedosae
- Tribasodites biyun
- Tribasodites cehengensis
- Tribasodites coiffaiti
- Tribasodites deharvengi
- Tribasodites frontalis
- Tribasodites hubeiensis
- Tribasodites kawadai
- Tribasodites liboensis
- Tribasodites picticornis
- Tribasodites semipunctatus
- Tribasodites setosiventris
- Tribasodites spinacaritus
- Tribasodites thailandicus
- Tribasodites tiani
- Tribasodites tianmuensis
- Tribasodites uenoi
- Tribasodites xingyiensis
