= Airmen's Cave =

Cave in Austin, Texas, United States

Airman's Cave
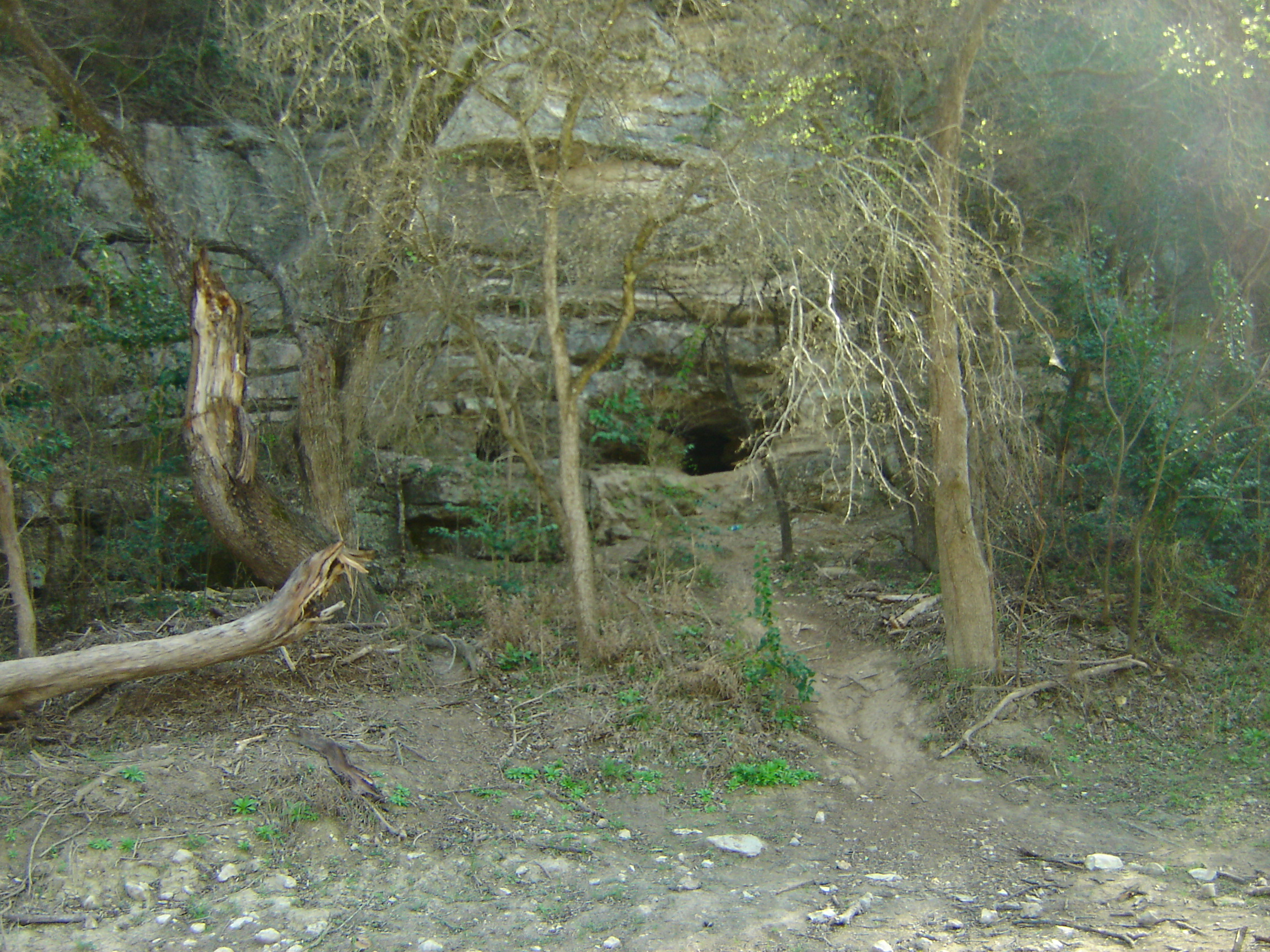

- Location within Texas
- Location: Austin, Texas, U.S.
- Coordinates: 30°14′30″N 97°47′30″W
- Depth: 9 metres (30 ft)
- Length: 3,444 metres (11,299 ft)
- Height variation: 15 metres (49 ft)
- Elevation: 170 metres (560 ft)
- Discovery: 1971
- Geology: Cretaceous limestone
- Entrances: 1
- Hazards: small passages
- Access: gated
- Cave survey: Un. Texas Grotto, NSS. 1974

Airman's Cave is a cave located adjacent to the portion of Barton Creek located in Travis County in south Austin, Texas. The cave is 3,444 metres (11,299 ft) long, and characterized by long crawls and tight passages. It lies inside the Barton Creek Greenbelt public park and is managed by the City of Austin's Parks and Recreation Department.

== Features ==
Airman's Cave is formed within the Edwards limestone of the early Cretaceous, and was originally a feeder for Barton Springs before the water table lowered and the stream found a different course. It is home to a number of rare troglobite species, including Rhadine austinica, Tartarocreagris intermedia, Texella spinoperca, and Texella mulaiki.

One of the more foreboding passages, found within sight of daylight, is the "Birth Canal": a tight, restricting tunnel that once discouraged many novice cavers from continuing further into the cave. Much deeper inside is a space known as the "Aggie Art Gallery," containing a reddish maroon clay and dozens of handmade sculptures, all formed and left behind by cavers.

== History ==
Airman's Cave was discovered in 1971 by two airmen from nearby Bergstrom Air Force Base, who excavated a draughting crack under a crag. It was explored and surveyed over the next three years by members of the University of Texas Grotto of the National Speleological Society, who had to dig their way through several blockages.

The cave was the subject of a major rescue effort in October 2007 when three students became lost inside. They emerged unharmed after being underground for 30 hours.

In 2012, a security gate was installed in response to a sharp increase in traffic, which was considered to pose a serious safety risk to untrained individuals exploring the cave, as well as a threat to the cave and its fauna.
