= Seracamaurops =

Scientific classification
- Kingdom: Animalia
- Phylum: Arthropoda
- Clade: Pancrustacea
- Class: Insecta
- Order: Coleoptera
- Suborder: Polyphaga
- Infraorder: Staphyliniformia
- Family: Staphylinidae
- Subfamily: Pselaphinae
- Supertribe: Batrisitae
- Tribe: Amauropini
- Genus: Seracamaurops; A.Winkler, 1925

Genus of beetles

Seracamaurops is a genus of beetles belonging to the family Staphylinidae that is found in Western Balkans and Caucasia.

== Systematics ==
Seracamaurops currently consists of 17 species:

- Seracamaurops cadmei Pavićević & Ozimec, 2013 (Croatia)
- Seracamaurops cvorovici Hlaváč, Brachat & Delić, 2025 (Montenegro)
- Seracamaurops delici Lohaj, Pavićević & Lakota, 2023 (Montenegro)
- Seracamaurops fodori (Székessy, 1943) (Montenegro)
- Seracamaurops frieseni (Winkler, 1925) (Bosnia & Hercegovina)
- Seracamaurops fritschi Besuchet, 1986 (Montenegro)
- Seracamaurops grabowskii (Müller, 1926) (Bosnia & Hercegovina)
- Seracamaurops grandis (Winkler, 1925) (Bosnia & Hercegovina)
- Seracamaurops rumijaensis Lohaj, Pavićević & Lakota, 2023 (Montenegro)
- Seracamaurops komarovi Hlaváč, Kodada & Koval, 1999 (Caucasus)
- Seracamaurops mlejneki Pavićević, Hlaváč & Lakota, 2008 (Bosnia & Hercegovina)
- Seracamaurops nonveilleri Pavićević, Hlaváč & Lakota, 2008 (Bosnia & Hercegovina)
- Seracamaurops novaki Svircev, 1936 (Bosnia & Hercegovina)
- Seracamaurops ognjenovici Pavićević, Hlaváč & Lakota, 2008 (Montenegro)
- Seracamaurops perovici Pavićević, Njunjić & Plećaš, 2014 (Montenegro)
- Seracamaurops perreaui Nonveiller & Pavićević, 2008 (Montenegro)
- Seracamaurops popovici Pavićević, Hlaváč & Lakota, 2008 (Bosnia & Hercegovina)
- Seracamaurops weiratheri (Reitter, 1913) (Bosnia & Hercegovina)
