= Rhadine ozarkensis =

Scientific classification
- Kingdom: Animalia
- Phylum: Arthropoda
- Class: Insecta
- Order: Coleoptera
- Suborder: Adephaga
- Family: Carabidae
- Genus: Rhadine
- Species: R. ozarkensis

Binomial name
- Rhadine ozarkensis Sanderson & Miller, 1941

Species of beetle

Rhadine ozarkensis is a species of ground beetle in the family Carabidae. It is found in North America.

== Discovery ==
In the 1940s, a new species of ground beetle belonging to the genus Rhadine, was discovered by Milton W. Sanderson from the University of Arkansas and Fayetteville and Albert Miller, Tulane University. This is the second species of the genus to be recorded from caves, the first having been described from Carlsbad Cavern in New Mexico by Benedict (1927). It has an elongated body, elongated head which is widest across the eyes, three-fourths as wide as pronotum, and two or three shallow longitudinal grooves nearly parallel to the antennal ridge.
