= Adriaphaenops =

Scientific classification
- Kingdom: Animalia
- Phylum: Arthropoda
- Clade: Pancrustacea
- Class: Insecta
- Order: Coleoptera
- Suborder: Adephaga
- Family: Carabidae
- Subfamily: Trechinae
- Tribe: Trechini
- Genus: Adriaphaenops; Noesske, 1928

Genus of beetles

Adriaphaenops is a genus in the beetle family Carabidae, first described by Kurt Hermann Gustav Otto Noesske in 1928. There are about 12 described species in Adriaphaenops, found in the Balkans.

== Species ==
These 12 species belong to the genus Adriaphaenops:

- Adriaphaenops albanicus Lohaj et al, 2016 (Albania)
- Adriaphaenops antroherponomimus (Noesske, 1928) (Bosnia-Herzegovina)
- Adriaphaenops jasminkoi Lohaj et al, 2016 (Bosnia-Herzegovina)
- Adriaphaenops kevser Queinnec; Pavicevic & Ollivier, 2008 (Bosnia-Herzegovina)
- Adriaphaenops mlejneki Lohaj et al, 2016 (Montenegro)
- Adriaphaenops njegosiensis Lohaj et al, 2016 (Montenegro)
- Adriaphaenops petrimaris Lokaj & Delic, 2019 (Montenegro)
- Adriaphaenops pretneri Scheibel, 1935 (Bosnia-Herzegovina)
- Adriaphaenops rumijaensis Lohaj et al, 2016 (Montenegro)
- Adriaphaenops staudacheri Scheibel, 1939 (former Yugoslavia)
- Adriaphaenops stirni (Pretner, 1959) (former Yugoslavia)
- Adriaphaenops zupcensis (Pavicevic, 1990) (former Yugoslavia)
