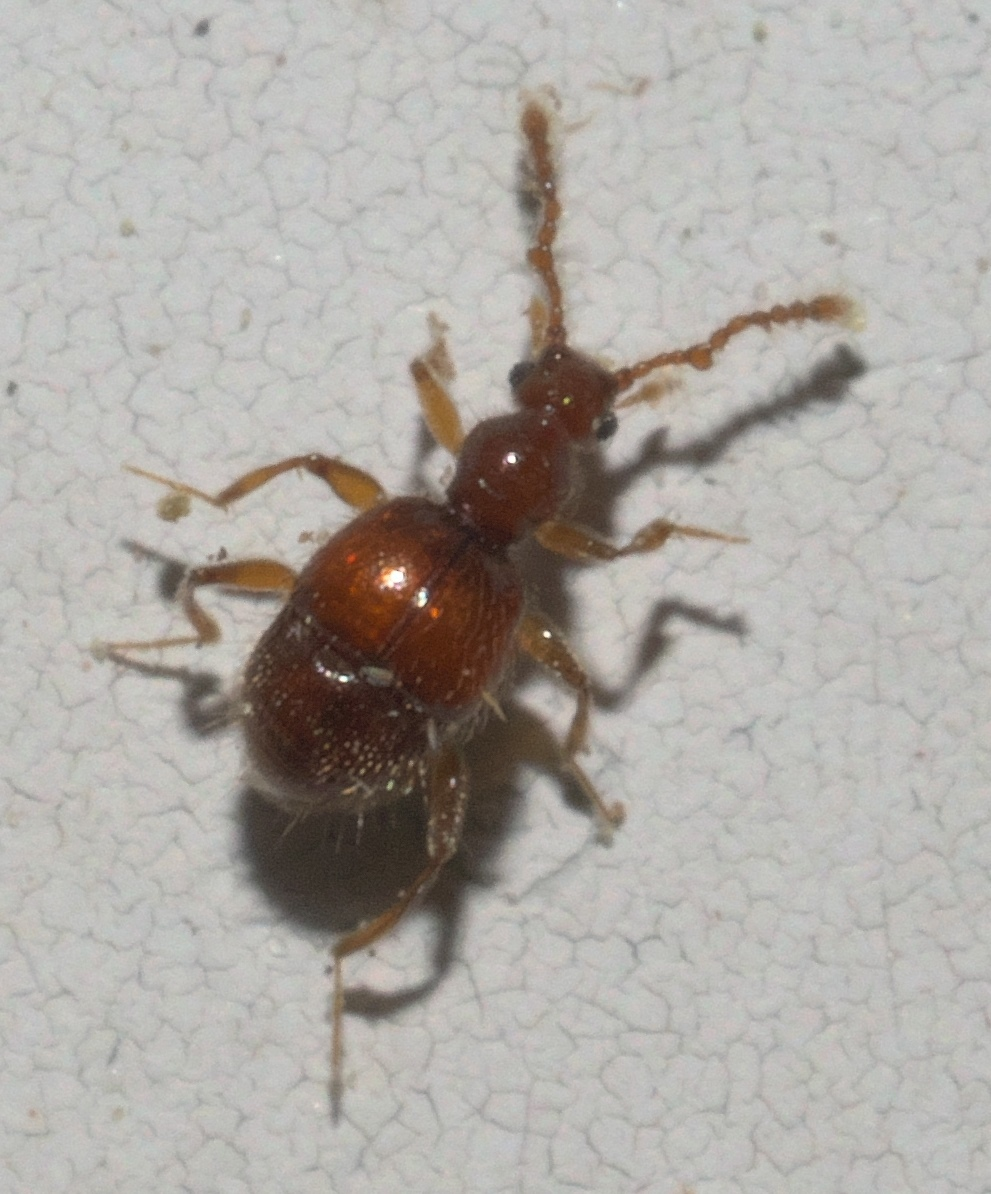
- Arthmius bulbifer, Oklahoma

Scientific classification
- Kingdom: Animalia
- Phylum: Arthropoda
- Class: Insecta
- Order: Coleoptera
- Suborder: Polyphaga
- Infraorder: Staphyliniformia
- Family: Staphylinidae
- Genus: Arthmius
- Species: A. bulbifer

Binomial name
- Arthmius bulbifer Casey, 1894

= Arthmius bulbifer =

Species of beetle

Arthmius bulbifer is a species of ant-loving beetle in the family Staphylinidae. It is found in North America.
