= Batrisodes ionae =

Scientific classification
- Kingdom: Animalia
- Phylum: Arthropoda
- Class: Insecta
- Order: Coleoptera
- Suborder: Polyphaga
- Infraorder: Staphyliniformia
- Family: Staphylinidae
- Genus: Batrisodes
- Species: B. ionae

Binomial name
- Batrisodes ionae (LeConte, 1849)

Synonyms
- Batrisodes caseyi Blatchley, 1910

Species of beetle

Batrisodes ionae is a species of ant-loving beetle in the family Staphylinidae. It is found in North America.
