= Rhadine jejuna =

Scientific classification
- Kingdom: Animalia
- Phylum: Arthropoda
- Class: Insecta
- Order: Coleoptera
- Suborder: Adephaga
- Family: Carabidae
- Genus: Rhadine
- Species: R. jejuna

Binomial name
- Rhadine jejuna (LeConte, 1878)

Synonyms
- Platynus gracilentus (Casey, 1913); Platynus jejunus LeConte, 1878; Platynus plumasensis (Casey, 1920); Platynus pugetanus (Casey, 1920); Platynus tenuipes (Casey, 1920); Rhadine gracilenta Casey, 1913; Rhadine plumasensis Casey, 1920; Rhadine pugetana Casey, 1920; Rhadine tenuipes Casey, 1920

Species of beetle

Rhadine jejuna is a species of ground beetle in the family Carabidae. It is found in North America.
