= Rhadine babcocki =

Scientific classification
- Domain: Eukaryota
- Kingdom: Animalia
- Phylum: Arthropoda
- Class: Insecta
- Order: Coleoptera
- Suborder: Adephaga
- Family: Carabidae
- Genus: Rhadine
- Species: R. babcocki

Binomial name
- Rhadine babcocki (Barr, 1960)

Species of beetle

Rhadine babcocki is a species of ground beetle in the family Carabidae.
