= Pseudamaurops calcaratus =

Scientific classification
- Kingdom: Animalia
- Phylum: Arthropoda
- Class: Insecta
- Order: Coleoptera
- Suborder: Polyphaga
- Infraorder: Staphyliniformia
- Family: Staphylinidae
- Genus: Pseudamaurops
- Species: P. calcaratus

Binomial name
- Pseudamaurops calcaratus (Nonveiller & Pavićević, 2002)
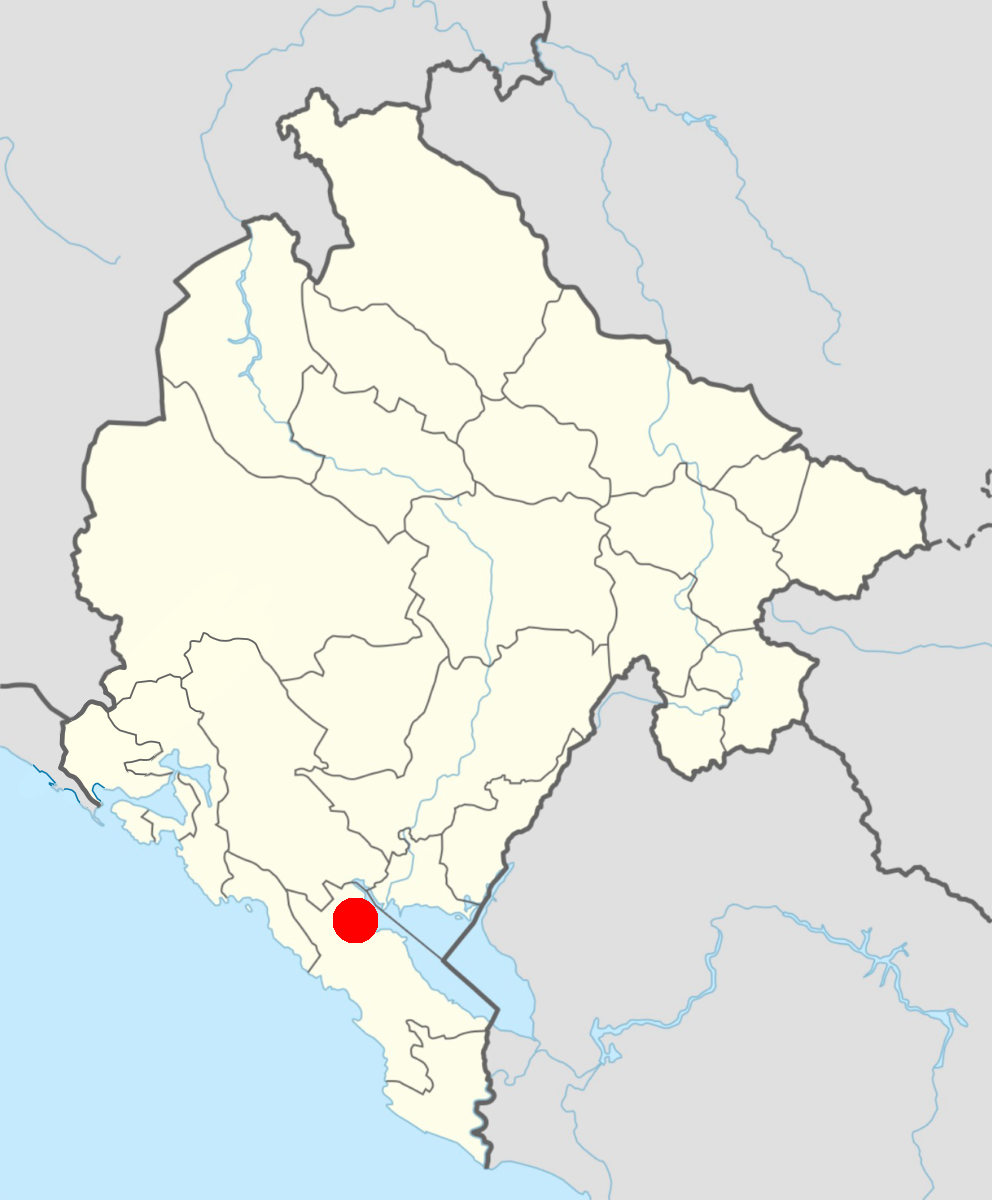

Species of beetle

Pseudamaurops calcaratus is a species of beetle in the family Staphylinidae. It is found in Montenegro.

== Distribution ==
This species is endemic to Montenegro. It is known from the vicinity of Virpazar and Gornja Seoca.
