= Arthmius globicollis =

Scientific classification
- Kingdom: Animalia
- Phylum: Arthropoda
- Class: Insecta
- Order: Coleoptera
- Suborder: Polyphaga
- Infraorder: Staphyliniformia
- Family: Staphylinidae
- Genus: Arthmius
- Species: A. globicollis

Binomial name
- Arthmius globicollis LeConte, 1849

Species of beetle

Arthmius globicollis is a species of ant-loving beetle in the family Staphylinidae. It is found in North America.
