= Amauropini =

Scientific classification
- Kingdom: Animalia
- Phylum: Arthropoda
- Class: Insecta
- Order: Coleoptera
- Suborder: Polyphaga
- Infraorder: Staphyliniformia
- Family: Staphylinidae
- Subfamily: Pselaphinae
- Supertribe: Batrisitae
- Tribe: Amauropini

Tribe of rove beetles

Amauropini is a tribe of small rove beetles in the subfamily Pselaphinae (Staphylinidae).

== Description ==
Small rove beetles (length less than 5 mm). They are eyeless, and the area normally occupied by the eyes protrudes as a sharp spine. The elytra are shortened, and the tarsi are three-segmented (tarsal formula 3-3-3). All members inhabit deep leaf litter, areas under stones, or are troglobionts. Some American species of Arianops live in association with ants of the genus Amblyopone.

They have normal antennae (without modifications), a slender claw on the second tarsal segment, and the penultimate segment of the hind tarsi is similar in length to the preceding segment (in Batrisini, it is the opposite: a thick claw on the second tarsal segment, and the penultimate segment of the hind tarsi is similar in length to the following segment).

== Systematics ==
About 150 species, 12 extant genera. The tribe was first established in 1948. The tribe Amauropini is included in the supertribe Batrisitae.

  - Amaurops Fairmaire, 1851 — 4 species, Western Palaearctic
  - Amauropus Reitter, 1918 — 1 species, Western Palaearctic
  - Arianops Brendel, 1893 — 40 species, North America
  - Bergrothia Reitter, 1884 — 7 species, Caucasus
  - Orientamaurops Karaman, 1961 — 1 species, Lebanon
  - Paramaurops Jeannel, 1948 — 55 species, Europe
  - Protamaurops G. Müller, 1944 — 9 species, Balkans
  - Pseudamaurops Jeannel, 1948 — 8 species, Balkans
  - Seracamaurops Winkler, 1925 — 15 species, Balkans
  - Troglamaurops Ganglbauer, 1903 — 3 species, Balkans
  - Tropidamaurops Jeannel, 1948 — 1 species, Italy
  - Zoufalia Reitter, 1918 — 5 species, Balkans

== Distribution ==
Holarctic: North America, Europe. One genus is endemic to eastern North America, while the remaining 11 are restricted to the western Palaearctic.
