= Rhadine (beetle) =

- Rhadine lindrothi

Scientific classification
- Domain: Eukaryota
- Kingdom: Animalia
- Phylum: Arthropoda
- Class: Insecta
- Order: Coleoptera
- Suborder: Adephaga
- Family: Carabidae
- Tribe: Platynini
- Genus: Rhadine; LeConte, 1846

Genus of beetles

Rhadine lindrothi Barr beetle

Rhadine is a genus of beetles in the family Carabidae, containing the following species:

== Species ==
These 53 species belong to the genus Rhadine:

- Rhadine albamontana Dajoz, 1998
- Rhadine anthicoides Casey, 1913
- Rhadine araizai (Bolivar y Pieltain, 1944)
- Rhadine austinica Barr, 1974
- Rhadine babcocki (Barr, 1960)
- Rhadine balesi (B.Gray, 1937)
- Rhadine bolivari Barr, 1982
- Rhadine bullis Reddell & Cokendolpher, 2004
- Rhadine caudata (LeConte, 1863)
- Rhadine chipinque Barr, 1982
- Rhadine constricta Casey, 1913
- Rhadine dissecta (LeConte, 1863)
- Rhadine elliotti Barr, 1982
- Rhadine euprepes (Bates, 1882)
- Rhadine exilis (Barr & Lawrence, 1960)
- Rhadine grubbsi Reddell & Dupérré, 2009
- Rhadine hendrichsi Barr, 1982
- Rhadine howdeni (Barr & Lawrence, 1960)
- Rhadine infernalis (Barr & Lawrence, 1960)
- Rhadine insolita Barr, 1974
- Rhadine ivyi Reddell & Cokendolpher, 2004
- Rhadine jejuna (LeConte, 1878)
- Rhadine koepkei (Barr, 1960)
- Rhadine lanei (B.Gray, 1937)
- Rhadine larvalis LeConte, 1846
- Rhadine leptodes (Bates, 1882)
- Rhadine lindrothi Barr, 1965
- Rhadine longiceps Van Dyke, 1949
- Rhadine longicollis Benedict, 1927
- Rhadine longipes Casey, 1913
- Rhadine medellini Bolivar y Pieltain & Hendrichs, 1964
- Rhadine myrmecodes (G.Horn, 1892)
- Rhadine nivalis (G.Horn, 1881)
- Rhadine noctivaga Barr, 1974
- Rhadine ozarkensis Sanderson & A.Miller, 1941
- Rhadine pelaezi Bolivar y Pieltain & Hendrichs, 1964
- Rhadine perlevis Casey, 1913
- Rhadine persephone Barr, 1974
- Rhadine pertenuis Casey, 1920
- Rhadine pugetana Casey, 1920
- Rhadine reddelli Barr, 1982
- Rhadine reyesi Reddell & Cokendolpher, 2001
- Rhadine rossi Van Dyke, 1949
- Rhadine rotgeri Bolivar y Pieltain & Hendrichs, 1964
- Rhadine rubra (Barr, 1960)
- Rhadine russelli Barr, 1974
- Rhadine specum (Barr, 1960)
- Rhadine sprousei Reddell & Cokendolpher, 2004
- Rhadine sublustris Casey, 1913
- Rhadine subterranea (Van Dyke, 1919)
- Rhadine tenebrosa (Barr, 1960)
- Rhadine testacea Casey, 1920
- Rhadine umbra Casey, 1913

== Habitat and ecology ==
The genus Rhadine as a whole is very widespread. They live in moist and cool environments. An indicator of evolutionary history, it is typically found in southwestern Texas. Several species are only found in mountaintops while others are restricted to deep caves or more general subterranean habitats. However, no food habits are known in any species of the genus Rhadine but the family of carabids are typically predaceous. Carabid beetle species diversity, community composition, and wing-state act as ecological indicators of forest age. The genus therefore, is an appealing group for studying regressive evolution (the reduction or total loss of traits over time) and biogeography.
