= Rhadine balesi =

Scientific classification
- Domain: Eukaryota
- Kingdom: Animalia
- Phylum: Arthropoda
- Class: Insecta
- Order: Coleoptera
- Suborder: Adephaga
- Family: Carabidae
- Genus: Rhadine
- Species: R. balesi

Binomial name
- Rhadine balesi (Gray, 1937)

Synonyms
- Agonum balesi Gray, 1937

Species of beetle

Rhadine balesi is a species of ground beetle in the subfamily Platyninae that can be found in Oregon, Washington, and Idaho.
