= Rhadine lindrothi =

Scientific classification
- Kingdom: Animalia
- Phylum: Arthropoda
- Clade: Pancrustacea
- Class: Insecta
- Order: Coleoptera
- Suborder: Adephaga
- Family: Carabidae
- Genus: Rhadine
- Species: R. lindrothi

Binomial name
- Rhadine lindrothi Barr, 1965

Species of beetle

Rhadine lindrothi is a species of ground beetle in the family Carabidae. It is found in North America.
