= Adriaphaenops mlejneki =

Scientific classification
- Kingdom: Animalia
- Phylum: Arthropoda
- Clade: Pancrustacea
- Class: Insecta
- Order: Coleoptera
- Suborder: Adephaga
- Family: Carabidae
- Genus: Adriaphaenops
- Species: A. mlejneki

Binomial name
- Adriaphaenops mlejneki Lohaj, Roman, Lakota, Ján, Quéinnec, Eric, Pavićević, Dragan & Čeplík, Dávid, 2016
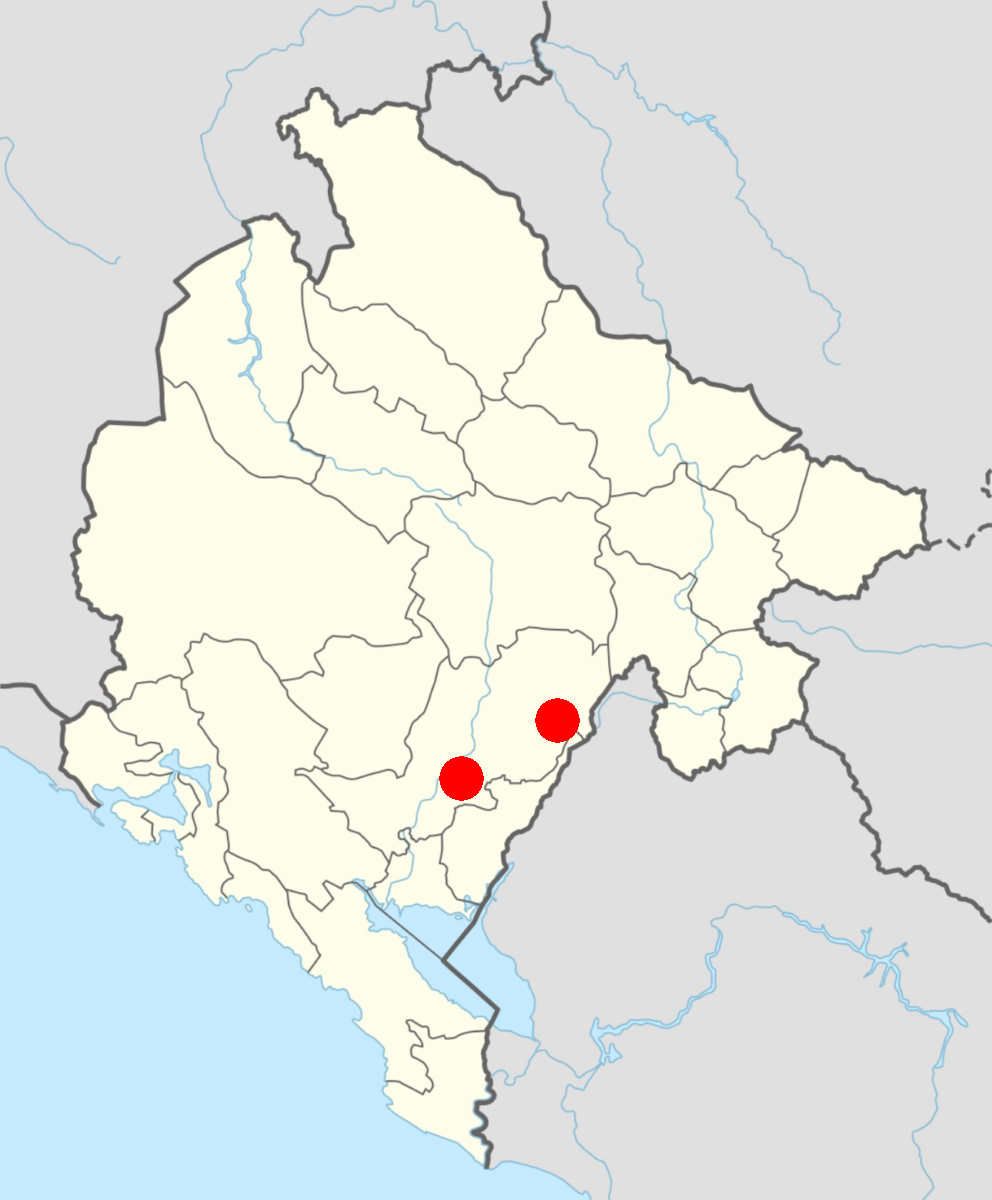
- Adriaphaenops mlejneki records map

Species of beetle

Adriaphaenops mlejneki is a species of a ground beetle in the family Carabidae. It is found in Montenegro.

== Distribution ==
This species is endemic to Montenegro, where it is known only from the Podgorica Municipality. All records are from the area of Mount Žijovo and the nearby locality of Medan.
