= Adriaphaenops petrimaris =

Scientific classification
- Kingdom: Animalia
- Phylum: Arthropoda
- Class: Insecta
- Order: Coleoptera
- Suborder: Adephaga
- Family: Carabidae
- Genus: Adriaphaenops
- Species: A. petrimaris

Binomial name
- Adriaphaenops petrimaris Lokaj & Delic, 2019
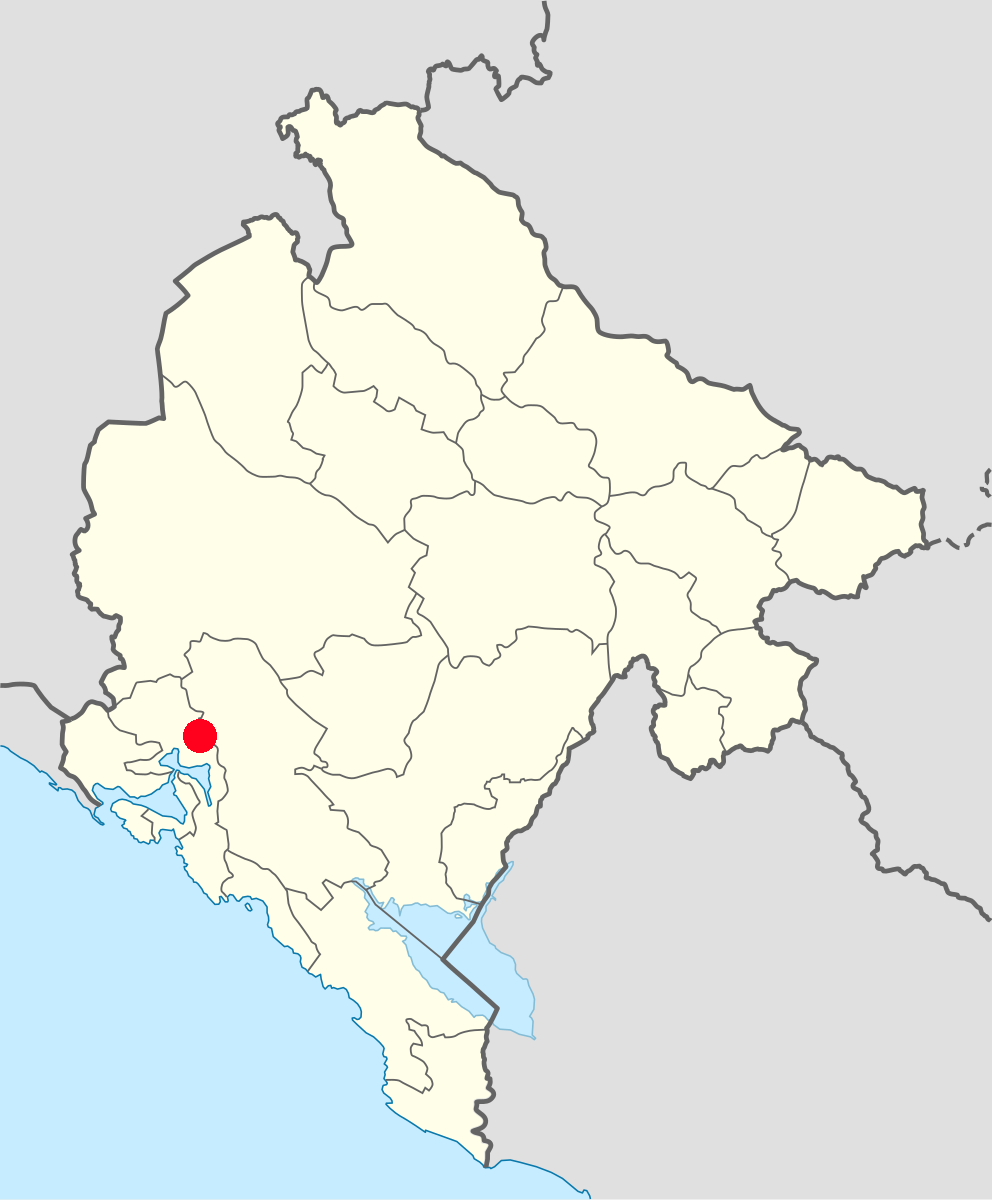
- Adriaphaenops petrimaris holotype map

Species of beetle

Adriaphaenops petrimaris is a species of a ground beetle in the family Carabidae. It is found in Montenegro.

== Distribution ==
This species is endemic to Montenegro. The holotype was collected in the Pištet cave, located at Velji Pištet near Risan.
