= Tribasodites bama =

Scientific classification
- Kingdom: Animalia
- Phylum: Arthropoda
- Class: Insecta
- Order: Coleoptera
- Suborder: Polyphaga
- Infraorder: Staphyliniformia
- Family: Staphylinidae
- Genus: Tribasodites
- Species: T. bama

Binomial name
- Tribasodites bama Yin, Nomura & Li, 2015

Species of beetle

Tribasodites bama is a species of beetle first found in Guangxi, China.
