= Arthmius involutus =

Scientific classification
- Kingdom: Animalia
- Phylum: Arthropoda
- Class: Insecta
- Order: Coleoptera
- Suborder: Polyphaga
- Infraorder: Staphyliniformia
- Family: Staphylinidae
- Genus: Arthmius
- Species: A. involutus

Binomial name
- Arthmius involutus Casey, 1894

Species of beetle

Arthmius involutus is a species of ant-loving beetle in the family Staphylinidae. It is found in North America.
