= Thaumastocephalini =

Scientific classification
- Kingdom: Animalia
- Phylum: Arthropoda
- Clade: Pancrustacea
- Class: Insecta
- Order: Coleoptera
- Suborder: Polyphaga
- Infraorder: Staphyliniformia
- Family: Staphylinidae
- Subfamily: Pselaphinae
- Supertribe: Batrisitae
- Tribe: Thaumastocephalini; Poggi et al., 2001

Tribe of beetles

Thaumastocephalini is a tribe of rove beetles in the supertribe Batrisitae. It was first described by Poggi, Nonveiller, Colla, Pavićević, and Rada in 2001. It contains 2 genera and 9 species.

== Genera and species ==
- Percussiopalpus
  - Percussiopalpus inusitatus
- Thaumastocephalus
  - Thaumastocephalus bilandzijae
  - Thaumastocephalus dahnae
  - Thaumastocephalus folliculipalpus
  - Thaumastocephalus kirini
  - Thaumastocephalus marsici
  - Thaumastocephalus rujnicensis
  - Thaumastocephalus slavkoi
  - Thaumastocephalus troglavi
