= Rhadine myrmecodes =

Scientific classification
- Domain: Eukaryota
- Kingdom: Animalia
- Phylum: Arthropoda
- Class: Insecta
- Order: Coleoptera
- Suborder: Adephaga
- Family: Carabidae
- Genus: Rhadine
- Species: R. myrmecodes

Binomial name
- Rhadine myrmecodes (G. Horn, 1892)

Synonyms
- Platynus myrmecodes G. Horn, 1892

Species of beetle

Rhadine myrmecodes is a species of ground beetle in the family Carabidae. It is found in North America.
