= Rhadine caudata =

Conservation status
- Vulnerable (NatureServe)

Scientific classification
- Domain: Eukaryota
- Kingdom: Animalia
- Phylum: Arthropoda
- Class: Insecta
- Order: Coleoptera
- Suborder: Adephaga
- Family: Carabidae
- Genus: Rhadine
- Species: R. caudata

Binomial name
- Rhadine caudata (LeConte, 1863)

Synonyms
- Platynus caudatus LeConte, 1863

Species of North American ground beetle

Rhadine caudata is a species of beetle native to the eastern United States. It is a brachypterous (incapable of flight) habitat specialist, occurring in only two of five forest classes in a North Carolina study. R. caudata is a considered a Vulnerable species at the global level on NatureServe, Imperiled in Alabama, and Vulnerable in Virginia.

R. caudata occurs in both surface and subsurface environments, studying it and other species in the genus Rhadine may reveal more about the evolution of subterranean life, regressive evolution, and biodiversity indicators.

It was first formally named by John Lawrence LeConte in 1863 as Platynus caudatus and later transferred to the genus Rhadine.

== Distribution ==
The majority of the 60 species in the genus Rhadine are subterranean, with almost all of the species found in the southwestern United States. In contrast, R. caudata has been found from Texas to the east coast, north to Wisconsin. It is widely distributed, but rare, with a low dispersal rate. It is known to be abundant only at the Cumberland Caverns and McElroy Cave in Tennessee. It has been found in Alabama, Arkansas, District of Columbia, Georgia, Illinois, Indiana, Kentucky, Maryland, North Carolina, Ohio, Pennsylvania, Tennessee, Virginia, Wisconsin, and West Virginia.
