= Rhadine howdeni =

Scientific classification
- Domain: Eukaryota
- Kingdom: Animalia
- Phylum: Arthropoda
- Class: Insecta
- Order: Coleoptera
- Suborder: Adephaga
- Family: Carabidae
- Genus: Rhadine
- Species: R. howdeni

Binomial name
- Rhadine howdeni (Barr & Lawrence, 1960)

Species of beetle

Rhadine howdeni is a species of ground beetles in the family Carabidae. It is found in North America.
