= Rhadine dissecta =

Scientific classification
- Domain: Eukaryota
- Kingdom: Animalia
- Phylum: Arthropoda
- Class: Insecta
- Order: Coleoptera
- Suborder: Adephaga
- Family: Carabidae
- Genus: Rhadine
- Species: R. dissecta

Binomial name
- Rhadine dissecta (LeConte, 1863)

Synonyms
- Platynus dissectus LeConte, 1863

Species of beetle

Rhadine dissecta is a species of ground beetle in the family Carabidae. It is found in North America.
