= Seracamaurops delici =

Scientific classification
- Kingdom: Animalia
- Phylum: Arthropoda
- Clade: Pancrustacea
- Class: Insecta
- Order: Coleoptera
- Suborder: Polyphaga
- Infraorder: Staphyliniformia
- Family: Staphylinidae
- Genus: Seracamaurops
- Species: S. delici

Binomial name
- Seracamaurops delici (Lohaj, Pavićević & Lakota, 2023)
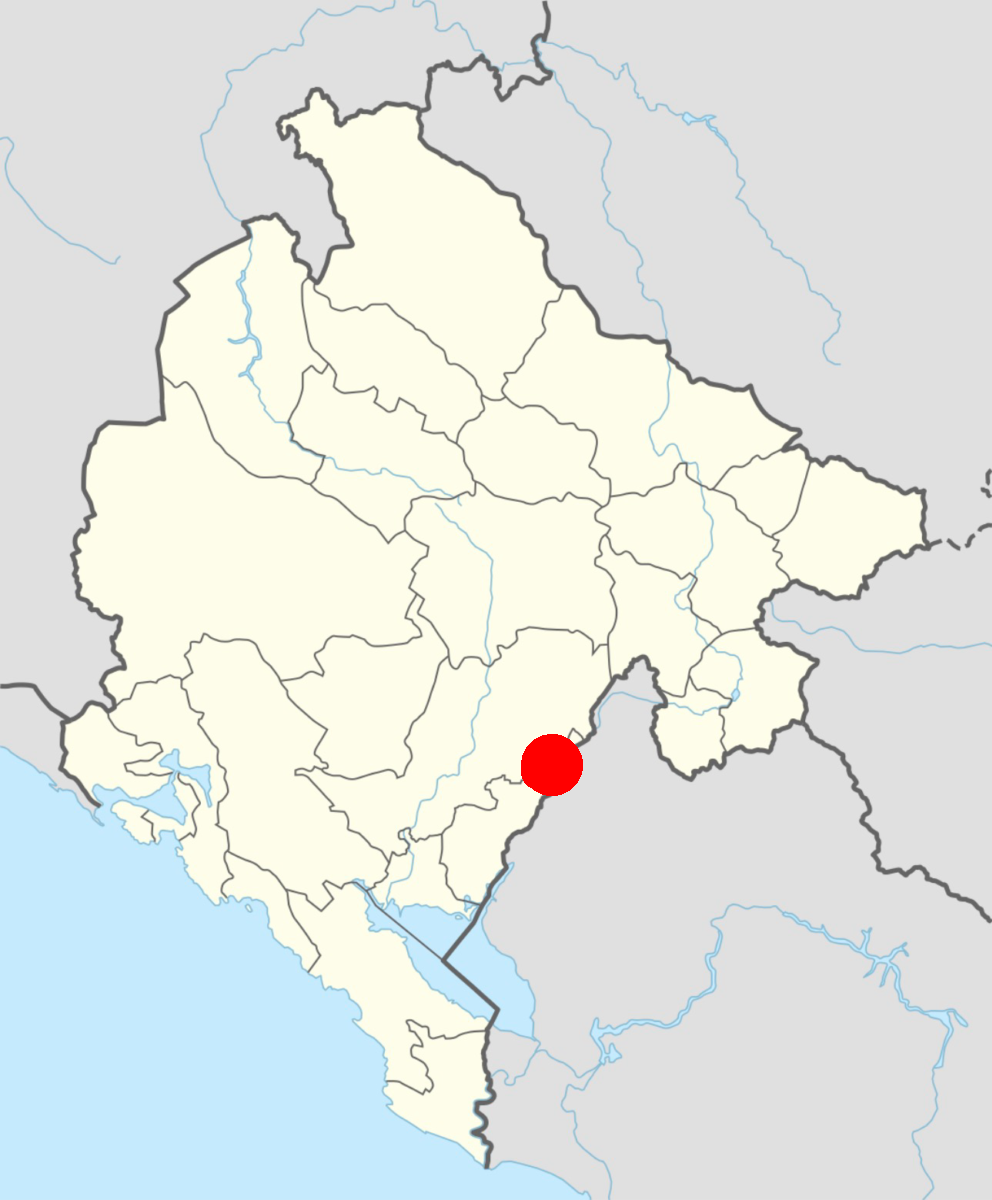

Species of beetle

Seracamaurops delici is a species of rove beetle in the family Staphylinidae. It lives in subterranean Dinaric karst habitats

== Distribution ==
This species is endemic to Montenegro. It is known only from two pits, Opasna jama and C-95, located on the Kučke planine mountain range, southeast of Podgorica. It shares its habitat with other subterranean beetles, including Neotrechus suturalis and Anthroherpon taxi.
