= Coffin Cave mold beetle =

Conservation status
- Critically Imperiled (NatureServe)

- Endangered (ESA)

Scientific classification
- Kingdom: Animalia
- Phylum: Arthropoda
- Clade: Pancrustacea
- Class: Insecta
- Order: Coleoptera
- Suborder: Polyphaga
- Infraorder: Staphyliniformia
- Family: Staphylinidae
- Genus: Batrisodes
- Species: B. texanus

Binomial name
- Batrisodes texanus Chandler, 1992

Species of beetle

The Coffin Cave mold beetle (Batrisodes texanus), also known as the Inner Space Caverns mold beetle, is a small insect that is only found in caves. They are very small at 2.60–2.88 mm (0.102–0.113 in) and lack any form of eyes. They are found exclusively in caves in a single county in Texas, Williamson County. The United States Fish and Wildlife Service considers the Coffin Cave mold beetle to be an endangered species. Threats facing this species include urbanization.

== Taxonomy ==
The Coffin Cave mold beetle was described as a new species in 1992 by Donald S. Chandler, who gave it the scientific name Batrisodes texanus and placed it in the subgenus Excavodes. Excavodes also contains Batrisodes cryptotexanus and Batrisodes reyesi, and is thought to be monophyletic (containing all descendants of a common ancestor) as of 2019. The holotype had been collected in 1965 in Inner Space Cavern. Its species name "texanus" was chosen to allude to its range, which is restricted to the US state of Texas.

In 2001, Chandler and Reddell split the Coffin Cave mold beetle into two species, additionally describing the Dragonfly Cave mold beetle, B. cryptotexanus. It was determined that B. cryptotexanus is actually found in Coffin Cave, not B. texanus, causing some to refer to it as the Inner Space Caverns mold beetle instead of the Coffin Cave mold beetle. The United States Fish and Wildlife Service still refers to it as the Coffin Cave mold beetle as of 2018.

== Description ==
Individuals are 2.60–2.88 mm (0.102–0.113 in) long. They are sexually dimorphic, with males and not females possessing a slight groove across their heads before the base of the antennae. The pronotum (first segment of the thorax) has a longitudinal groove. The elytra (sheaths that cover the wings) have three pits at the bases. It lacks any form of eyes.

== Range and habitat ==
The Coffin Cave mold beetle is found only in Williamson County, Texas, where it is a cave-obligate species. It requires dark and humid conditions. The northernmost extent of its range is Cobbs Cavern, which is 8 km (5.0 mi) southeast of Florence, Texas. The southernmost extent of its range crosses the South Fork of the San Gabriel River, terminating at the Inner Space Caverns. If B. cryptotexanus is acknowledged as a separate species, then the Coffin Cave mold beetle occurs in the following caves and cave clusters: Godwin Ranch Preserve, Cobbs Cavern, Sunless City Cave, Waterfall Canyon Cave, On Campus Cave, Off Campus Cave, and Inner Space Cavern.

== Conservation ==
Even though the Coffin Cave mold beetle was not described until 1992, it has been considered listed under the United States Endangered Species Act of 1973 since 1988. Before it was recognized as a separate species, the Coffin Cave population of the beetle was thought to be the Kretschmarr Cave mold beetle (Texamaurops reddelli). Because the Kretschmarr Cave mold beetle had been recognized as federally endangered in 1988, a 1993 technical correction acknowledged that the Coffin Cave population represented another species, which was still to be recognized as federally endangered.

Threats that the species faces include habitat loss due to urbanization. The Williamson County human population has increased rapidly, with the number of single- and multi-family homes increasing 1,314% from 13,216 in 1970 to 186,964 in 2016.

== In popular culture ==
In a season 6 episode entitled “Suicide Squad” on the television show Brooklyn 99, Captain Raymond Holt refers twice to his nemesis Madeline Wunch as a “Coffin Cave mold beetle.”
