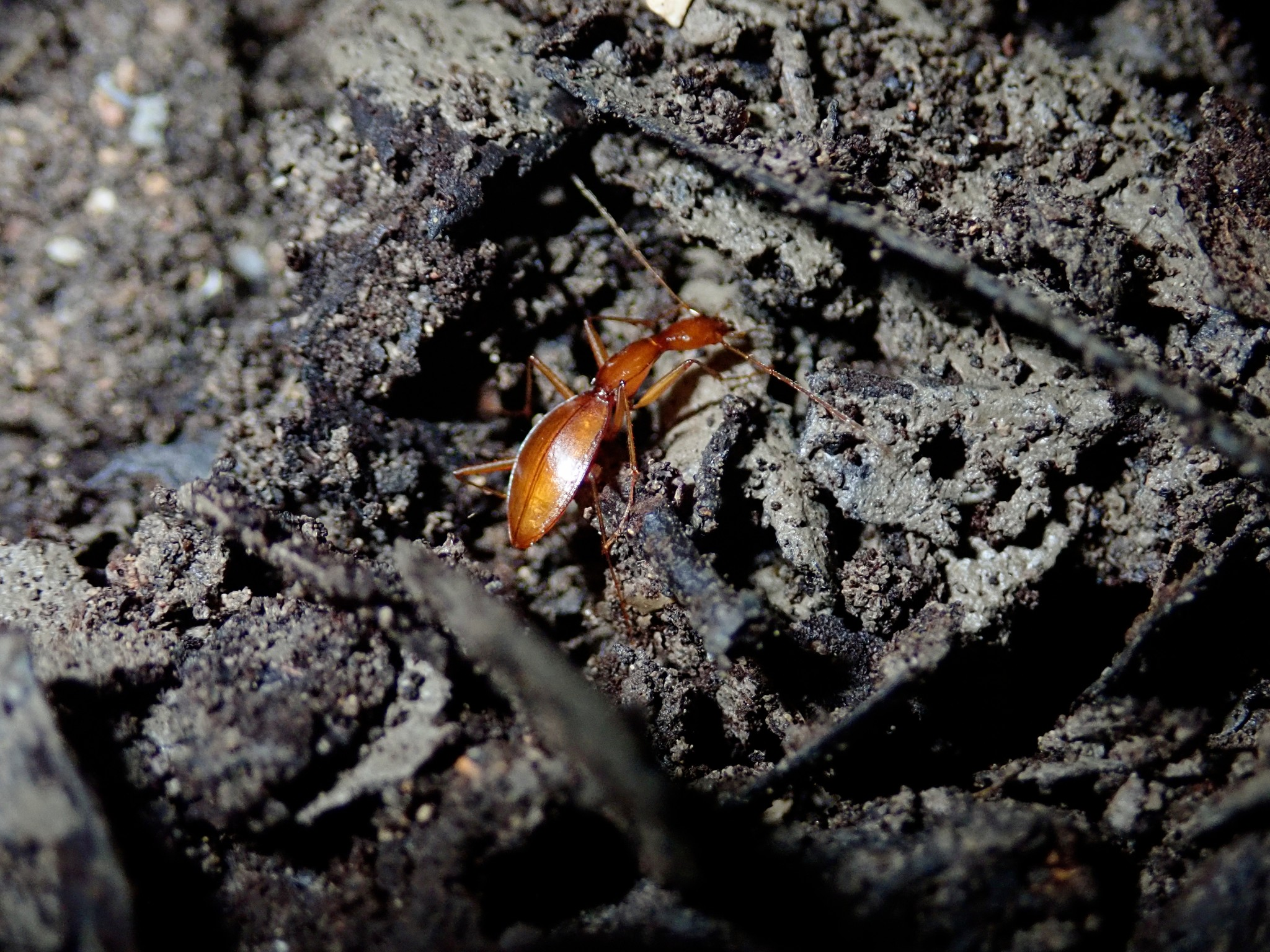

Conservation status
- Endangered (ESA)

Scientific classification
- Kingdom: Animalia
- Phylum: Arthropoda
- Clade: Pancrustacea
- Class: Insecta
- Order: Coleoptera
- Suborder: Adephaga
- Family: Carabidae
- Genus: Rhadine
- Species: R. infernalis

Binomial name
- Rhadine infernalis (Barr & Lawrence, 1960)

= Rhadine infernalis =

"Rhadine infernalis" No Common Name

Species of beetle

Rhadine infernalis is a species of troglobitic beetle of the family Carabidae. They are endemic to the county of Bexar, Texas. Within this county, R. infernalis has been found in 39 caves. There are 2 named subspecies of R. infernalis: R. infernalis infernalis and R. infernalis ewersi. There is a third possible subspecies that has not been officially described. R. infernalis was classified in 2000 as endangered under the IUCN Endangered Species Act of 1973, along with 8 other karst invertebrates in the same region. It has the widest known range of the endangered karst invertebrates.

== Subspecies ==
These two subspecies belong to the species Rhadine infernalis:

- Rhadine infernalis ewersi (Barr, 1960)
- Rhadine infernalis infernalis (Barr & Lawrence, 1960)

== Description ==
Similar to other cave-dwelling invertebrates, R. infernalis has reduced eyes and elongated appendages. It is reddish brown and has smooth elytra, with a narrow neck that is less than half the width of its head. It ranges in length from about 6.6 (0.26 in) to 8.2 mm (0.32 in). It may be distinguished from R. exilis, another karst-dwelling invertebrate that lives in Bexar County, by its thick rather than slender body. Its pronotum, a plate that covers the prothorax, is wider and less elongated compared to that of R. exilis. The pronotum also has two pairs of bristle-like structures called setae.

== Life history ==
Little is known about the life history of R. infernalis. It is likely to have evolved life characteristics similar to other cave-dwelling invertebrates, who have adapted to low levels of light and a lack of primary producers for food and nutrients. These types of conditions favor relatively long life spans and lower reproductive rates. This would be expected to be accompanied by a low metabolic rate as well.

== Ecology ==
=== Diet ===
Rhadine Infernalis inhabits caves and mesocaverns, which are small caves that are not accessible to humans. Due to their elusive nature, little is known about their behavior. The troglobite karst invertebrates probably depend on plant or animal matter that is washed into the caves, or on other invertebrates that live in the caves but feed on surface plants. It is thought that R. infernalis is an opportunistic feeder, eating smaller or dead arthropods that live in the caves. Cave crickets from the genus Ceuthophilus are abundant in Texas caves, and may be an important food source for R. infernalis. Karst invertebrates have been found to feed on these crickets, as well as on their nymphs and eggs.

=== Behavior ===
As R. infernalis likely occupies mesocaverns and cavities that cannot be studied without excavation, its behavior is not well understood.

In a study conducted by Veni and Associates (2006), R. infernalis was observed 23 times in 3 caves at Camp Bullis in Bexar County, Texas. It was mostly found under rocks, and was found nearer to cave entrances than R. exilis. Of the 23 observations, almost all were made during the spring and summer, while one sighting occurred in the fall. Due to the small sample size, no conclusions can be made about regular periods of dormancy or activity for R. infernalis. However, it is believed that troglobites such as R. infernalis can go long periods without food. When they do not need to feed, they retreat into very small spaces that cannot be surveyed by humans. This may explain the irregularity of R. infernalis sightings. Observations of R. infernalis suggest that it prefers areas of high organic content. R. infernalis has also been observed on old bat guano in Headquarters Cave.

=== Habitat ===
R. infernalis only occurs in the karst terrain specific to Bexar County, Texas. Karst habitats are formed from the dissolving of bedrock, resulting in sinkholes, caves, and mesocaverns. The karst habitat has stable temperatures and high humidity owing to the water that flows from the surface down through the cavities and interconnected voids in the limestone. The movement of water is an important way that nutrients flow through the underground system.

=== Range ===
The karst habitat in Bexar County has been divided into 6 karst fauna regions (KFRs), which are recognized by the U.S. Fish and Wildlife Service (USFWS). These were designated according to geographical barriers that occur within the karst habitat that would potentially prevent interaction between troglobite populations. For example, a KFR may be defined by faults or streams that would limit movement by troglobite invertebrates into other KFRs. R. infernalis has been found in 5 of the KFRs, in 39 caves.

== Conservation ==
=== Population size ===
The population estimates of R. infernalis are unavailable at this time because they inhabit inaccessible covered mesocaverns – making sampling and estimations difficult.

=== Past and current distributions ===
The historical range of R. infernalis before 1960 is unknown, but it is likely that it was similar to current geographical ranges.

=== Major threats ===
The karst ecosystem is dependent on the surface and subsurface drainage basins for nutrients and water flow. The ability of the karst habitat to move water and nutrients makes it vulnerable to unfavorable changes to the surface environment. Thus, R. infernalis is primarily threatened by habitat loss and development near the caves it occupies.

==== Urbanization ====
Urbanization and industrial developments can degrade the surrounding habitat through disturbance of topsoil, removal of native vegetation and animal populations, and pollution. In the year 2000, ten of the known locations inhabited by the nine endangered Bexar County invertebrates including R. infernalis had less than 10.1 hectares (24.96 acres) of undeveloped area remaining around the caves. It is estimated that about 26% of known caves in Bexar County alone had been destroyed by filling, capping, and covering with construction and developments. The destruction of cave entrances prevents water from entering the karst ecosystems where it is vital to maintaining the high humidity needed by karst invertebrates.

==== Change in biotic communities ====
The removal of native plant and animal communities in the areas surrounding caves is detrimental as they are the main source of nutrients for the karst ecosystem. Furthermore, they prevent erosion and act as protection against invasive species. The red imported fire ant (Solenopsis invicta) in particular has been identified as a threat to karst invertebrates due to predation. The presence of this species is associated with areas disturbed by development. Surrounding surface vegetation also acts as a buffer to temperature changes and helps to filter out contaminants in water that flows into the cave systems. Because water is able to infiltrate karst habitat at a high rate, groundwater pollutants are a major concern for karst invertebrates. Such contaminants include oil, agrochemicals, and sewage. The population in Bexar County is expected to increase to over 3 million people by 2050. This poses a considerable challenge for the conservation of R. infernalis.

==== Climate change ====
Climate change was not listed as a threat to R. infernalis when it was first named as an endangered species. However, with predicted increases in temperatures globally, it is now being considered as a potential threat to R. infernalis. More frequent droughts could disrupt normal water flow into the karst ecosystem, and higher temperatures could reduce humidity in the caves. Changes to the microclimate of these caves may prove detrimental to the R. infernalis population because karst invertebrates have evolved in conditions of constant humidity and temperatures.

=== Listing under the ESA ===
R. infernalis was petitioned to be federally listed under the Endangered Species Act on January 9, 1992. The species was listed as endangered on December 26, 2000 along with eight other Bexar-County invertebrates.

=== 5-Year Review ===
A 5-Year Review for R. infernalis was conducted in 2011 and 2021. At the time of the most recent review, several cave clusters and individual caves had been identified as potential high-quality Karst Fauna Areas (KFAs). KFAs are geographically distinct areas within a KFR that are known to contain at least one population of an endangered karst species. The standing recommendation is to have 3 or more high-quality KFAs per KFR for R. infernalis. Several preserves have been established by the City of San Antonio and the Texas Parks and Wildlife Department. These are being managed according to the Southern Edwards Plateau Habitat Conservation Plan Government Canyon State Natural Area Karst Fauna Areas Management and Monitoring Plan. The USFWS is in the process of trying to make these preserves into KFAs.

Since the 5-Year Review in 2011, a new species of invasive ant has been reported in Bexar County. The tawny crazy ant (Nylanderia fulva) may negatively impact arthropod biodiversity and native plant communities. The 2021 Review thus calls for more research as it is uncertain whether this species could affect R. infernalis populations. Additionally, the 2021 Review highlighted climate change as a growing threat to the karst ecosystem.

=== Species Status Assessment ===
None available at this time

=== Recovery plan ===
A recovery plan for Bexar County karst invertebrates was published in 2011. The recovery of endangered karst invertebrates focuses on establishing KFAs within the 6 KFRs. Recovery plans emphasize establishing a sufficient number of KFAs to encompass multiple known populations of R. infernalis in order to prevent extinction of the species in the case that one population fails. These KFAs are to be managed with the goal of reducing the threats to R. infernalis. This includes controlling invasive species populations and providing protection from development and pollutants.

The recovery plan calls for more research to better understand and monitor the karst invertebrates. It also asserts a need to educate the public about the karst habitat and the endangered karst species. The recovery plan estimated that delisting of R. infernalis could be achieved in 20 years after its enactment, but the species remains classified as endangered. No additional recovery plans have been drafted since 2011.
