= Adriaphaenops rumijaensis =

Scientific classification
- Kingdom: Animalia
- Phylum: Arthropoda
- Class: Insecta
- Order: Coleoptera
- Suborder: Adephaga
- Family: Carabidae
- Genus: Adriaphaenops
- Species: A. rumijaensis

Binomial name
- Adriaphaenops rumijaensis Lohaj, Lakota, Quénnec, Pavićević & Čeplik, 2016
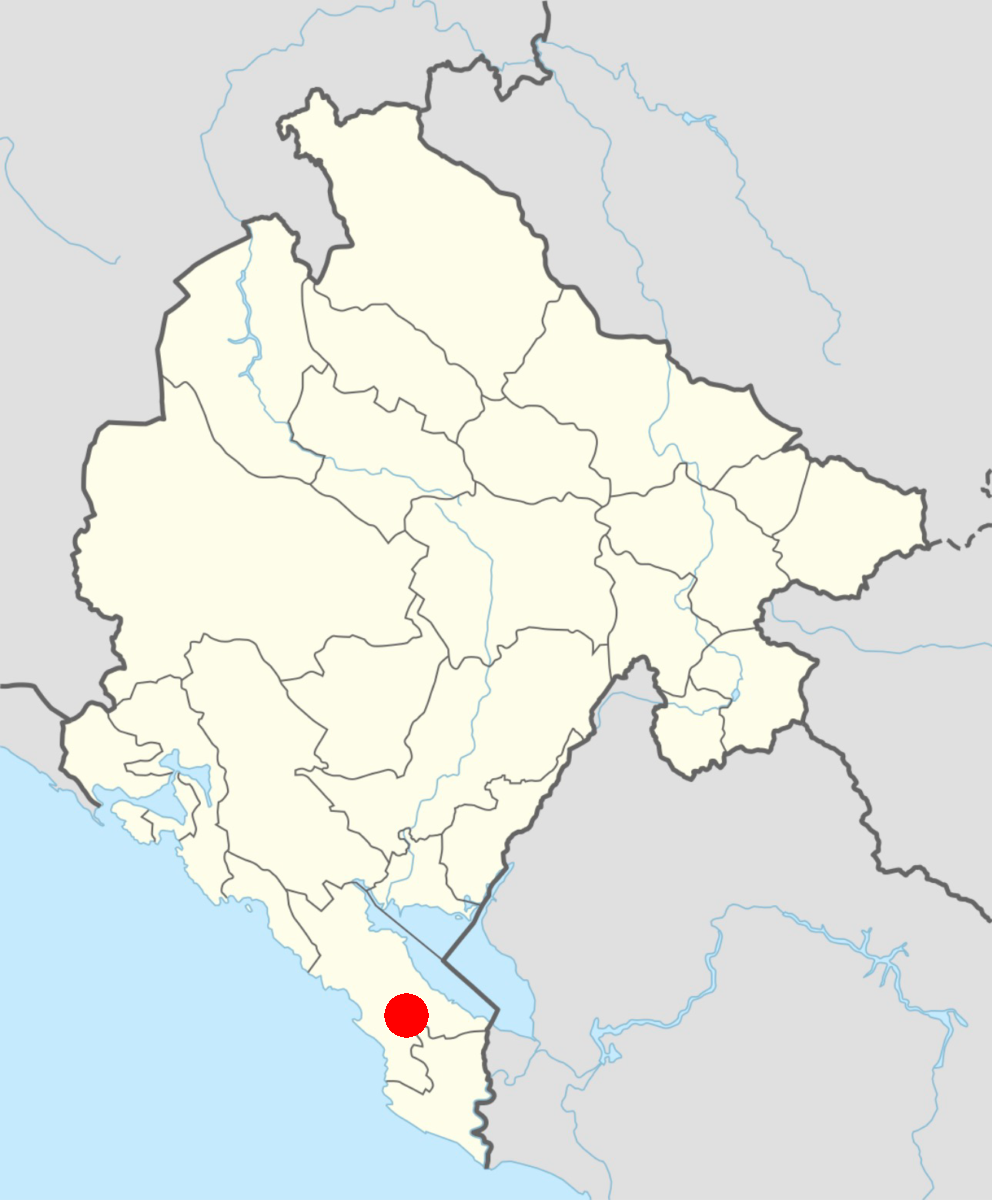
- Adriaphaenops rumijaensis holotype map

Species of beetle

Adriaphaenops rumijaensis is a species of a ground beetle in the family Carabidae. It is found in Montenegro.

== Distribution ==
This species is endemic to Montenegro, where it is known only from the Bar Municipality. Its sole recorded locality is Mount Rumija.
