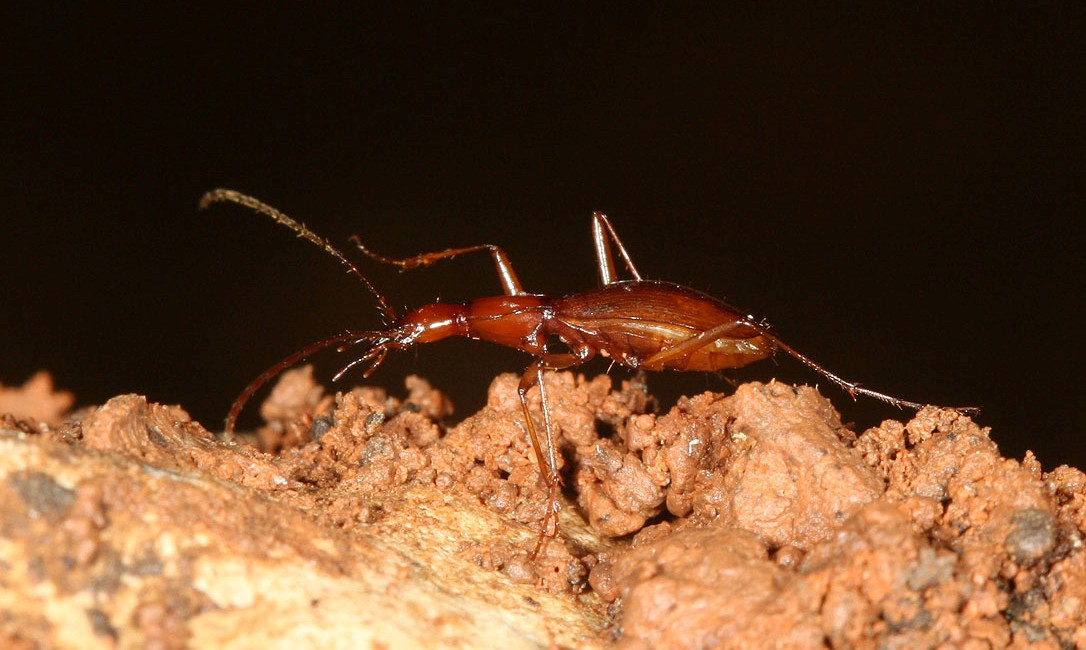

Conservation status
- Critically Imperiled (NatureServe)

- Endangered (ESA)

Scientific classification
- Kingdom: Animalia
- Phylum: Arthropoda
- Clade: Pancrustacea
- Class: Insecta
- Order: Coleoptera
- Suborder: Adephaga
- Family: Carabidae
- Genus: Rhadine
- Species: R. persephone

Binomial name
- Rhadine persephone Barr, 1974

= Rhadine persephone =

Rhadine persephone Tooth Cave ground beetle

Species of beetle

The Tooth Cave ground beetle, Rhadine persephone, is an endemic beetle that lives only in karst caves in Texas. These arthropods belong to the family Carabidae. The United States government considers these beetles endangered because they are only found in a single cave system. If these caves are destroyed, this beetle will likely go extinct. The cave system is currently threatened by pollution, urban development, and invasion by fire ants.

== Description ==
This species is a small reddish beetle about 7–8 mm (about ⅓ inch) long. It lives on the ground where it blends in with the silt on the cave floor. Because this beetle lives in caves, its eyes are not well-developed and it is unable to fly. The beetle's body is slender with long legs and long antennae.

== Life history ==
Details on the life history of the Tooth Cave ground beetle and its relatives in the Rhadine genus are not known. However, there is life history data for the related cave beetles Neaphaenops tellkampfii and Ptomaphagus hirtus. Scientists assume these species have similar life histories to the Tooth Cave ground beetle.

N. tellkampfii populations change seasonally with the highest populations of beetles occurring in summer and early fall. This matches the timing of when the beetle's prey is most abundant. Scientists estimate that the beetles live between one and two years.

P. hirtus does not show any courtship behavior before mating. After mating occurs, the female lays one egg in a random location on the cave floor and covers the egg with dirt. The egg is about 1 mm in length, oval in shape, and whitish in color. Mating occurs multiple times throughout the beetle's life.

Eggs take approximately 18.5 days to hatch. Once larvae emerge from their eggs, they remain in a larval stage for about 57 days. The larvae become pupae and remain in this form for 32 days. Adults emerge afterwards and are reproductive after 30 days, with an age of maturity of about four months. These beetles spend their entire lives underground in the cave system.

== Ecology ==
=== Diet ===
The Tooth Cave ground beetle is a predator and feeds on microarthropods and on the eggs of cave crickets. It is able to dig up cricket eggs when needed. Because it is only found in karst cave systems, it relies on these other cave organisms as food sources. Any impacts on other cave species would harm the feeding habits of this species. These beetles may also eat organic material that washes into the cave from the surface during rainstorms.

=== Behavior ===
This beetle finds its food by running around on the cave floor. It chases after its food and digs for cricket eggs. This beetle also hides under rocks, making it difficult for predators to find it. It is unable to fly.

The mating habits of this species are not known. However, Ptomaphagus hirtus is a cave beetle species that may show similar behaviors to the Tooth Cave ground beetle. P. hirtus does not display any courtship behavior before mating. When mating occurs, the female lays a single egg on the cave floor and covers the egg with dirt.

=== Habitat ===
The Tooth Cave ground beetle lives only in karst caves in Texas. Karst caves form when bedrock dissolves and creates cracks in the ground. Water enters the cracks and carves out features like caves. Tooth Cave ground beetles live on the floors of these caves, preferring dark and humid crevices to hide in. Because they only live in one cave system, there is little geographic variation in the habitat of this species.

== Population & geographic distribution ==
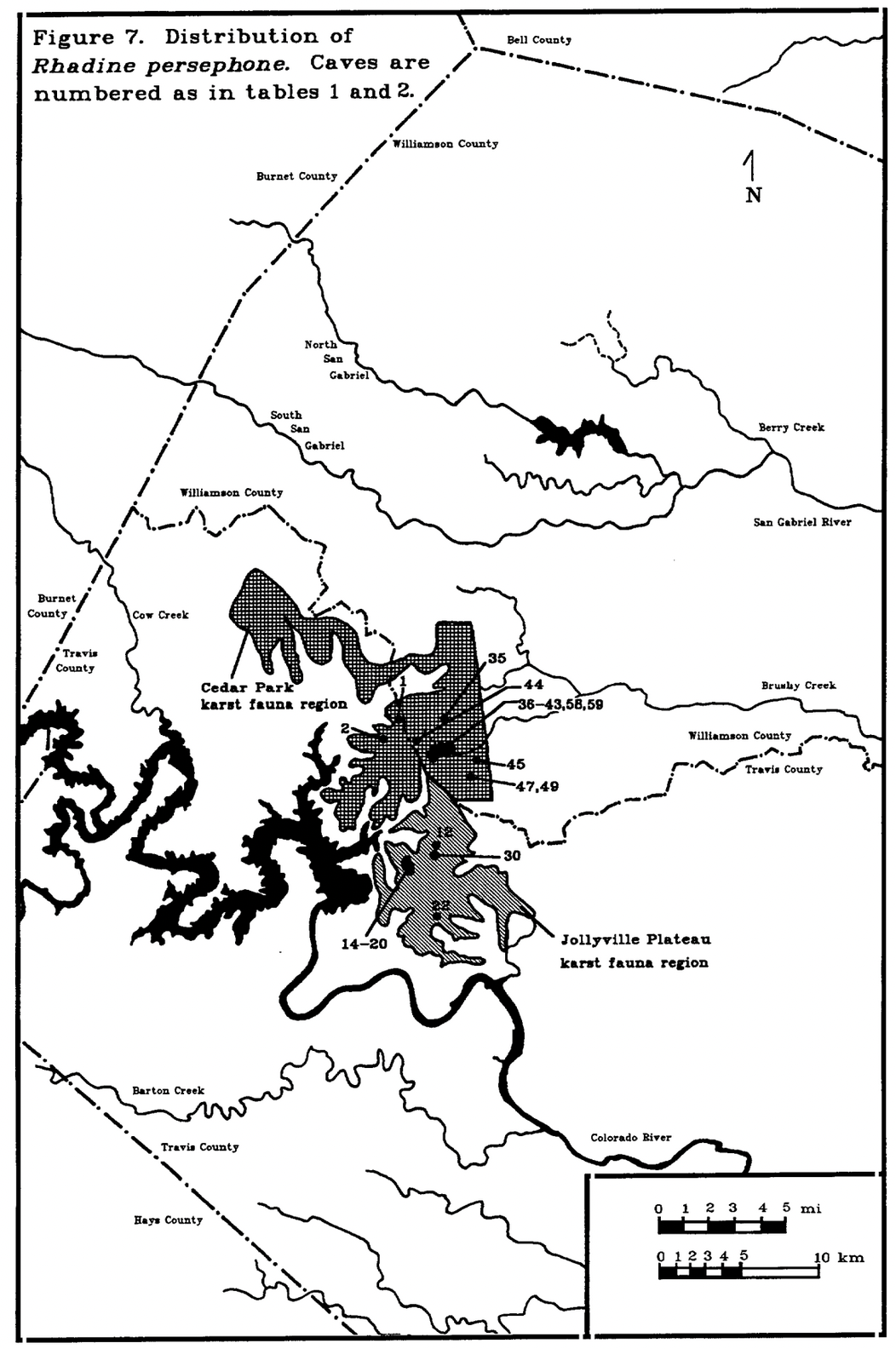
A map of the cave system containing the populations of Rhadine persephone

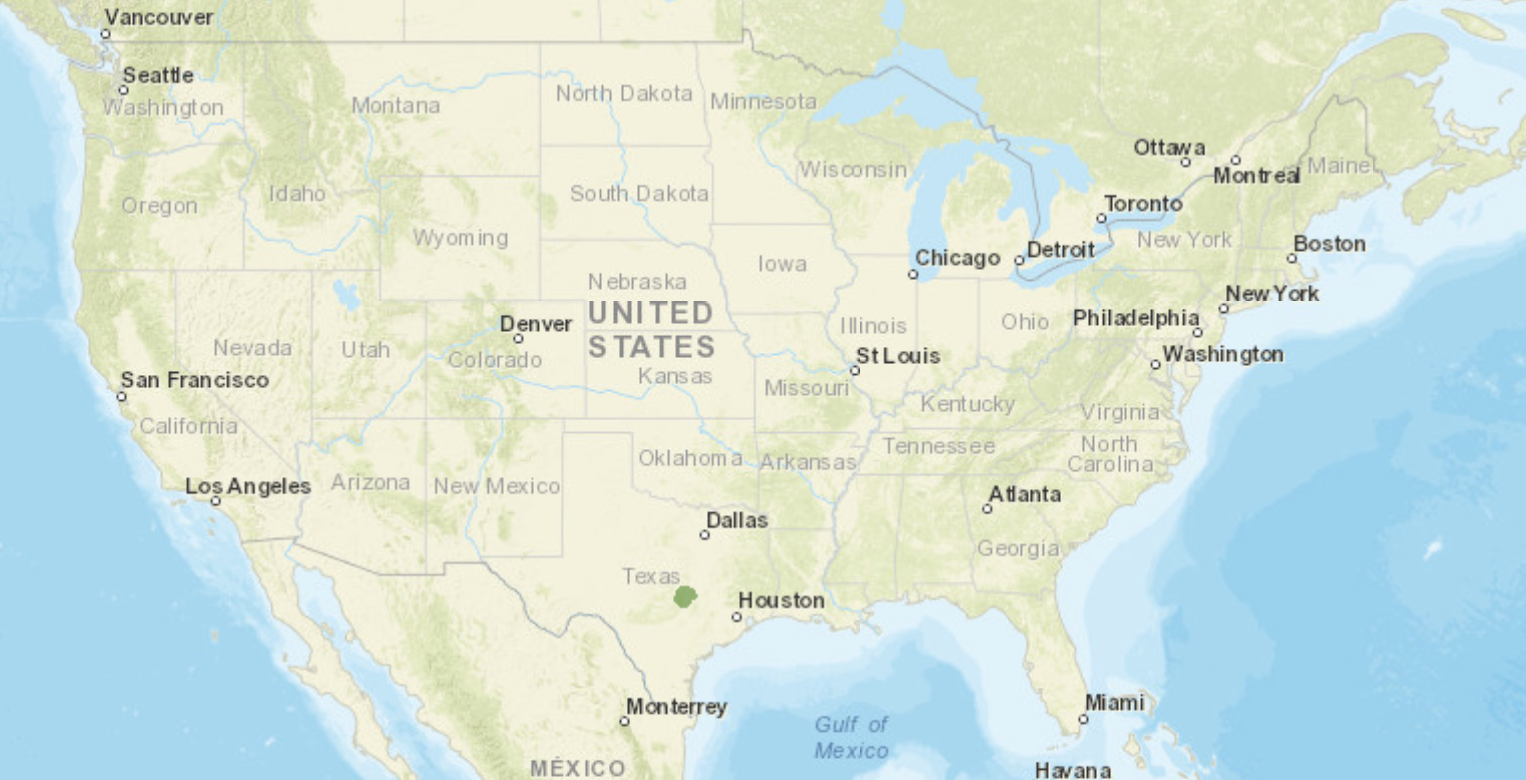
The range of Rhadine persephone

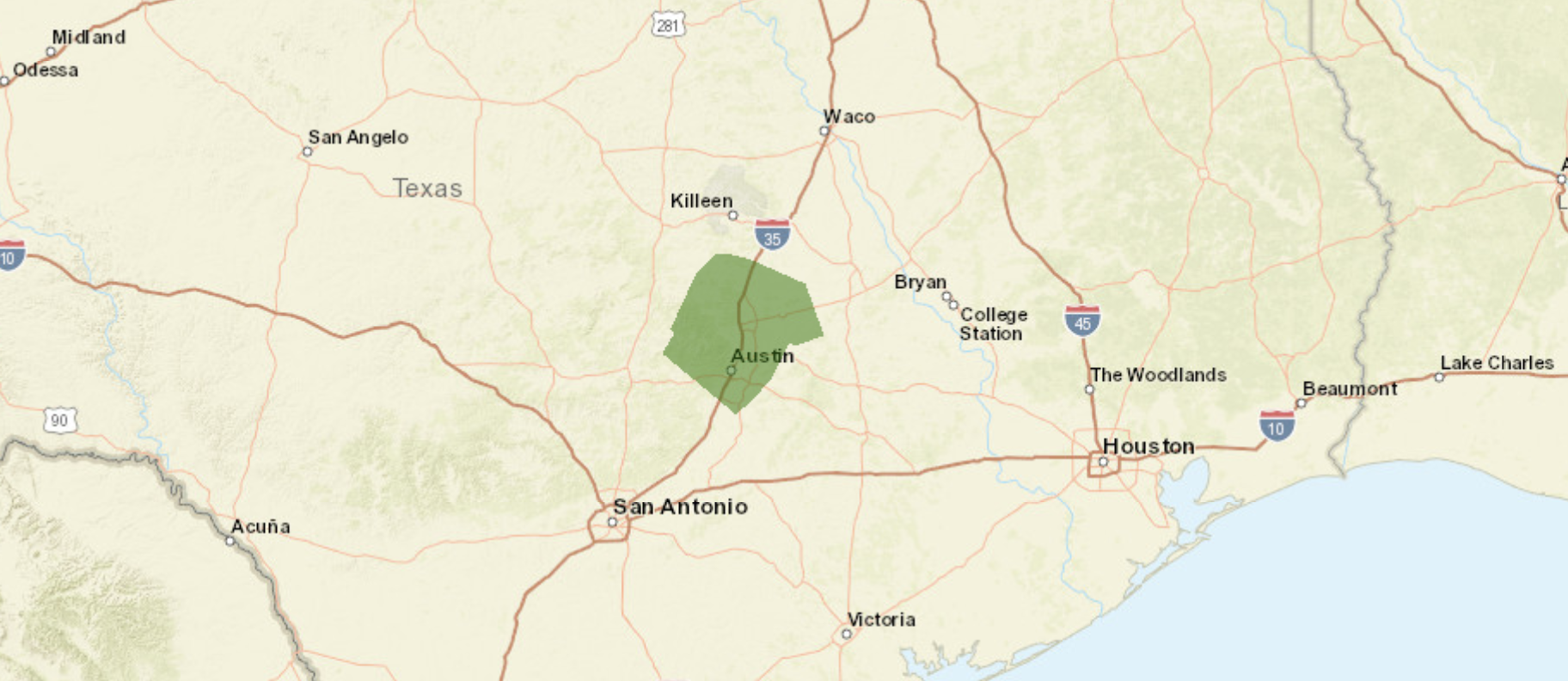
The range of Rhadine persephone

The Tooth Cave ground beetle has been confirmed to live in just 24 populations within caves in Travis and Williamson Counties. All 24 known populations of the beetle are within the same 20 square miles. The exact population of the species is unknown and difficult to estimate due to the limited access to the cave system. The cave system in which the beetle lives, was discovered in 1963 and includes Tooth, Amber, Kretschmarr, Kretschmarr Salamander, McDonald, and Root Caves. Most of these caves with known populations of the beetle are in the Cedar Park karst fauna region. The Tooth Cave ground beetle's limited population size and distribution can be attributed to the species' inability to colonize new habitats. The beetle cannot move significant distances on the surface and cannot reach other cave systems to expand its population.

== Listing under Endangered Species Act ==
The Tooth Cave ground beetle was petitioned to be placed on the endangered species list in 1985. It was initially placed on the endangered species list on September 16, 1988, and has not changed status.

A recovery plan was published in August 1994 for the Tooth Cave ground beetle and 6 other invertebrates.

== Major threats ==
Urban development in Travis County is the primary threat to the Tooth Cave ground beetle. The rapid expansion of the Austin metropolitan area has led to construction near the caves which serve as a habitat for the Tooth Cave ground beetle. Residential and industrial construction could directly destroy these caves. With only 20 square miles of geographic range, even limited habitat destruction poses a serious threat to the species. Human activity can also interrupt the regular presence of water in the caves, which many species depend upon. Because the cave system is so small, the habitats are particularly vulnerable to vandalism.

Development also increases the presence of pesticides, fertilizers, and other urban runoff into the caves. This pollution damages the fragile natural habitats of the caves and karsts in which the beetle lives. Imported predators such as red fire ants (Solenopsis invicta) disrupt the habitat of the beetle. Predatory species were brought into the area through landscaping. Lawns, buildings and shrubbery provide habitats for predators, which then disperse through the area. Populations of the beetle in more shallow and accessible caves in the system are particularly vulnerable to predation.

== Species status ==
As of the 2008 five year review, the Tooth Cave ground beetle's population is considered to be stable. Since conservation efforts have been successful, the species recovery priority was changed from High to Moderate priority. The species has been identified in 46 karst features. The review recommended no changes and stated that the species is making progress towards being downlisted in the future.

The Balcones Canyonland National Wildlife Refuge was established in 1996 to protect several species in the region, including karst fauna like the Tooth Cave ground beetle. This has benefited all species protected. One protected species in the refuge, the black-capped vireo, has even been removed from the endangered species list. The Texas Turnpike Authority conducted a review in 2005 and found that the Tooth Cave ground beetle was often found alongside a currently unknown species. Reports overall emphasize that conserving the Tooth Cave ground beetle also conserves a number of other species listed on the ESA. The permit for the Balcones Canyonland Conservation Plan (BCCP) will expire on May 2, 2026. A 2019 review recommended that the City of Austin and Travis County extend and modernize the plan, and noted that the BCCP has been more successful than expected. Future funding and protection may yield results that are greater than predicted by the 2008 report.

== Critical habitat and recovery plan ==
The Tooth Cave ground beetle shares critical habitat with a number of other karst fauna in the region. The critical habitat is composed of underground karst ecosystems with steady temperatures, high humidity, a rocky ground for animals to live in and around, and a healthy surface ecosystem surrounding the cave. The surface ecosystem provides nutrients to the cave and protects it from potential threats like fire ants and flooding.

A Karst Fauna Region (KFR) is a distinct region, such as a network of caves, that contains Karst Fauna Areas (KFA). KFAs are distinct areas that contain critical habitat that is likely to remain consistent in the future.

The original 1994 listing outlines a recovery plan for Rhadine persephone. The listing includes a plan for the Tooth Cave Ground Beetle to eventually be downlisted but not removed from the ESA listing. The plan requires that the Tooth Cave Ground Beetle be identified in at least two unique karst regions, with three or more protected karst areas per region, each with a stable population of Tooth Cave ground beetles. All of these areas must have been protected for five years, and must continue to be protected in perpetuity.

Several regions are potential targets for conservation. 57 Karst Fauna Regions have been identified overall. Of these, 48 are in areas under management. Two regions in Jollyville and Cedar Park have the potential to meet the critical habitat requirements. Both require increased protection and further study to demonstrate the presence of a healthy beetle population. Human activity has harmed several caves in the region, and managers recommend stronger enforcement of protections. Both of these regions are adjacent to housing developments in Austin.

The Jollyville KFR contains fifteen caves likely to contain beetles. These are the Spider, Galleyville, Stovepipe, and Jollyville Plateau caves. This KFR is spread across four tracts. With sufficient investigation, it may be found that the requirements for downlisting are met. The Cedar Park KFR contains thirty-three caves likely to have Tooth Cave Ground Beetle populations. Eight caves have been confirmed to contain a population as of 2003. There are two tracts containing three caves (Discovery Well, Broken Arrow, and Rolling Rock Cave) that are strong targets for conservation, although they are situated in an urban environment.
