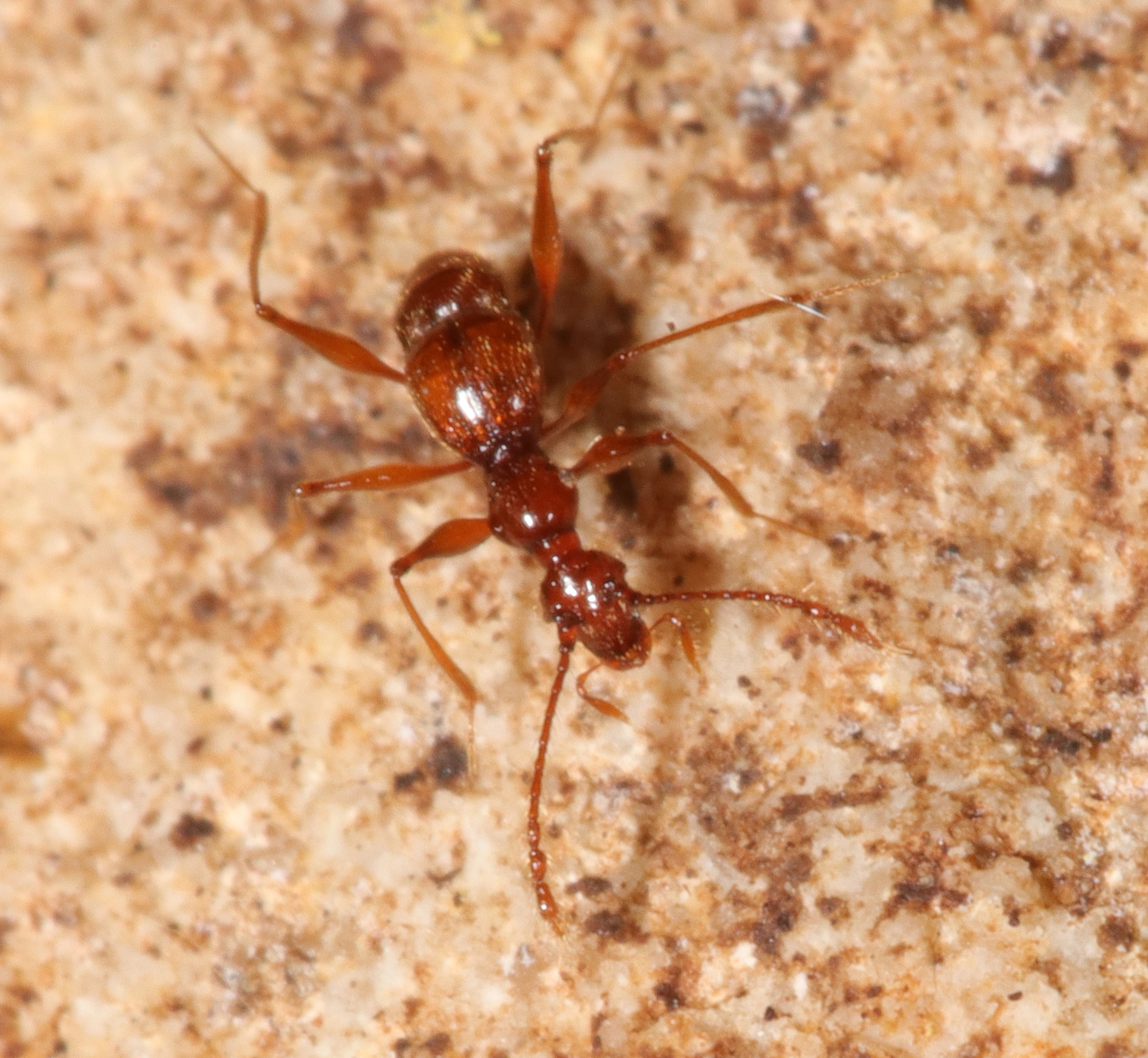
- Kretchmarr Cave mold beetle

Conservation status
- Critically Imperiled (NatureServe)

- Endangered (ESA)

Scientific classification
- Kingdom: Animalia
- Phylum: Arthropoda
- Class: Insecta
- Order: Coleoptera
- Suborder: Polyphaga
- Infraorder: Staphyliniformia
- Superfamily: Staphylinoidea
- Family: Staphylinidae
- Subfamily: Pselaphinae
- Genus: Texamaurops
- Species: T. reddelli

Binomial name
- Texamaurops reddelli Barr & Steeves, 1963

= Kretschmarr Cave mold beetle =

Species of beetle

The Kretschmarr Cave mold beetle (Texamaurops reddelli) is a small mold beetle.

== Biology ==
It is less than 1/8 inch long and their body color can range from a dark purple to a light reddish-brown color and is sparsely and weakly dotted with small pits. They have short wings and long legs.

The beetle lives under rocks and logs, in sinkholes, rotting wood, termite nests, and caves, although it is now only known to still exist in three caves in the Edwards Plateau, Travis County, Texas. Not all caves in the region have been surveyed, so this may be an underestimate. It lives in total darkness so it has no use for eyes and uses elaborate appendages and beefed up nerve centers to interpret slight air-pressure or temperature changes, sounds, and smells. This sensory equipment helps the beetle travel, sense objects, and ambush prey.

There is no distinct reproduction pattern for the beetle and may reproduce at any time of the year if conditions are steady. Little is known about daily life of the mold beetle because of their secretive habitats. When going to observe them, they are rarely found and when they are found it is usually only one or two specimens. They are so secretive that finding an individual is a rare event. It is also very hard to distinguish Texamaurops reddelli from other beetles in the Pselaphinae subfamily.

Only upon microscopic study can the beetle be distinguished by its ocular knobs on its head. This makes it hard to identify the beetles in the field.

== Other endangered karst invertebrates (troglobites) ==
There are several other karst invertebrates that are also endangered in Travis County and neighboring Williamson County. They include Texella reddelli (Bee Creek cave harvestman), Texella reyesi (Bone Cave harvestman), Tartarocreagris texana (Tooth Cave pseudoscorpion), Neoleptoneta myopica (Tooth Cave spider), Rhadine persephone (Tooth Cave ground beetle), Batrisodes texanus (Coffin Cave mold beetle). All of these karst invertebrates are considered troglobites, which are characterized by living their entire lives underground, have small or absent eyes, elongated appendages, and other adaptations to their subterranean environment.

A widely accepted theory for the evolution of troglobites is that during a series of climatic changes in the Pleistocene epoch, certain creatures wandered into the caves for a more stable environment and over time evolved into the invertebrates they are today. Troglobites prefer to inhabit the dark zone of the cave where the humidity and temperature are relatively constant. High temperatures nearly 100% humidity is required for most troglobites.

There are some 7,700 species of troglobites, but this is probably only a small portion of the population because most of them have not been discovered. Even though they spend their entire life under ground in total darkness they depend very much on the world above. Rootlets from the trees above crawl down into the caves providing bug food. The bugs that feed on these rootlets are the troglobites prey. Moisture and heat from above and the natural springs within the caves provide the humidity that is needed to support their life. Because all of these invertebrates share similar habitats, they face many of the same threats as the Kretschmarr Cave mold beetle that has led to their endangerment.

== Threats ==
The Kretschmarr Cave mold beetle was first listed on the endangered species list on September 16, 1988. Threats to the beetle include loss of habitat due to urban development, invasive species, and mining. Urban development is the number one threat to the beetle and affects their karst environment in many different ways. For instance, urban development may lead to the filling in or collapse of caves, alteration of drainage patterns, alteration of surface plant and animal communities, as well as contamination and human visitation.

Many caves are filled in or collapsed during road and building construction. A solid foundation is required for construction to take place so if there is a cave in the way it will be collapsed and filled for a sturdy foundation. Road development destroys a majority of the karst habitats where the beetles live. It is estimated that 10% of all caves in Travis County are destroyed every ten years. Some ranchers even lead to the problem. Many of them fill the entrances to the caves so their livestock do not roam into the caves. This blocks the air movement in the cave changing the conditions in the cave. If conditions are not correct: the beetle will die. Large paved areas and drainage systems that are put in during urban development alter the natural drainage patterns causing major problems to karst environments. This environment depends on air filled gaps and infiltration from water above, diverting water away from a cave can dry it up killing all the species inside. If water is diverted into a cave it can flood and alter living conditions. Altering surface plant and animal communities affects karst environments as well. When these communities are removed for development many of the nutrients that originally entered the cave are lost. Without nutrients the beetle and other karst invertebrates can not survive.

If a substantial amount of vegetation is removed, infiltration will increase changes in their delicate habitat. The caves also face the threat of contamination when developing close to their habitat. Karst is very susceptible to groundwater contamination so when sewer and drainage systems are put in contaminated water can enter the caves. Many of the caves in Travis County are used for disposal of refuse and have probable killed most organisms within the cave. Farming as well leads to the contamination of habitat. Fertilizers, pesticides, and other agricultural waste can infiltrate through the ground contaminating the groundwater that enters the cave. The final way urban development has increased the loss of habitat is by increased human visitation. When humans build close to a species habitat it likely that visitation to the cave will increase. Some species are scared off by new visitation. If one species leaves it often affects the whole chain of that ecosystem. Some caves are vandalized so much so that it changes the environment in which the beetle lives.

The introduction of invasive species, mainly the red fire ant, has been known to disrupt the beetle's environment. Shallow caves in which the beetle live are relatively easy to enter and make them vulnerable to invasion of fire ants and other exotic species. Fire ant multiple-queen colonies pose a threat; they occur in very dense concentrations of about 750–5000 mounds per acre. They can enter through the cave entrance or crawl through small holes or cracks and attack the karst species where humans cannot observe. Slow moving adults, nymphs, and eggs are most vulnerable to fire ant predation. More than 50% of the caves observed had fire ants present. This is a sign that the fire ant has taken over or will eventually take over the habitat. Even if the fire ant does not prey on the beetle, it is likely to change the links that are critical in the food chain.

Mining and quarrying pose a threat to all species, cave dwellers and land dwellers that live in or around the karst habitat. Karst offers a good amount of limestone and there are several limestone quarries in the area. They blast the limestone first then haul it off with heavy machinery. The roads that are built to mine the limestone can break up habitat for miles. All of this destroys caves and surrounding land where the Kretschmarr Cave mold beetle and other karst fauna live.

== Conservation and recovery plan ==
Due to all of these threats a recovery plan was issued for endangered karst invertebrates. The plan was not issued until 1994, six years after it was listed endangered. Increased education on the distribution of the invertebrates and the threats that led to its endangerment took place during the six years before the plan was issued. Surveys were taken to help define the taxonomy and distribution of all karst fauna. One of these studies was conducted be the Texas Department of Transportation that studied the karst environment along Highway 45 in Texas.

Two surveyors (Elliott and Reddell) from the U.S. Fisheries and Wildlife Department took extensive surveys that helped better define the distribution and habitat of karst invertebrates. Also numerous fire ant control studies took place. The USFWD funded a study that included three types of treatments. The first included using nearly boiling water to pour in their mounds. The others included the chemicals Logic and Amdro. These chemicals are poisonous to arthropods and may end up killing the endangered species that is trying to be saved. Initially the treatments were affective, but areas were quickly re-infested.

With a better knowledge of the beetles distribution and habitat a recovery plan was formed. The first plan of action was to identify the areas targeted for recovery. It was decided that if any of the four of the karst invertebrates (Neoleptoneta myopica, Tartarocreagris texana, Texamaurops reddelli, or Batrisodes texanus) inhabited a cave it needed to be deemed a long term protection plan. If a habitat is to be recovered areas that contain high diversity and contain other rare fauna should be chosen. The second part of the recovery plan was to decide the size of area needed to save them. Areas of large continuous karst landscape must be implicated to ensure the survival of the invertebrates.

Groundwater movements, topography, and drainage pattern were taken into place when selecting areas for recovery. All of these things must be perfect for a successful recovery. Also the type of use for surrounding land must be considered. If the area is to close to development, many factors can threaten its recovery including the threats listed above. The final step of the plan included land acquisition, conservation easements, and cooperative agreements with landowners. This final is very important. Without the land needed to save the invertebrates the recovery can not take place and the endangered species will become extinct.
