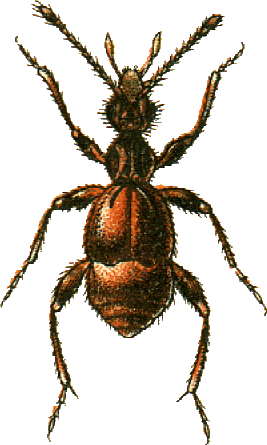
- Batrisus oculatus

Scientific classification
- Kingdom: Animalia
- Phylum: Arthropoda
- Clade: Pancrustacea
- Class: Insecta
- Order: Coleoptera
- Suborder: Polyphaga
- Infraorder: Staphyliniformia
- Family: Staphylinidae
- Subfamily: Pselaphinae
- Supertribe: Batrisitae; Reitter, 1882

= Batrisitae =

Batrisitae Temporal range: Priabonian–present, 37.71–0 Ma

Supertribe of beetles

Batrisitae is a supertribe of ant-loving beetles, subfamily Pselaphinae, in the family Staphylinidae. There are 239 genera and more than 2,000 accepted species in Batrisitae.

== Tribes ==
The following tribes are accepted within the supertribe Batrisitae:

- Amauropini Jeannel, 1948 (155 species in 13 genera)
- Batrisini Reitter, 1882 (2,003 species in 224 genera)
- Thaumastocephalini Poggi, Nonveiller, Colla, Pavićević & Rada, 2001 (9 species in 2 genera)

=== Selected genera ===
Some genera with pages in Wikipedia:

- Arthmius LeConte, 1849
- Batrisodes Reitter, 1882
- Texamaurops Barr & Steeves, 1963
- Tribasodites Jeannel, 1960
