= Batrisini =

Scientific classification
- Kingdom: Animalia
- Phylum: Arthropoda
- Clade: Pancrustacea
- Class: Insecta
- Order: Coleoptera
- Suborder: Polyphaga
- Infraorder: Staphyliniformia
- Family: Staphylinidae
- Subfamily: Pselaphinae
- Supertribe: Batrisitae
- Tribe: Batrisini; Reitter, 1882

Tribe of beetles

Batrisini is a tribe of rove beetles in the supertribe Batrisitae. It was first described by Reitter in 1882. It contains 4 subtribes, 224 genera, and 1,992 accepted species. Recorded observations of members of Batrisini have been made mostly in Japan, the United States, Costa Rica, France, Mexico, Ecuador, and Brazil.

== Subtribes ==
- Ambicocerina
- Batrisina
- Leupeliina
- Stilipalpina
