= Njegoš (disambiguation) =

Njegoš refers to Petar II Petrović-Njegoš, commonly referred to as simply Njegoš.

Njegoš may also refer to:

- Njegoš (given name)
- Njegoš Mountain, a mountain in Montenegro
- Mausoleum of Njegoš, a mausoleum of Petar II Petrović-Njegoš in Montenegro

== See also ==
- Njegoš's Testament Church, a church in Lovćen, Montenegro
- Order of Njegoš
- Njegoševo
