= Cetinje shooting =

Cetinje shooting may refer to:

- 2022 Cetinje shooting, which occurred in Cetinje in August 2022
- 2025 Cetinje shootings, which occurred in Cetinje in January 2025
