= Montenegro shooting =

Montenegro shooting may refer to:

- 2022 Cetinje shooting, which occurred in Cetinje in 2022
- 2025 Cetinje shootings, which occurred in Cetinje in 2025
