= Štirovnik =

Peak on Mount Lovćen

- Штировник
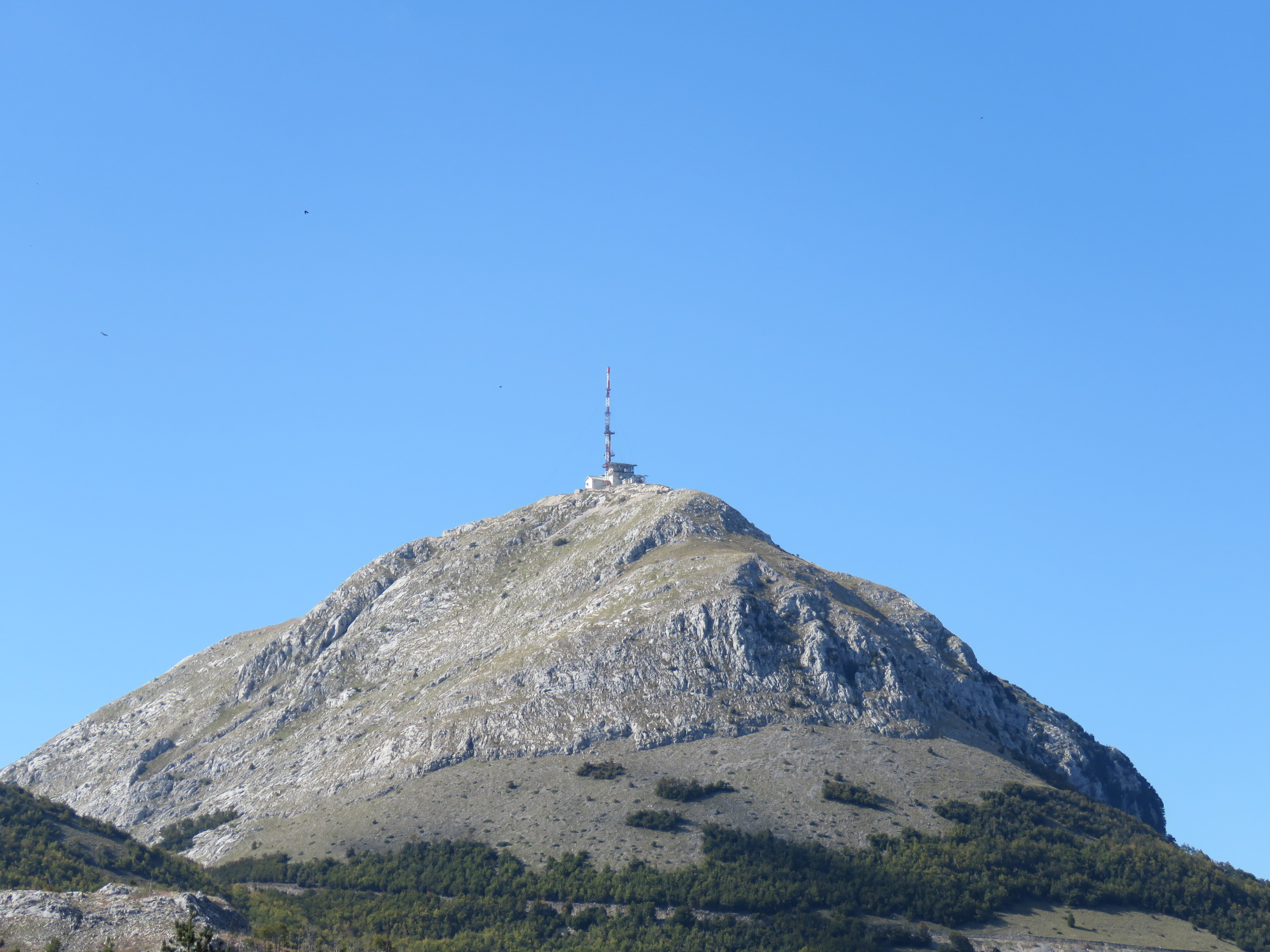

Highest point
- Elevation: 1,749 m (5,738 ft)
- Coordinates: 42°23′56″N 18°49′06″E

Geography
- Location: Cetinje Municipality, Montenegro
- Parent range: Lovćen

Geology
- Mountain type: Limestone

Stirovnik (Serbian: Штировник) is the highest peak of the Lovćen mountain range in Montenegro with an elevation of 1,749 meters (5,738 ft) above sea level. Its summit is occupied by a telecommunications tower and a military facility that restricts public access. Consequently, access to the very top is not permitted for the general public or tourists, making significantly less visited than the nearby and more accessible secondary peak of Lovćen, Jezerski vrh (1,657 m), which is also the site of the Njegos Mausoleum.
