= Njegoš (given name) =

Njegoš is a given name. People with the given name include:

- Njegoš Goločevac, Serbian footballer
- Njegoš Janjušević, Serbian footballer
- Njegoš Kupusović, Serbian footballer
- Njegoš Petrović (born 1999), Serbian footballer
- Njegoš Sikiraš, Bosnian basketball player

== See also ==
- Njegoš (disambiguation)
- Njegoševo
