= 2025 Velestovo shootings =

Shooting spree in Montenegro

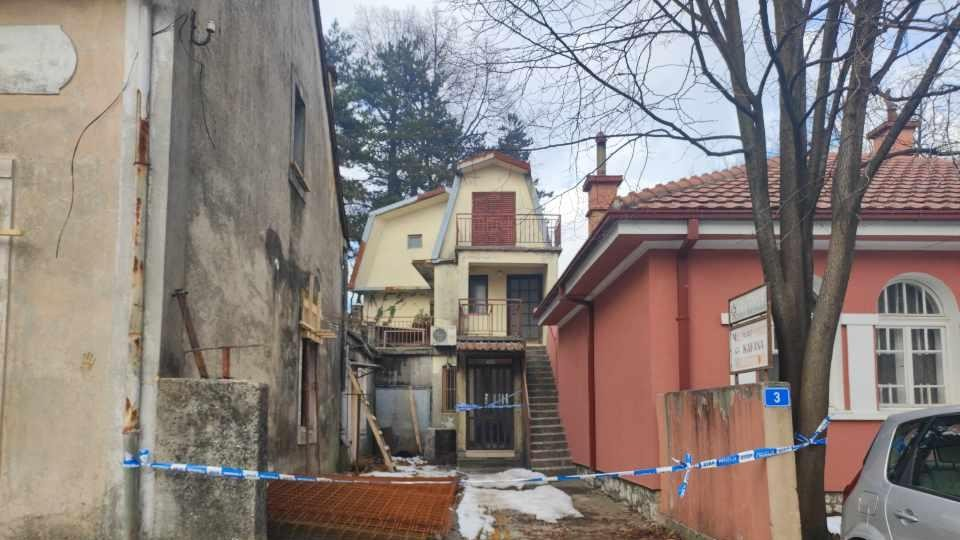
- Police tape at the scene of Kafana Velestovo, Cetinje one of the locations
- Location: 42°23′26.8″N 18°55′29.9″E; Velestovo, Bajice, Cetinje, Montenegro
- Date: 1 January 2025 c. 17:30 (CET)
- Attack type: Mass shooting, shooting spree, murder-suicide, pedicide
- Weapon: 9mm handgun
- Deaths: 14 (including the perpetrator)
- Injuries: 3
- Perpetrator: Aco Martinović
- Motive: Retaliation for earlier brawl

On 1 January 2025, Aco Martinović killed thirteen people and wounded three others during five separate shootings in Velestovo, Bajice, Cetinje, Montenegro, before killing himself later on the same day. It is the deadliest mass shooting in the country's history, and the second mass shooting in Cetinje after the 2022 Cetinje shooting.

== Shootings ==
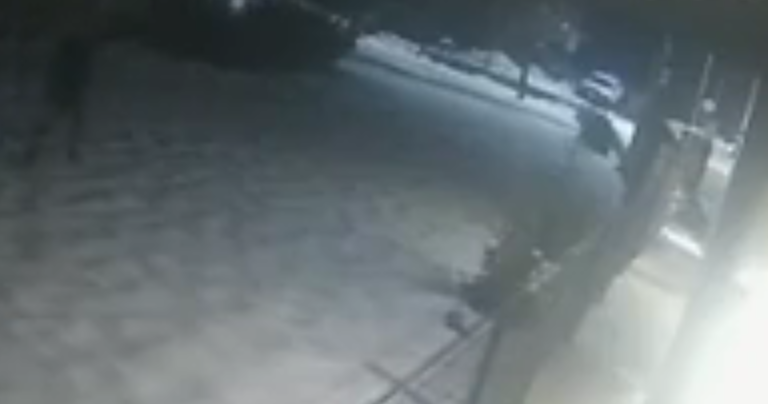
A CCTV still of Martinović walking to the bar shortly before the shooting

At around 17:30 CET (UTC+01:00) on 1 January 2025, a brawl erupted inside a bar in Cetinje. After the fight, the gunman left the scene and returned to his home to get his gun. Martinović returned to the bar and opened fire, killing four men and seriously wounding four others in Kafić Velestovo (Velestovo Tavern), Velestovo, Cetinje. He then moved to another location, killing four more people. He escaped again and moved to two more locations, where he killed two children and two adults. Some of the dead included the owner of the bar and his two children, who were aged 8 and 13.

Authorities blocked roads from Cetinje to search for the suspect, while special forces were deployed to assist. Several of the dead were later confirmed to have been killed in the village of Bajice. After being surrounded by police, the suspect shot himself in the head near his home, in the Cetinje suburb of Humci, and died while being transported to a hospital on the morning of 2 January. Several of the victims were transported to a hospital in Podgorica, with four in critical condition.

Martinović had been detained in the past for possession of illegal firearms, as well as domestic violence. He had also received a suspended sentence in 2005 for violent behaviour. He was described as having drunk alcohol all day before the shooting.

Police recovered a 9mm handgun, 37 casings, and 80 additional rounds of ammunition from the gunman at the scene.

== Perpetrator ==
The gunman was identified as 45 year-old Aco Martinović (Montenegrin: Ацо Мартиновић) (c. 1979 - January 1st 2025), who worked in a self-ran automobile paint shop in Cetinje, Martinović was unmarried and had no children. According to Montenegrin police records, Martinović had been known to law enforcement for two decades. His first documented criminal offense was in 2005, when he received a suspended sentence for violent behaviour.

Martinović lived in the Bajice settlement near Cetinje. Distant relatives and neighbours described him as having been generally quiet and withdrawn in his daily life, they also noted that there were few indications in his regular routine to suggest he was capable of mass violence.

Over the years, authorities noted "antisocial behavioral patterns". Following a search of his home which was conducted on 28 November 2022, two air rifles, 43 bullets in various caliber sizes, and IEDs were seized. After the search, police requested a psychiatric evaluation. Martinović was prescribed medical therapy through the local health center in Cetinje rather than being institutionalized in a specialized facility.

== Victims ==
The perpetrator initially killed twelve people, and four others had life-threatening injuries. The victims killed comprised two boys aged 8 and 13, seven men, and three women. Among the victims were two relatives of singer and Zvezde Granda winner Darko Martinović, the bar owner's nephews, family members of the perpetrator including his sister, and other people that he knew. On 9 January, an injured victim died from their injuries, raising the death toll to thirteen.

== Reactions ==
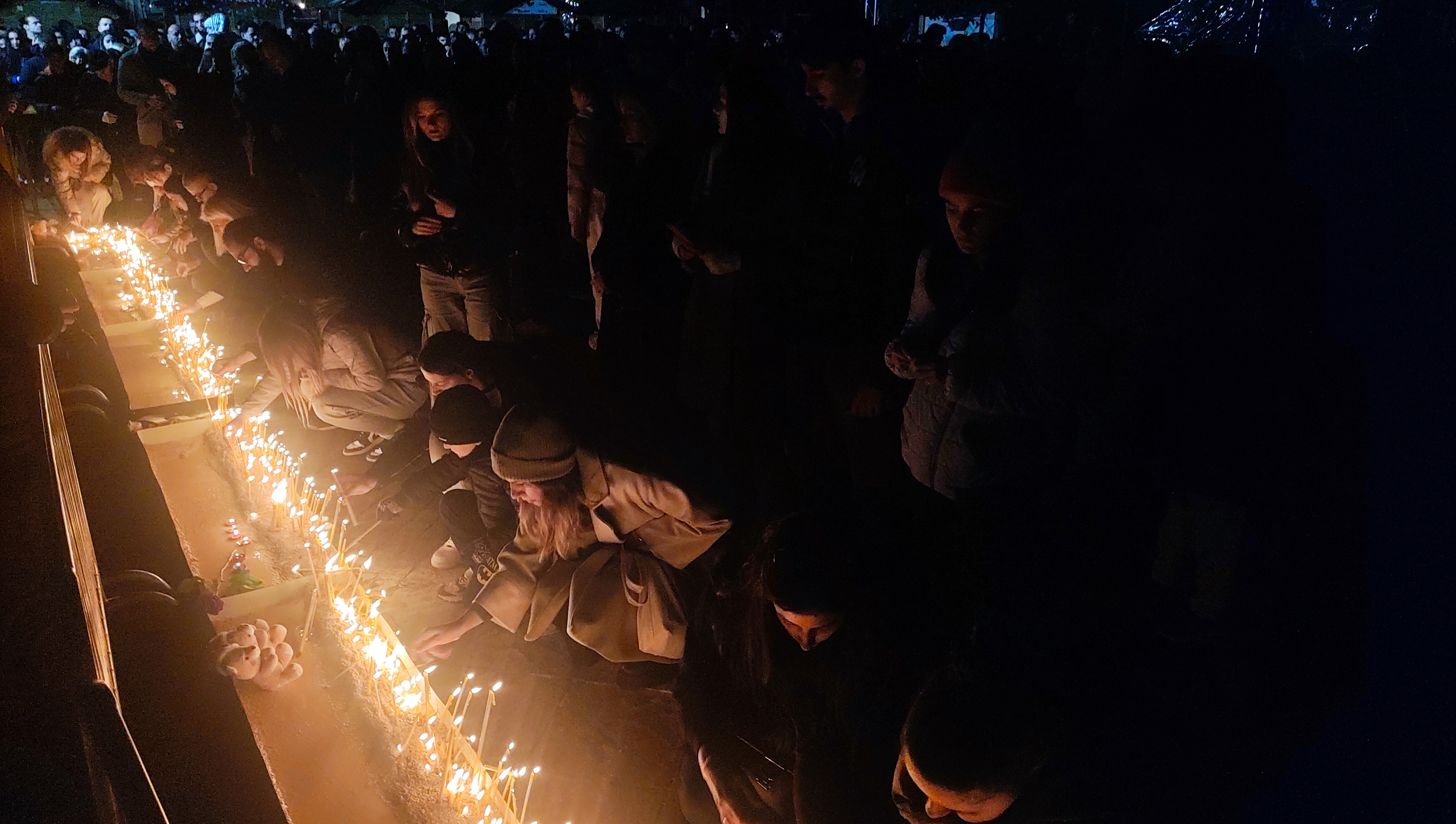
Residents lighting candles for the victims of the shootings

President Jakov Milatović said he was shocked and stunned by the tragedy, tweeting that "Instead of holiday joy ... we have been gripped by sadness over the loss of innocent lives". Prime Minister Milojko Spajić visited the hospital where some of the victims were being treated, and announced three days of national mourning and the cancellation of scheduled New Year celebrations. The government announced that it would consider tightening regulations on the ownership of firearms. Interior Minister Danilo Šaranović said the shooting was a "consequence of disturbed interpersonal relations".

On 3 January, the National Security Council announced new gun safety measures that include new security and psychological checks for registered gun owners and harsh punishment for illegal weapons holders at the end of a two-month amnesty to surrender their firearms. That same day, 200 people protested outside government headquarters in Podgorica demanding the resignation of top security officials over the shooting. This was followed by another demonstration on 5 January demanding the resignations of Interior Minister Danilo Šaranović and Deputy Prime Minister for Security and Defence Aleksa Bečić.

== See also ==
- List of national days of mourning (2020–present)
- List of rampage killers in Europe
- Zrinski Topolovac shooting
