= 1993 Montenegrin independent championship =

The 1993 Montenegrin championship season was the unofficial futsal competition in Montenegro, during the time period of FR Yugoslavia. Championship was organised by clubs who supported the independence of Montenegro, but the results of league and final ranking were not recognised by Montenegrin Football Association.

Year before was held 1992 Montenegrin Championship in football but, because of conditions, Montenegrin independent championship became futsal league from season 1993.

Championship played in period February - November in 1993.

== Members ==
Previous season: 1992 Montenegrin Championship

In the Montenegrin independent championship 1993 participated 7 self-organized futsal clubs from municipalities of Cetinje, Kotor, Nikšić and Podgorica.

- KMF Cetinje - Cetinje
- KMF Crnogorac - Kotor
- KMF Onogošt - Nikšić
- KMF Gorica - Podgorica
- KMF Boka - Kotor
- KMF Crnogorac - Cetinje
- KMF Nikšić - Nikšić

== Venues ==
The competition was held at several school sport halls in Cetinje, Kotor and Podgorica. Few matches played on open air fields. Clubs from Nikšić played home games in Podgorica and Cetinje.

== Conditions ==
Due to the tense political situation in Montenegro, the championship was played without media attention. A lot of games have been played in secret.

== See also ==
- Montenegrin independent championship (1992-1999)
