= Old Royal Capital Cetinje =

Municipality of Montenegro

Old Royal Capital Cetinje Prijestonica Cetinje Пријестоница Цетиње
- Municipality
- Coat of arms

- Old Royal Capital Cetinje area in Montenegro
- Country: Montenegro
- Seat: Cetinje

Area
  - Total: 910 km^{2} (350 sq mi)

Population (2023)
  - Total: 14,494
  - Density: 16/km^{2} (41/sq mi)
- Postal code: 81250
- Area code: +382 41
- ISO 3166-2 code: ME-06
- Car plates: CT
- Climate: Cfb
- Website: www.cetinje.me

The Old Royal Capital Cetinje (Montenegrin: Prijestonica Cetinje / Пријестоница Цетиње) is one of the municipalities of Montenegro. Due to its former status as the capital of the old Kingdom of Montenegro, it is known as the "Old Royal Capital" (Prijestonica / Пријестоница), which is also translated in English as "Royal Town". Its center is the town of Cetinje and its territory, which covers an area of 910 km^{2}, is bordered by the Lovćen and Lake Skadar national parks. In 2023, the municipality of Cetinje had a population of 14,494.

== Geography ==
The Old Royal Capital of Cetinje is one of Montenegro's largest municipalities. Its territory covers 910 km^{2}, which represents 6.6% of the total area of the country. The town of Cetinje proper covers 6 km^{2} of this area.

The territory of the municipality of Cetinje is divided into two parts: the shores of Lake Skadar and its surrounding area, and a hilly, mountainous and karst zone. Both parts correspond to one of the historical regions of Old Montenegro, respectively the nahija of Rijeka and the nahija of Katun. Two national parks fall within the municipality's borders, Lovćen and Lake Skadar.

== Subdivisions ==
The municipality of Cetinje is subdivided into 25 local communities (Montenegrin: mjesne zajednice, singular: mjesna zajednica), bodies in which the citizens participate in decision-making about matters of relevance to the community in which they live.

Three of these local communities are located in urban areas, while twenty-two are located in rural areas.

=== Urban Local Communities ===
These are subdivisions of the municipality located within the town of Cetinje.

- Stari Grad ("Old Town")
- Nova Varoš ("New Town")
- Gruda - Donje polje

=== Rural Local Communities ===
These are subdivisions of the municipality located in rural areas outside the town of Cetinje.

- Bajice
- Bata
- Bokovo
- Gornji Ceklin
- Dobrska Župa
- Dobrsko Selo
- Dodoši
- Drušići
- Konak
- Kosijeri
- Ljubotinjsko-građanska
- Meterizi
- Njeguši
- Rvaši
- Rijeka Crnojevića (city settlement)
- Trešnjevo
- Ćeklići
- Ubli
- Čevo
- Štitari
- Žabljak Crnojevića
- Velestovo, Cetinje

== Municipal Parliament (2021–2025) ==
Skupština Prijestonice Cetinje is the Parliament of Old Royal Capital Cetinje. Local parliament is made up of 33 deputies, or odbornici (councillors) in Montenegrin. It is elected by universal ballot and is presided over by a speaker called the Predsjednik Skupštine (President of Parliament).

The composition of the parliament as of 2021 is as follows:

Party / Coalition	Seats	Local government
DPS	10 / 33	Opposition
SDP	8 / 33	Government
URA	4 / 33	Support
ZEP	4 / 33	Opposition
DCG	3 / 33	Support
SGLSCG	3 / 33	Government
SD	1 / 33	Opposition

== Demographics ==
According to the 2023 census, the municipality of Cetinje had a population of 14,494, with the following ethnic and religious composition:

Old Royal Capital of Cetinje (2023)
Montenegrins	91.07%
Serbs	4.82%
Others	2.88%
Undeclared	1.23%

Old Royal Capital of Cetinje (2023)
Eastern Orthodox	91.83%
Roman Catholic	0.94%
Islam	0.77%
Atheist	3.42%
Others	1.50%
Undeclared	1.54%

Historical population
Year	Pop.	±%
1948	25,114	—
1953	25,549	+1.7%
1961	23,503	−8.0%
1971	22,024	−6.3%
1981	20,213	−8.2%
1991	20,307	+0.5%
2003	18,482	−9.0%
2011	16,757	−9.3%
2023	14,494	−13.5%

== Gallery ==
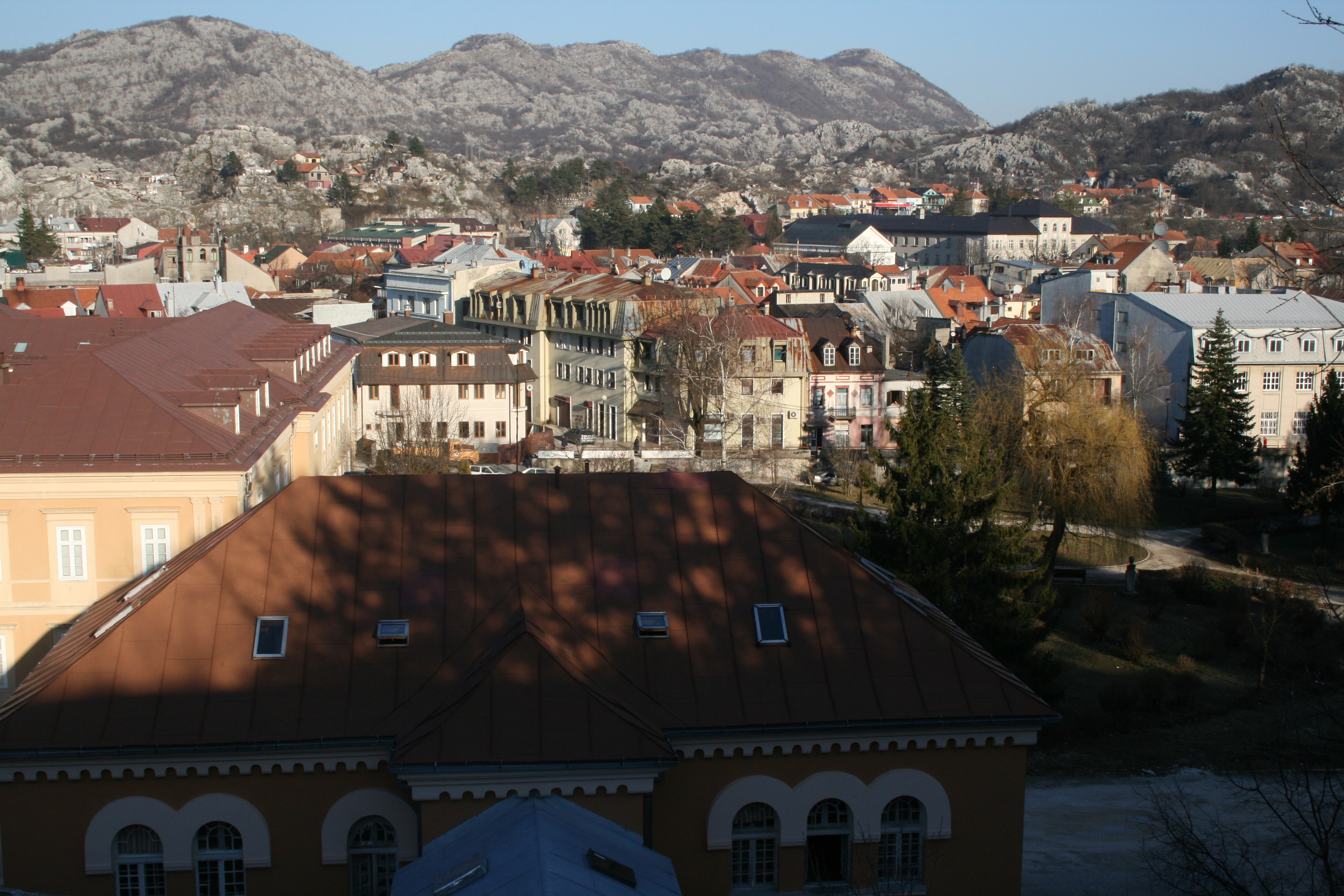
Town of Cetinje

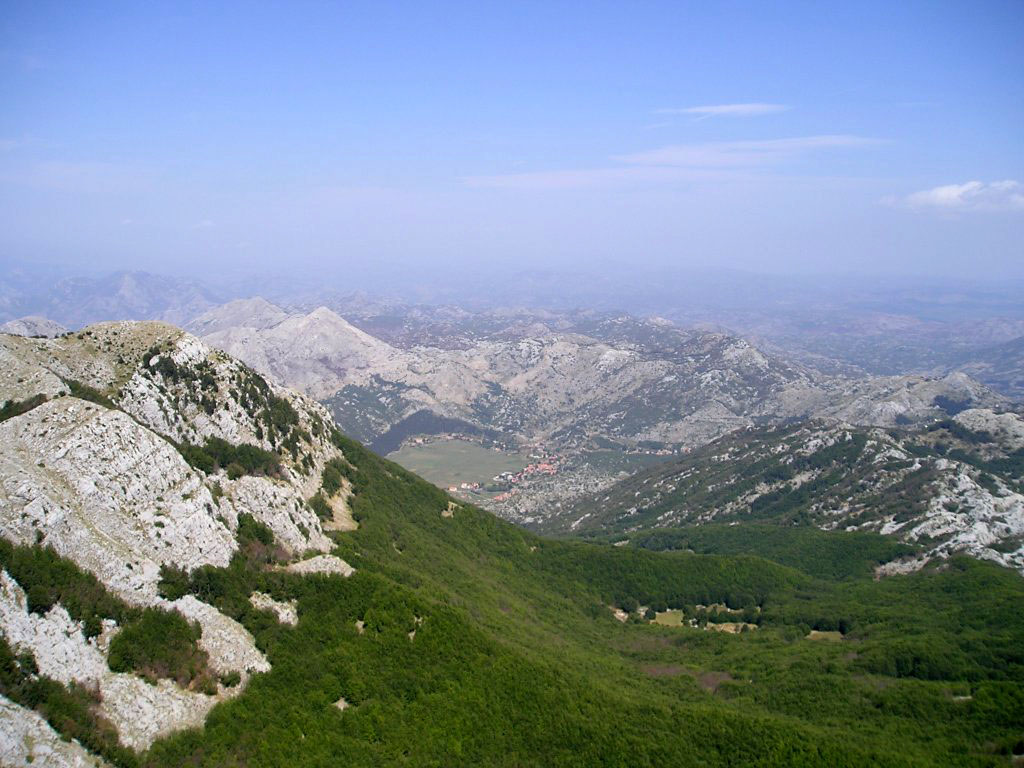
Lovćen National Park

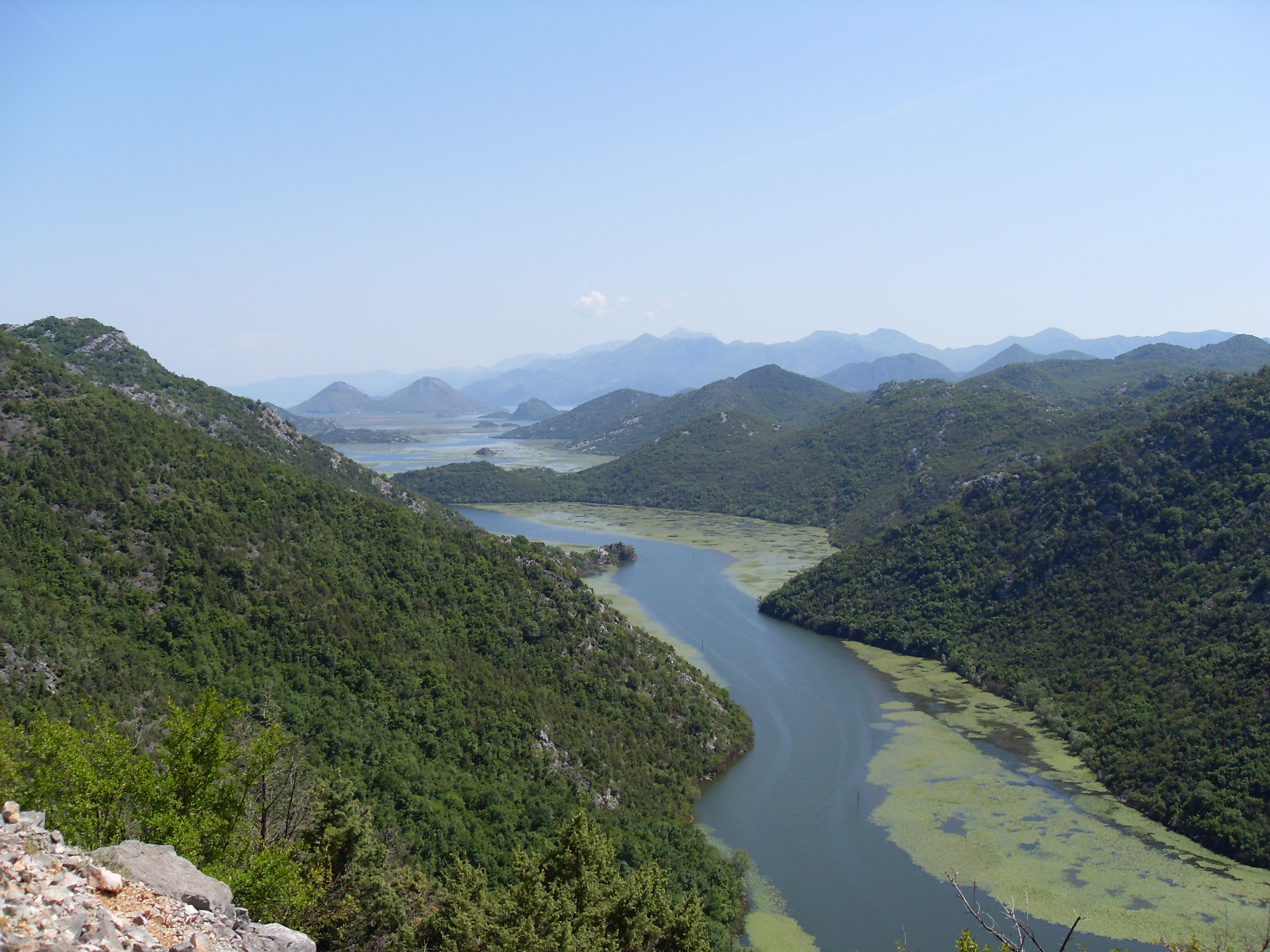
Skadar Lake

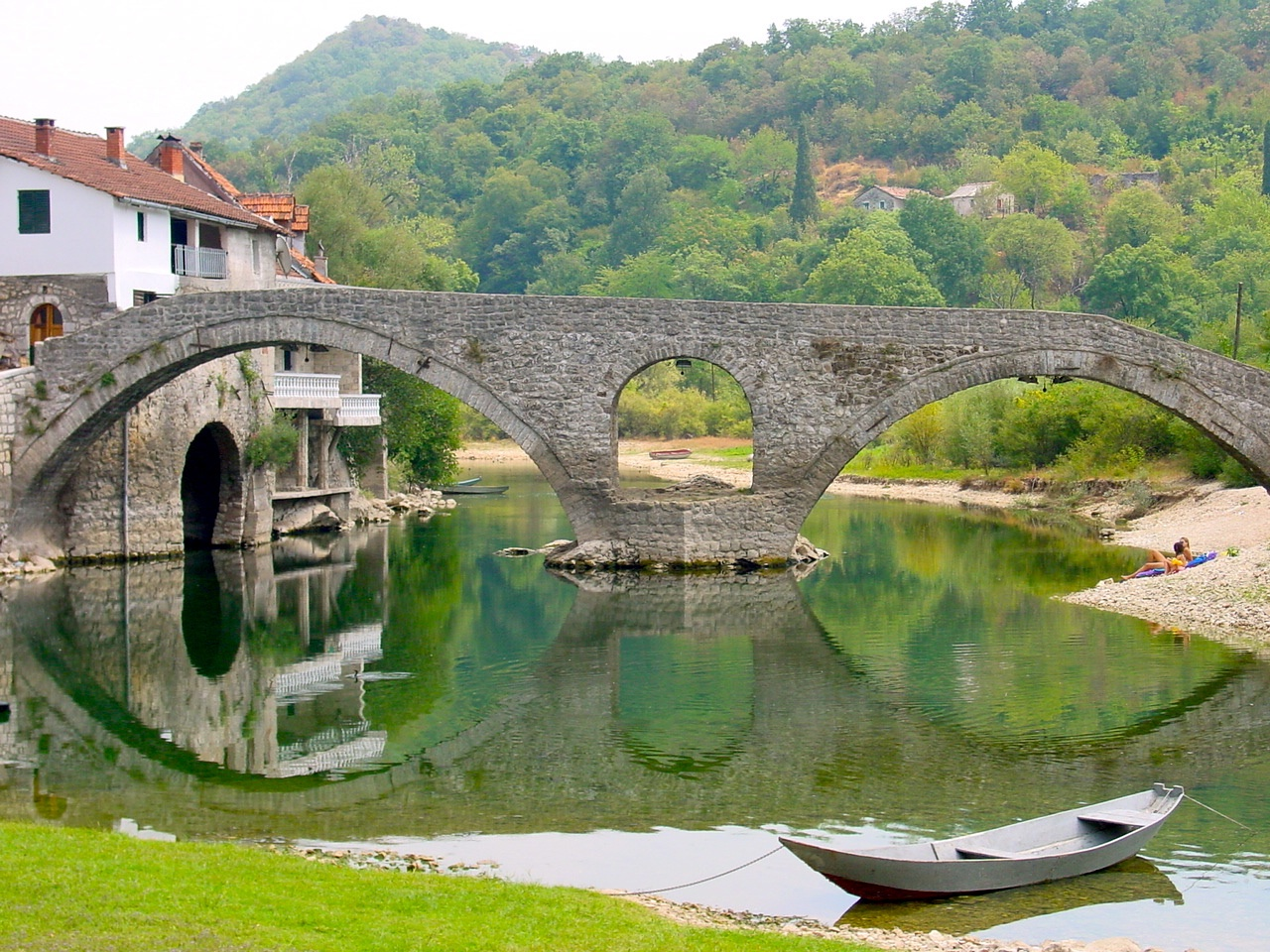
Rijeka Crnojevića

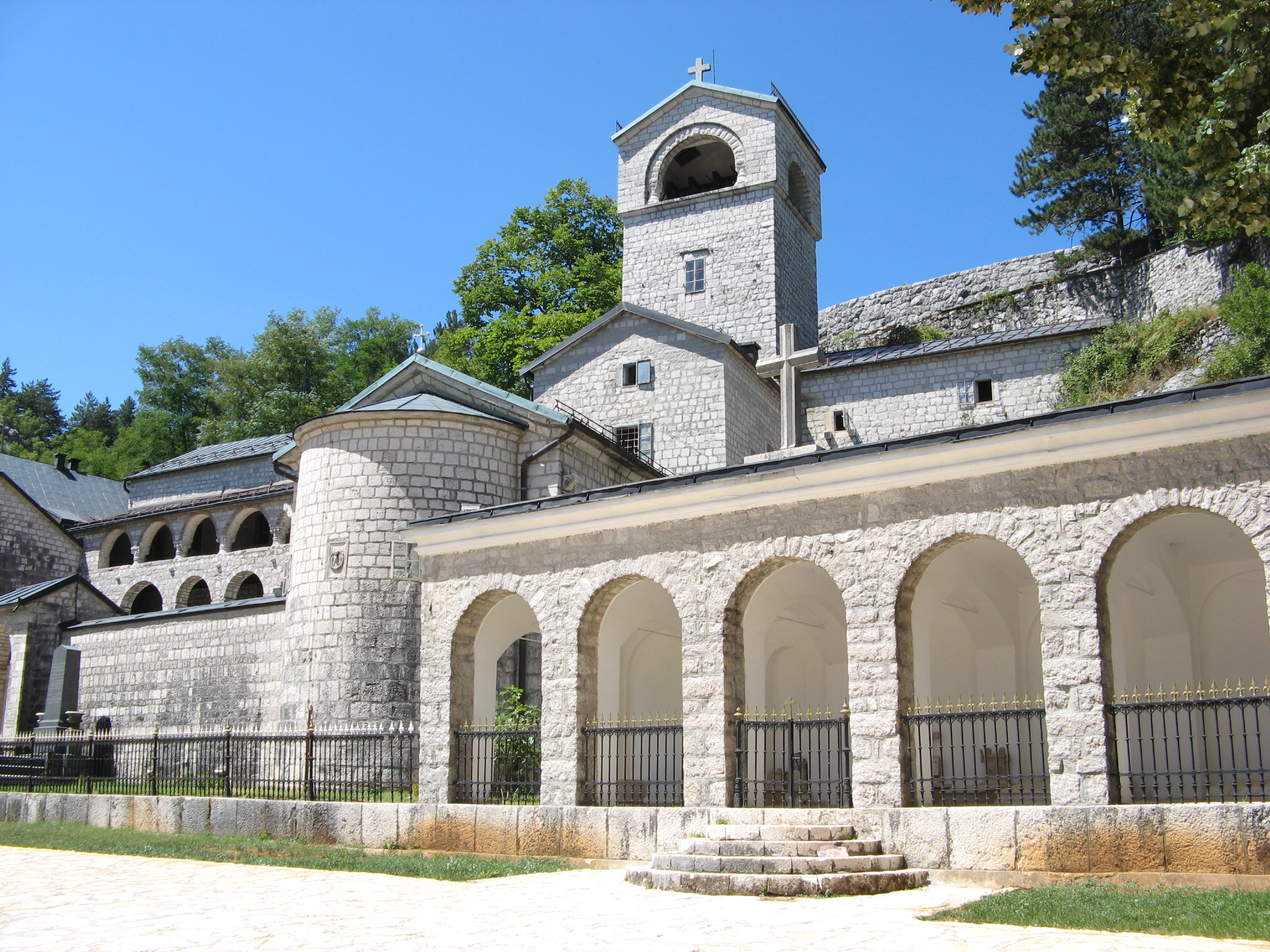
Eastern Orthodox monastery of Cetinje

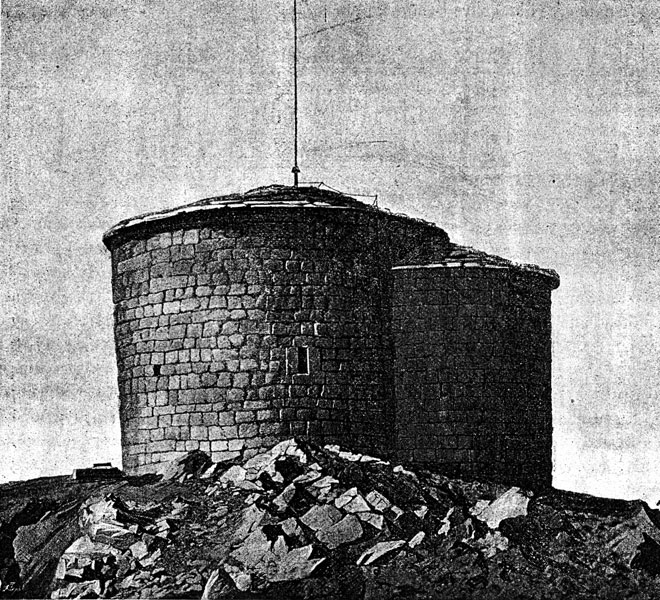
Njegoš's Testament church

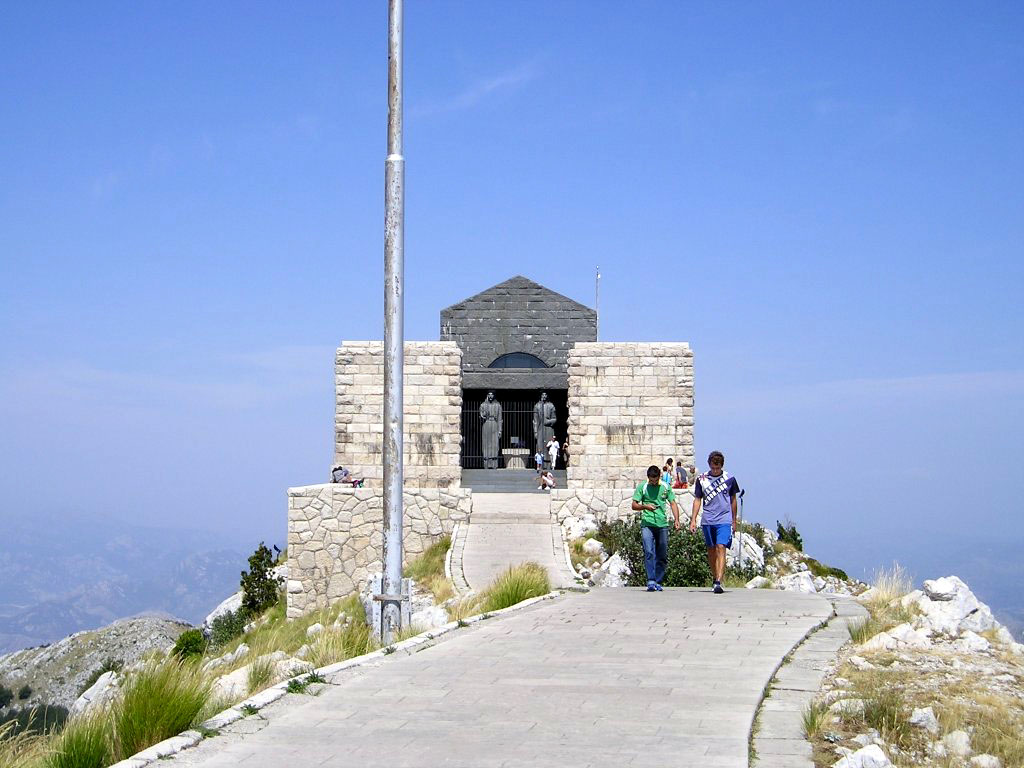
Mausoleum of Njegoš

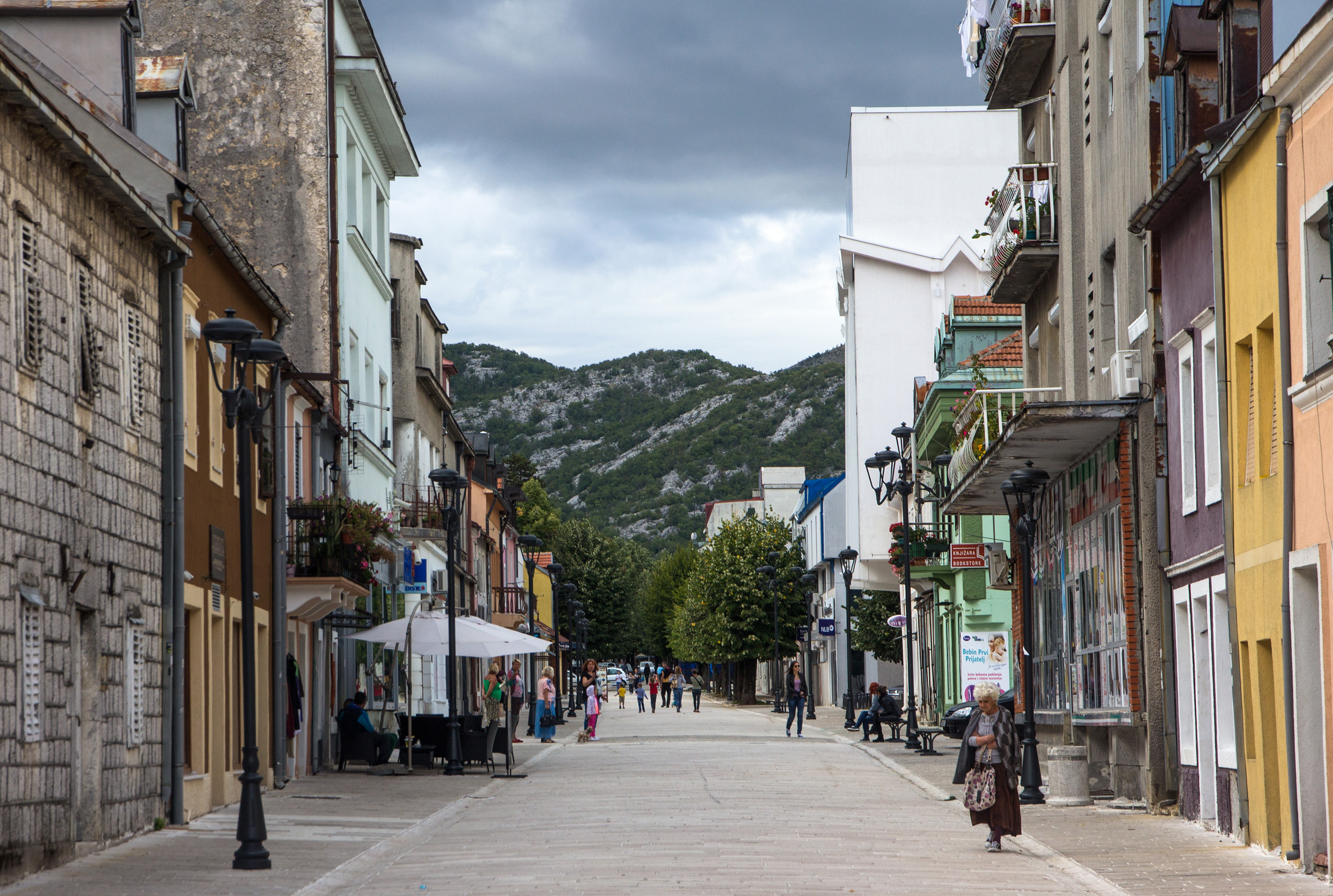
Street in Cetinje, 2015.

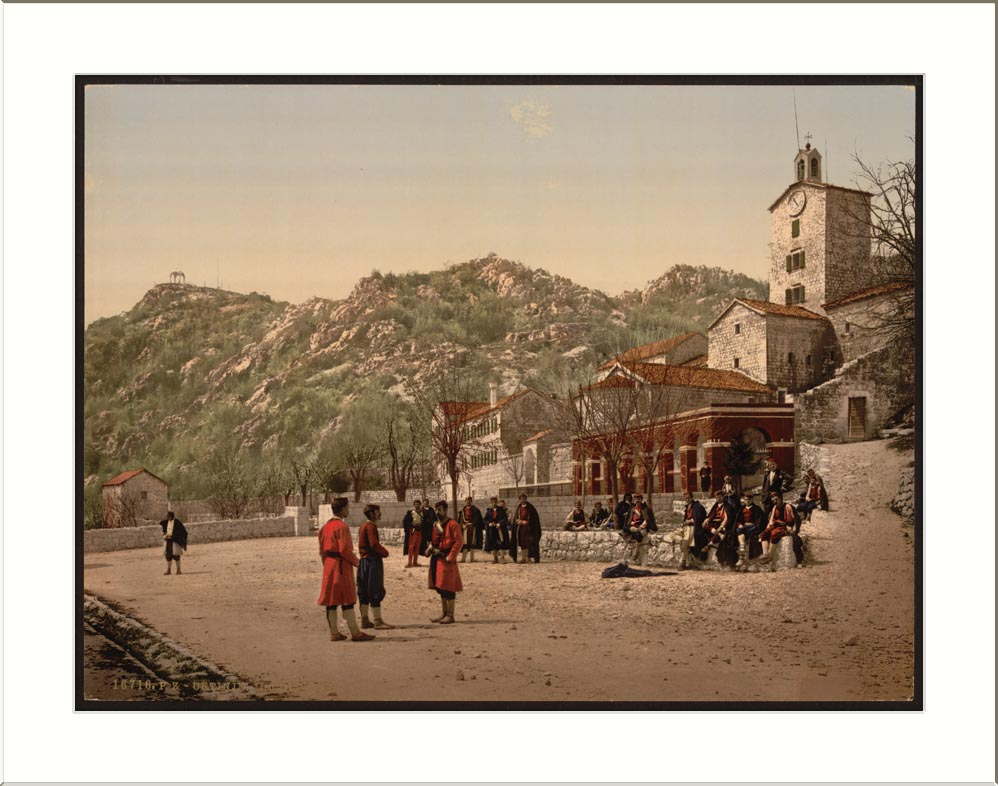
Convent, Cetinje in 1889.
