= Valentina Pavličić =

Montenegrin judge

- Валентина Павличић

President of the Supreme Court of Montenegro
- Incumbent
- Assumed office 3 December 2024
- Preceded by: Vesna Medenica; Vesna Vučković (acting)

Personal details
- Born: 1 April 1968 (age 58) Podgorica, Socialist Republic of Montenegro, Yugoslavia
- Education: University of Montenegro

Valentina Pavličić (Montenegrin: Валентина Павличић; born 1968) is a Montenegrin judge. She has been president of the Supreme Court of Montenegro since 2024 and member of the Venice Commission since 2026.

== Early life and education ==
Pavličić was born on 1 April 1968 in Podgorica, Socialist Republic of Montenegro, then Yugoslavia. She got a degree in law from the University of Montenegro in 1990 and passed the bar exam in Belgrade in 1997.

== Career ==
She has spent much of her professional career at the High Court in Podgorica as a criminal judge. Between 2008 and 2015, Pavličić served as a judge on the Special Chamber for Organised Crime, Corruption, Terrorism and War Crimes at the High Court in Podgorica, and between 2013 and 2015 she presided over the Criminal Chamber of the same court.

In September 2015, she was appointed Montenegro’s representative to the European Court of Human Rights (ECHR), a post she held until February 2024. During that period, she represented the Montenegrin State in proceedings before the Strasbourg Court and played an active role in various bodies of the Council of Europe, such as the Steering Committee on Human Rights (CDDH) and the Committee of Experts on the European Convention on Human Rights System (DH-SYSC). She also served as an expert with the OSCE, the European Commission for the Efficiency of Justice (CEPEJ) and the joint Council of Europe–European Union programme, the Horizontal Facility for the Western Balkans and Turkey.

On 19 November 2024, the judges at the general session of the Supreme Court of Montenegro nominated her to become its new president. Ten days later, on 29 November 2024 the Judicial Council of Montenegro elected her unanimously the new president of the Supreme Court of Montenegro to fill a post that was vacant since December 2020 after the resignation of Vesna Medenica and which Vesna Vučković filled on an acting basis since September 2021. She was sworn in on 3 December 2024.

She is also a member of the Judicial Council and chairs or sits on various bodies involved in the evaluation of judges, witness protection, the fight against corruption, judicial reform and the strengthening of the rule of law. She also leads projects aimed at modernising the judicial system, including the incorporation of artificial intelligence tools to improve judicial practice.

Alongside her judicial and institutional work, Pavličić has been highly active in the academic sphere. She is the author and editor of numerous publications on human rights, the case law of the European Court of Human Rights, criminal policy, the fight against corruption and judicial reform, and she also delivers lectures and runs courses for judges, prosecutors and other legal professionals both in Montenegro and internationally.

On 20 June 2026 Pavličić began her term as member of the Venice Commission.

== Personal life ==
Pavličić speaks English and Italian fluently.
