= Orlov krš =

Mountain in Cetinje, Montenegro

- Serbian Cyrillic: Орлов крш
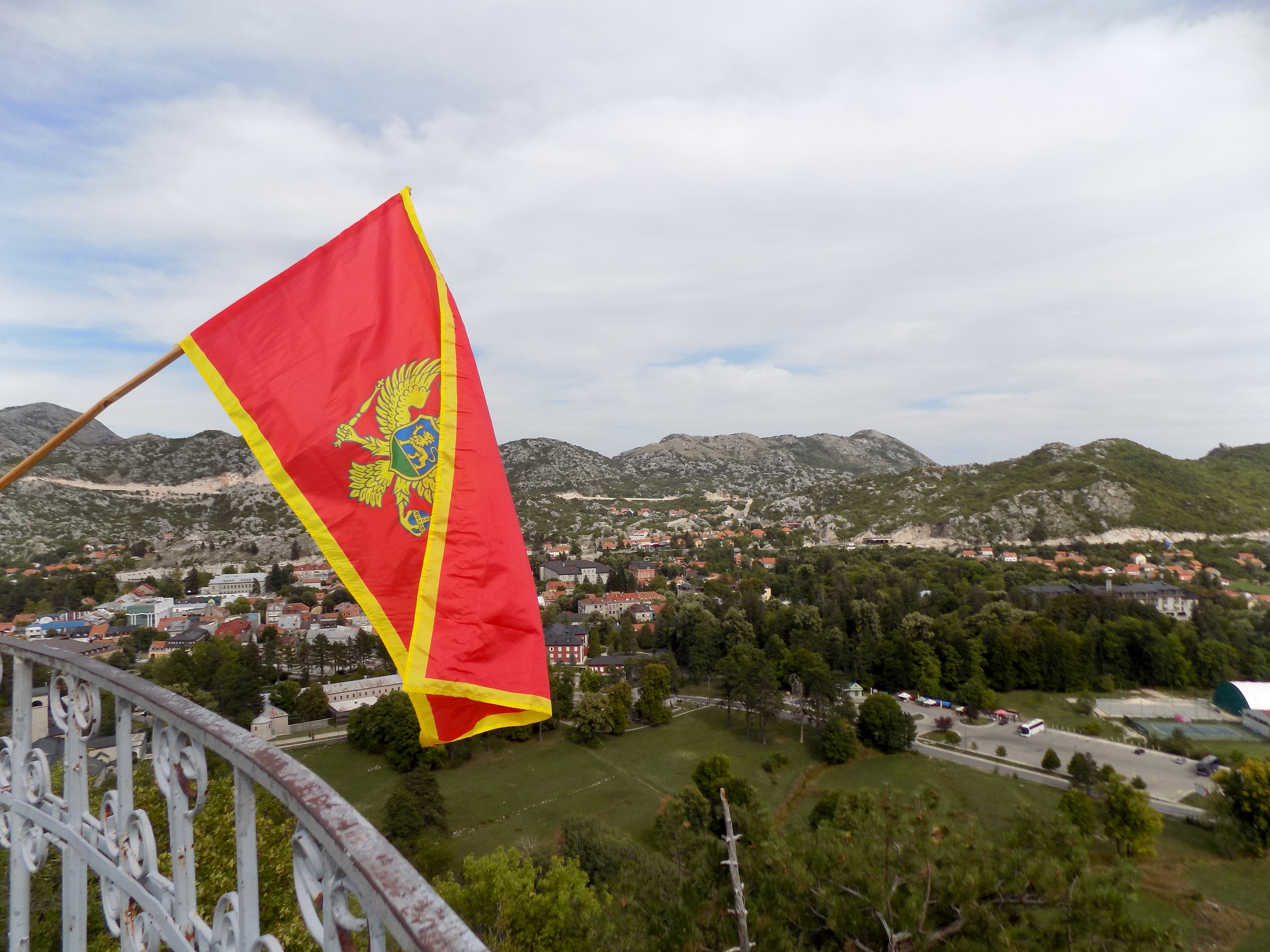

Highest point
- Elevation: 711 m (2,333 ft)
- Coordinates: 42°23′10″N 18°55′9″E

Geography
- Location within Montenegro
- Location: Cetinje, Montenegro
- Parent range: Dinaric Alps

Orlov krš (Serbian Cyrillic: Орлов крш, meaning Eagle's Rock in English) is a mountain in Cetinje, Montenegro.

Orlov krš is the location of the mausoleum of Danilo I, Metropolitan of Cetinje. On 12 August, 2022, a spree shooting occurred, and the perpetrator fled into the mountain to evade police and was shot and killed by a local citizen.
