= Supreme Court of Montenegro =

Highest court in the country

- Vrhovni sud Crne Gore; Врховни суд Црне Горе
- Interactive map of Supreme Court of Montenegro
- 42.4400°N 19.2612°E
- Established: 1 June 1945 (81 years ago)
- Location: Njegoševa 10; Podgorica, Montenegro
- Coordinates: 42.4400°N 19.2612°E

President
- Currently: Valentina Pavličić
- Since: 29 November 2024

External image
- View of building exterior

The Supreme Court of Montenegro (Montenegrin: Vrhovni sud Crne Gore / Врховни суд Црне Горе) is the highest court of Montenegro.

== Background ==
It was established on 1 June 1945. Valentina Pavličić is president of the court since 2024.

Vesna Medenica, a former president of the court, stated that procedures at the court take an average of 50 days.

== See also ==
- Constitutional Court of Montenegro
