= 1992 Montenegrin Championship =

The 1992 Montenegrin football championship season was the unofficial football competition in Montenegro, during the period of FR Yugoslavia. Championship was organised by clubs who supported the independence of Montenegro, but the results of league and final ranking were not recognised by Montenegrin Football Association.

Championship was played in the period June - August, and November - December in 1992. FK Cetinje became the first and only champion of the Montenegrin football championship. They were the only professional team which participated in the competition.

== Members ==
In the Montenegrin football championship participated 10 clubs from municipalities of Cetinje, Kotor and Nikšić.

- FK Cetinje - Cetinje
- FK Crnogorac - Kotor
- Nikšić - Nikšić
- FK Obod - Cetinje
- FK Jadran - Kotor
- FK Belveder - Cetinje
- FK Sloga - Bajice
- FK Crnogorac - Cetinje
- FK Borac - Njeguši
- FK Sloboda - Cetinje

== Stadiums ==
The competition was held at several makeshift fields in Cetinje, near the Kotor, and in Njeguši. Final matches were played at Stadion Obilića Poljana in Cetinje.

== Conditions ==
Due to the tense political situation in Montenegro, the championship was played without media attention. Then the only newspaper in the state has not published any articles about the competition. A lot of games have been played in secret. The last final match were played among 2,000 spectators, but broader, national public was not informed about that who is a champion.

== First round ==
First matches (22–28 June 1992)

Home team	Score	Away team
Cetinje	9 – 0	Sloboda Cetinje
Nikšić	4 – 3	Jadran Kotor
Crnogorac Cetinje	1 – 3	Sloga Bajice
Obod Cetinje	2 – 5	Crnogorac Kotor
Borac Njeguši	4 – 1	Belveder Cetinje

Second matches (9–20 July 1992)

Home team	Score	Away team
Sloboda Cetinje	0 – 11 (agg. 0:20)	Cetinje
Jadran Kotor	3 – 0 (agg. 6:4)	Nikšić
Sloga Bajice	2 – 2 (agg. 5:3)	Crnogorac Cetinje
Crnogorac Kotor	8 – 1 (agg. 13:3)	Obod Cetinje
Belveder Cetinje	3 – 2 (agg. 4:6)	Borac Njeguši

== Main phase ==
First leg (25 July 1992)

Home team	Score	Away team
Cetinje	4 – 0	Borac Njeguši
Crnogorac Kotor	3 – 3	Sloga Bajice

Second leg (1–3 August 1992)

Home team	Score	Away team
Jadran Kotor	1 – 3	Cetinje
Borac Njeguši	0 – 6	Crnogorac Kotor

Third leg (11–12 August 1992)

Home team	Score	Away team
Sloga Bajice	2 – 0	Jadran Kotor
Cetinje	2 – 1	Crnogorac Kotor

Fourth leg (19 August 1992)

Home team	Score	Away team
Borac Njeguši	4 – 6	Sloga Bajice
Crnogorac Kotor	1 – 0	Jadran Kotor

Fifth leg (28 August 1992)

Home team	Score	Away team
Sloga Bajice	2 – 2	Cetinje
Jadran Kotor	3 – 2	Borac Njeguši

Table

1. Cetinje 4 3 1 0 11:4 7

2. Sloga Bajice 4 2 2 0 13:9 6

3. Crnogorac Kotor 4 2 1 1 11:5 5

4. Jadran Kotor 4 1 0 3 4:8 2

5. Borac Njeguši 4 0 0 4 6:18 0

== Semifinals ==
First leg (11–14 November 1992)

Home team	Score	Away team
Jadran Kotor	1 – 5	Cetinje
Crnogorac Kotor	2 – 0	Sloga Bajice

Second leg (18–19 November 1992)

Home team	Score	Away team
Cetinje	2 – 0 (agg. 7:1)	Jadran Kotor
Sloga Bajice	3 – 4 (agg. 3:6)	Crnogorac Kotor

== Finals ==
(1–8 December 1992)

Home team	Score	Away team
Crnogorac Kotor	2 – 2	Cetinje

Home team	Score	Away team
Cetinje	4 – 1 (agg. 6:3)	Crnogorac Kotor

Champion: FK Cetinje
