= Constitutional Court of Montenegro =

Constitutional Court of the Republic of Montenegro Ustavni sud Republike Crne Gore
- Established: 1963
- Jurisdiction: Montenegro
- Location: Podgorica
- Authorised by: Constitution of Montenegro
- Judge term length: nine years
- Website: www.ustavnisud.me

The Constitutional Court of Montenegro (Note: Montenegrin: Уставни суд Црне Горе, romanized: Ustavni sud Crne Gore, Serbian: Уставни суд Црне Горе, romanized: Ustavni sud Crne Gore, Bosnian: Ustavni sud Crne Gore, Croatian: Ustavni sud Crne Gore, Albanian: Gjykata Kushtetuese e Mali i Zi) is a special court authorized to act as the interpreter and guardian of the Constitution of Montenegro. It rules on whether the laws, decrees or other bills enacted by the Montenegrin authorities are in conformity with the constitutional order and provides protection of human rights and freedoms of citizens that are guaranteed by the Constitution.

The court was originally established as a subnational constitutional court of the Socialist Republic of Montenegro within the Socialist Federal Republic of Yugoslavia, at a time when other constituent republics were creating their own constitutional courts. Over the years, it operated within several evolving legal frameworks shaped by the dissolution of Yugoslavia and the formation of the Federal Republic of Yugoslavia (later Serbia and Montenegro), during which it continued to function as the constitutional court of the Republic of Montenegro.

Following 2006 Montenegrin independence referendum, the court assumed the role of the highest constitutional authority in the newly sovereign state. Its mandate and functioning were subsequently redefined by the Constitution of Montenegro adopted in 2007.

== History ==
=== 1963-2007 ===
The Constitutional Court of the Socialist Republic of Montenegro was established by the Constitution of Socialist Republic of Montenegro and corresponding law adopted in 1963. In 1968 Constitutional Court of Yugoslavia delegated Serbian Orthodox Church complaint about the destruction of the Njegoš's Testament Church to the Constitutional Court of Montenegro for final decision.

New subnational constitutional courts operated along the federal level Constitutional Court of Yugoslavia. State Union of Serbia and Montenegro signed the European Convention on Human Rights on 3 April 2003 and it was ratified on 4 May 2004 with application of the convention in court's rulings applying from that point onwards. Montenegro declared independence in 2006 and the role of the court in the new legal framework was redefined with the introduction of 2007 constitution.

== See also ==
- Supreme Court of Montenegro
