= 2022 Cetinje shooting =

Spree shooting in Cetinje, Montenegro

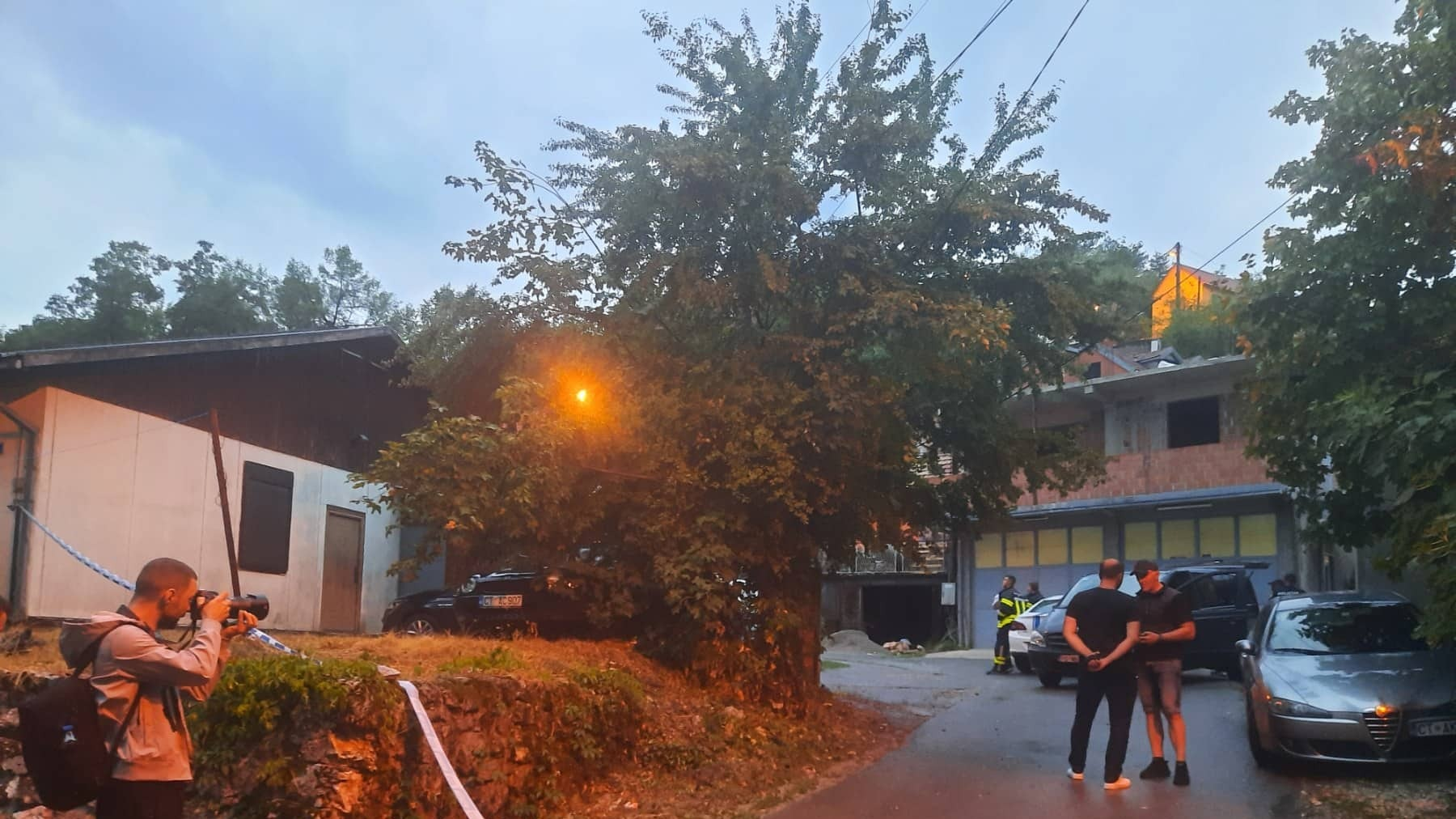
- Police and journalists at the scene of the shooting in Cetinje
- Location: 42°23′19″N 18°55′19″E; Cetinje, Montenegro
- Date: 12 August 2022 c. 03:30 p.m. – 04:15 p.m. (UTC+02:00)
- Target: Civilians
- Attack type: Home invasion; mass murder; shootout; mass shooting
- Weapon: Semi-automatic hunting carbine
- Deaths: 11 (including the perpetrator)
- Injuries: 6
- Perpetrator: Vučko Borilović
- Motive: Unknown

On 12 August 2022, a spree shooting occurred in Cetinje, Montenegro. Ten people were killed, including two children, and six others were wounded. The gunman, identified as 33-year-old Vučko Borilović, was shot and killed after engaging in a gun battle with police officers.

== Shooting ==
At about 3:30 p.m. on 12 August 2022, Borilović entered his home in the Medovina neighbourhood of Cetinje, where he engaged in an argument with the family that were sub-tenants. He fatally shot three family members, including two children, with a hunting carbine. Borilović proceeded to call their father, who was not present at the time, to inform him that he had killed his wife and children.

At the time of the shooting, the on-call service of the Cetinje Security Department was informed of gunfire. Borilović then went outside and randomly shot civilians on the street. He next entered a neighbouring house, where he killed two senior citizens and injured their 32-year-old grandson. At the threshold of their house, he killed the senior citizens' son. Borilović then killed his own uncle and three more neighbours.

After police officers arrived, Borilović refused to surrender and shot at them, injuring one. He also fired at an ambulance to prevent its staff from treating the victims. At around 3:50 pm, Borilović stopped shooting and took a phone call, in which he said that he "probably won't survive". He then ran towards the Orlov krš mountain and police began shooting at him. Borilović refused an entreaty to surrender. Police fired around twenty bullets at Borilović, and he was hit by at least five, according to the autopsy report. A number of streets around the location of the shooting were closed, while the police presence was increased.

== Victims ==
Eleven people were killed during the attack, including the perpetrator. An 8-year-old and an 11-year-old were killed in Borilović's home, while their mother died from her wounds in a local hospital. The other seven victims were people shot in the street, while an additional six people were wounded. Two of the wounded victims were sent to a hospital in Cetinje to be treated for their injures. The other four suffered from life-threatening injuries and were sent to the Podgorica Clinical Centre. Three patients underwent emergency surgery and were later reported to be in an intensive care unit; one patient with a head injury, another with a liver injury, while the third had head and neck injuries and an open fracture of the upper right arm. As of 15 August, one of the three wounded persons was still in intensive care at the Clinical Centre with life-threatening wounds.

== Investigation ==
The authorities did not disclose the details and motives that led Borilović to commit the shooting. According to Borilović's cousin, a motive for the shooting was unpaid rent, although this does not explain why he began shooting randomly at others in the area after targeting the sub-tenants in his home.

Nenad Kaluđerović, a local man, was believed by some to have shot Borilović dead during a shootout between Borilović and police. Although local media repeated that Kaluđerović was the shooter, the High State Prosecutor's Office in Podgorica (HSPO) had yet to determine whose bullet killed Borilović. Kaluđerović was on the run until 14 August when he showed up at HSPO to give his statement on the event. The police confiscated his gun used in the shootout. It was later confirmed that Borilović was killed by police, and not by Kaluđerović.

On 15 August, interior minister Filip Adžić stated that the Ministry of Internal Affairs would form a special commission that would investigate in detail actions taken by the Cetinje Police during the shooting event due to a lot of misinformation that has appeared in the public. On the same day, it was reported that 4,200 euros and eight bullets for a hunting rifle were found during the police search of Borilović's house.

== Perpetrator ==
Vučko Borilović (Montenegrin: Вучко Бориловић), also known as Vuk Burilović, was identified as the perpetrator. He had worked in the Lovćen National Park for five years up to his death, and previously as the head of the environmental hygiene service.

Born on 21 November 1988 in Cetinje, he finished elementary school in his hometown, and high school in Belgrade, Serbia. Borilović was a member of the local council of Social Democrats (SD) political party. He was married and had three children.

Borilović was a recreational hunter who had a gun licence for the hunting carbine that he used during the shooting. He had no criminal record prior to the shooting. Borilović did receive prior treatment at a psychiatric hospital in Kotor. He was scheduled to undergo a physical examination at the Kotor Psychiatric Hospital on the day of shooting. Prior to that, fifteen days before the event, he attacked a neighbour.

== Aftermath ==
Due to the declaration of a day of mourning, football matches of the First and Second Leagues of Montenegro, as well as other sports events, were cancelled. The basketball game held in Belgrade on 13 August, between Serbia and Montenegro started with a moment of silence for the victims of the shooting.

On 13 August, prosecutor Andrijana Nastić confirmed Kaluđerović's identity; he was, at the time, believed to have fired the shot that killed Borilović. Following the announcement of his identity, people started celebrating him as a hero. Kaluđerović was godfather to one of Borilović's victims.

Kaluđerović has his own history of legal issues. At first, he was suspected of the murder of Željko Jovanović on 13 August 2006. After more than two years on the run, Kaluđerović gave himself up to the authorities of Montenegro in November 2008. In October 2010, the High Court in Podgorica sentenced him to 10 years in prison for the murder of Jovanović. Seven months later, the Appellate Court of Montenegro returned the case to the first-instance court for a retrial in front of a different judicial panel. He was then released from custody and acquitted of murdering Jovanović in October 2012.

Kaluđerović was also arrested in September 2021 on a terrorism charge. He was one of a group that tried to prevent the enthronement of Metropolitan Joanikije II of Montenegro.

A commemorative session of the Municipal Parliament of the Old Royal Capital Cetinje was held on 14 August at the Cetinje Royal Palace. On the same day, all ten victims were buried in Cetinje. On 15 August, the citizens of Cetinje gathered at the Main Town Square to pay tribute to the victims. Afterwards, many citizens headed towards Medovina, where they paid their respects to the murder victims with a minute of silence, after which they returned to the square.

== Reactions ==
President Milo Đukanović and Prime Minister Dritan Abazović both said the shooting "was an unprecedented tragedy". Abazović subsequently declared a three-day mourning period. The mayor of Cetinje, Nikola Đurašković, said he was "deeply shaken by the loss of innocent lives". Zoran Brđanin, the director of the Montenegrin Police, said that "it is not known yet what prompted Borilović to such a heinous act". Patriarch Porfirije and Metropolitan Joanikije II sent their condolences, as well as Crown Prince Nicholas of Montenegro.

Multiple foreign leaders had expressed their condolences too, namely the Member of the Presidency of Bosnia and Herzegovina, Željko Komšić, President of North Macedonia, Stevo Pendarovski, and President of Serbia, Aleksandar Vučić.

In the name of the European Union, vice-president of the European Commission Josep Borrell and MEP Tonino Picula had also expressed condolences.

== See also ==
- List of national days of mourning (2020–present)
- List of rampage killers in Europe
- 2025 Cetinje shootings
