= Montenegrin independent championship (1992–1999) =

Montenegrin independent championship was the unofficial football and futsal competition in Montenegro, during the time period of FR Yugoslavia. Championship was organised by clubs who supported the independence of Montenegro, but the results of league and final ranking were not recognised by Montenegrin Football Association.

Championship was organised from 1992 to 1999. Only at season 1992, it was a football championship. In the next period, Montenegrin independent championship played as fustal league.

== Conditions ==
Due to the tense political situation in Montenegro, the championship was played without media attention, especially from 1992 to 1996. Then the only newspaper in the state has not published any articles about the competition. A lot of games have been played in secret.
In first year, football competition was held at several makeshift fields in Cetinje, near the Kotor, and in Njeguši. Futsal competition from 1993-1999 played in school sports halls and open air fields.

== Champions ==
Season	Teams	Champion	Second	Third
1992 / football	10	FK Cetinje	FK Crnogorac Kotor	FK Sloga Bajice
1993 / futsal	7	FK Cetinje	FK Crnogorac Kotor	FK Sloga Bajice

== See also ==
- 1992 Montenegrin Championship
- 1993 Montenegrin independent championship
