= Order of Njegoš =

Order of Njegoš may refer to:

- Order of Njegoš (Republika Srpska)
- Order of Njegoš (Serbia and Montenegro), one of the orders, decorations, and medals of Serbia and Montenegro
