= Velestovo, Cetinje =

Velestovo Велестово
- Village
- Location within Montenegro
- Country: Montenegro
- Region: Central
- Municipality: Old Royal Capital Cetinje

Population (2011)
  - Total: 17
- Time zone: UTC+1 (CET)
  - Summer (DST): UTC+2 (CEST)

Velestovo (Montenegrin: Велестово) is a small village in the municipality of Cetinje, Montenegro.

== Demographics ==
According to the 2003 census it had 25 inhabitants.

According to the 2011 census, its population was 17.

Ethnicity in 2011
Ethnicity	Number	Percentage
Montenegrins	14	82.4%
other/undeclared	3	17.6%
Total	17	100%
