= Humci =

- Village
- Location within Bosnia and Herzegovina
- Coordinates: 44.6906238°N 18.679816°E
- Country: Bosnia and Herzegovina
- Entity: Federation of Bosnia and Herzegovina
- Canton: Tuzla
- Municipality: Čelić

Area
  - Total: 9.81 sq mi (25.40 km^{2})

Population (2013)
  - Total: 1,817
  - Density: 185.3/sq mi (71.54/km^{2})
- Time zone: UTC+1 (CET)
  - Summer (DST): UTC+2 (CEST)

Humci is a village in the municipality of Čelić, Bosnia and Herzegovina.

== Demographics ==
According to the 2013 census, its population was 1,817.

Ethnicity in 2013
Ethnicity	Number	Percentage
Bosniaks	1,807	99.4%
other/undeclared	10	0.6%
Total	1,817	100%
