= Bajice =

Bajice Бајице
- Village
- Location within Montenegro
- Coordinates: 42.400329°N 18.895444°E
- Country: Montenegro
- Region: Central
- Municipality: Old Royal Capital Cetinje

Population (2011)
  - Total: 781
- Time zone: UTC+1 (CET)
  - Summer (DST): UTC+2 (CEST)

Bajice (Montenegrin Cyrillic: Бајице) is a village in the municipality of Cetinje, Montenegro.

== Demographics ==
According to the 2011 census, its population was 781.

Ethnicity in 2011
Ethnicity	Number	Percentage
Montenegrins	718	91.9%
Serbs	28	3.6%
other/undeclared	35	4.5%
Total	781	100%
