= Njegoš's Testament Church =

- Његошева завјетна црква
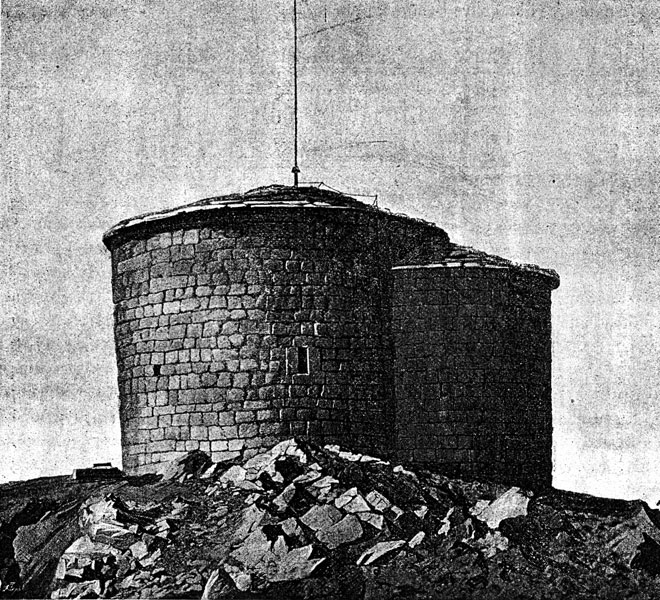
- Njegoš's Testament Church
- Location: Lovćen
- Country: Montenegro
- Denomination: Serbian Orthodox

History
- Dedication: Saint Peter of Cetinje

Administration
- Archdiocese: Metropolitanate of Montenegro and the Littoral

The Njegoš's Testament Church (Serbian: Његошева завјетна црква, Njegoševa zavjetna crkva) was a Serbian Orthodox church at the site of modern-day Mausoleum of Njegoš located on the top of Lovćen, mountain and national park in southwestern Montenegro. It was a chapel dedicated to Saint Peter of Cetinje, built in 1845 according to the wishes of Petar II Petrović-Njegoš, with the desire to be buried there. Njegoš died on October 31, 1851, but was initially buried in the Cetinje Monastery out of fear that the Ottoman forces might desecrate his grave. His remains were later transferred to Lovćen on August 27, 1855. The Russian ethnographer Pavel Rovinsky attended a memorial service for Njegoš. The chapel was finally demolished in 1972 to make way for the construction of the Njegoš Mausoleum, completed in 1974.

== Destruction and removal ==
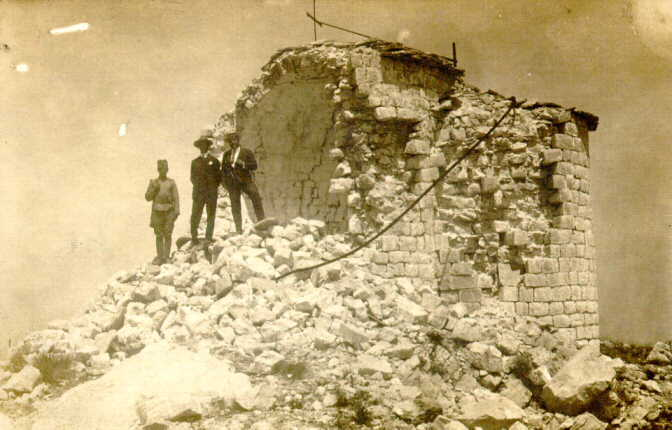
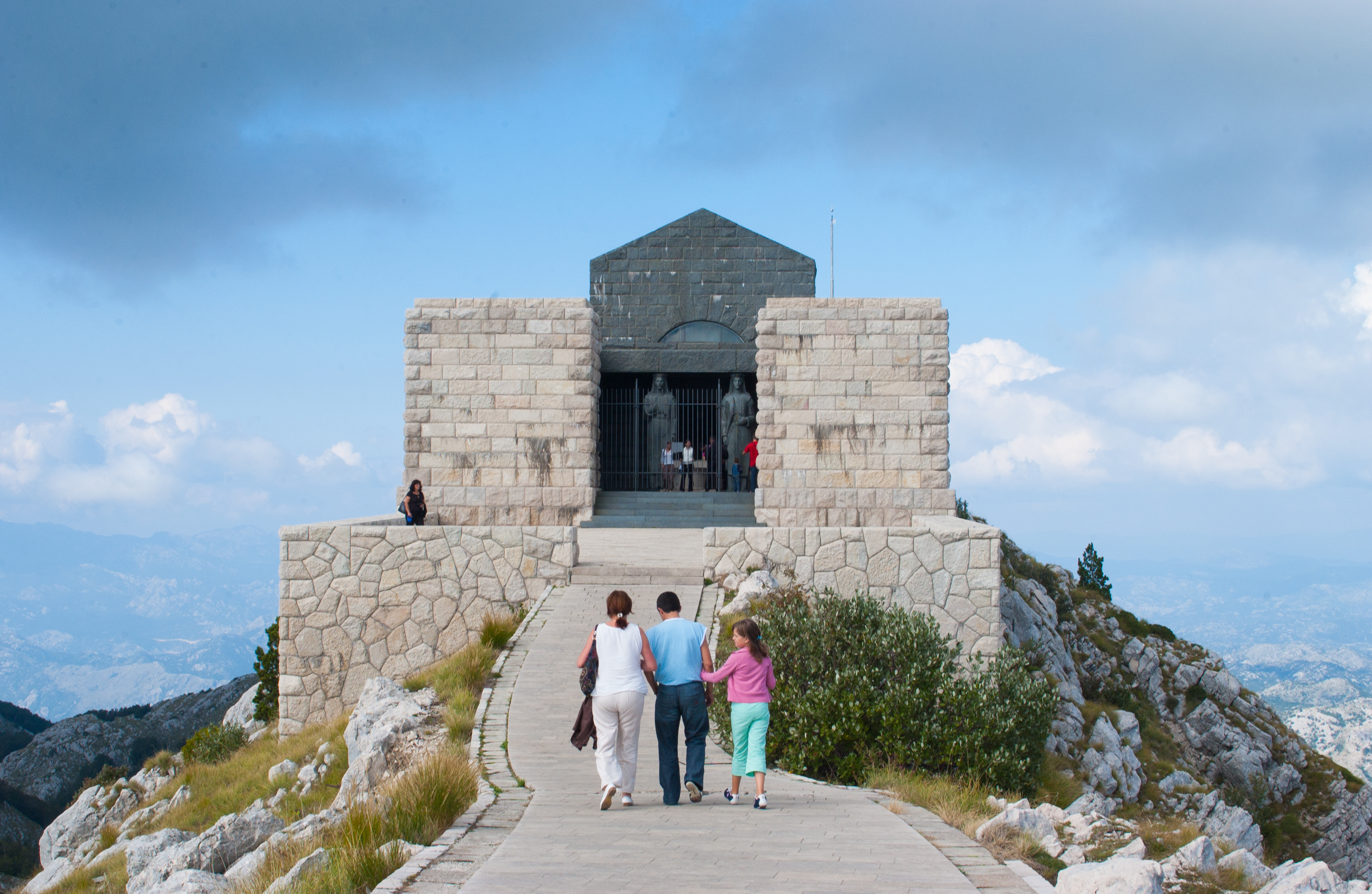
Ruins in 1924, coat of arms of SR Montenegro & Mausoleum of Njegoš

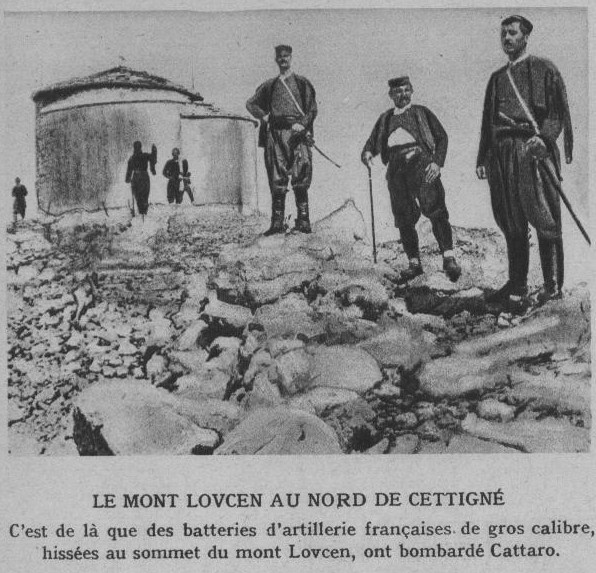
Montenegrin troops outside of the Church, Lovćen, October 1914

The church and Njegoš's grave were repeatedly damaged and restored over the years. The first destruction occurred in 1916 when Austro-Hungarian forces demolished it during Montenegrin campaign of World War I, intending to replace it with a monument to Emperor Franz Joseph I of Austria. Njegoš's remains were returned to Cetinje. The church was rebuilt in 1925 with support from King Alexander I of Yugoslavia, and Njegoš's remains were reinterred. The reconstruction maintained the chapel's original structure, and Njegoš's remains were reinterred there in a grand ceremony. It was later damaged by Italian forces in 1942.

The silhouette of Njegoš's Church was featured as part of the coat of arms of Socialist Republic of Montenegro, constituent republic of SFR Yugoslavia. In 1952 authorities of the Socialist Republic of Montenegro proposed to replace the church with a representative mausoleum. In 1968, the Cetinje Municipal Assembly unanimously decided to build the mausoleum on Lovćen, leading to the eventual demolition of Njegoš's chapel. The Serbian Orthodox Church filed a complaint to the Constitutional Court of Yugoslavia contesting the government's decision to demolish the chapel. The church claimed the chapel was a significant religious and cultural site and argued for its recognition as a sacred space rather than merely a cultural monument. The Yugoslav Constitutional Court addressed the church's complaint but declared that it was not competent to decide on the matter relegating it to the Constitutional Court of Montenegro. Montenegrin court ruled in favour of the local government in Monenegro. Ruins of the church were removed in 1972 to make way for the construction of a new marble mausoleum, designed by sculptor Ivan Meštrović, which was completed in 1974. The original stones from the church were moved to Ivanova Korita. Despite appeals from the Montenegrin Metropolitanate to restore the votive church, it has not been rebuilt, and Njegoš's resting place remains the mausoleum. However, new churches dedicated to Njegoš have been built in various locations across Montenegro, Republika Srpska in Bosnia and Herzegovina and in Serbia.

== See also ==
- Metropolitanate of Montenegro and the Littoral
