= Njegoševo =

Njegoševo Његошево (Serbian)
- Village (Selo)
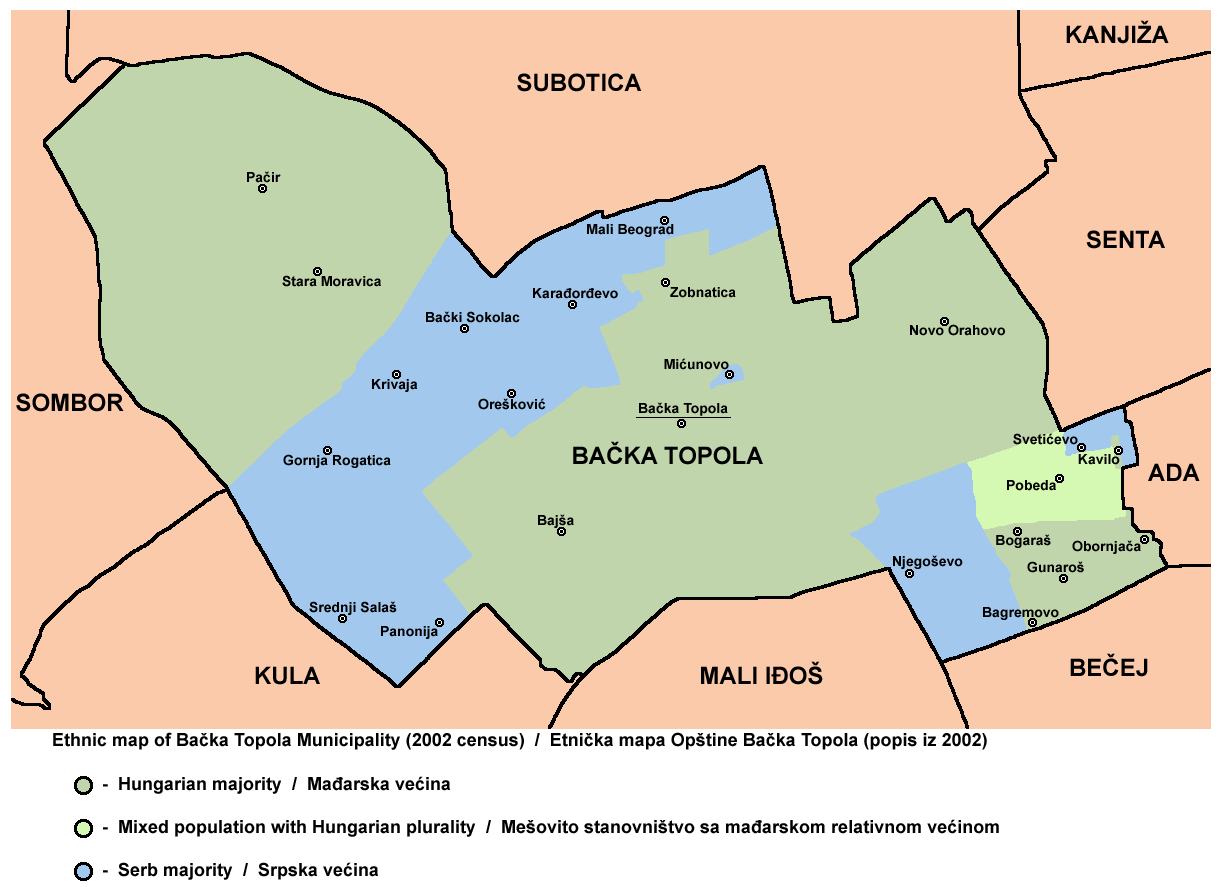
- Map of the Bačka Topola municipality showing the location of Njegoševo

- Location within Vojvodina Location within Serbia Location within Europe
- Coordinates: 45°46′N 19°45′E
- Country: Serbia
- Province: Vojvodina
- District: North Bačka District
- Municipality: Bačka Topola

Population (2002)
  - Total: 632
- Time zone: UTC+1 (CET)
  - Summer (DST): UTC+2 (CEST)

Njegoševo (Serbian Cyrillic: Његошево) is a village in Serbia. It is situated in the Bačka Topola municipality, in the North Bačka District, Vojvodina province. The village has a Serb ethnic majority and its population numbering 632 people (2002 census).

== Name ==
In Serbian the village is known as Njegoševo (Његошево), in Hungarian as Istenáldás, and in Croatian as Njegoševo.

== Historical population ==
- 1961: 1,090
- 1971: 923
- 1981: 752
- 1991: 635
- 2002: 632

== See also ==
- List of places in Serbia
- List of cities, towns and villages in Vojvodina
