= Mausoleum of Njegoš =

Mausoleum of Petar II Petrović-Njegoš in Montenegro

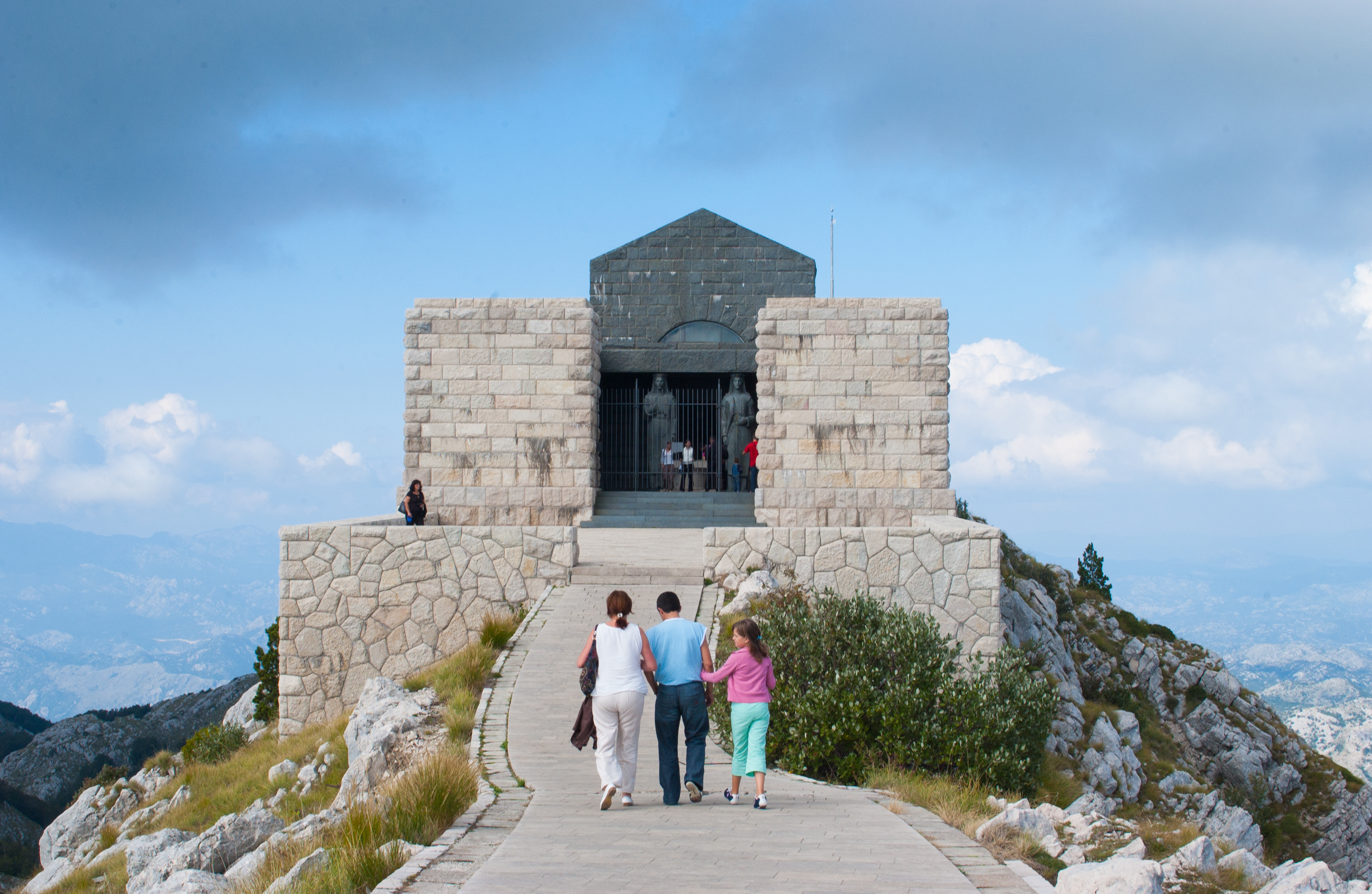

- Location of the mausoleum
- 42°23′57″N 18°49′06″E
- Location: Mount Lovćen, Montenegro

History
- Built: 1974
- Built for: Interring Petar II Petrović-Njegoš

Site notes
- Architect: Ivan Meštrović

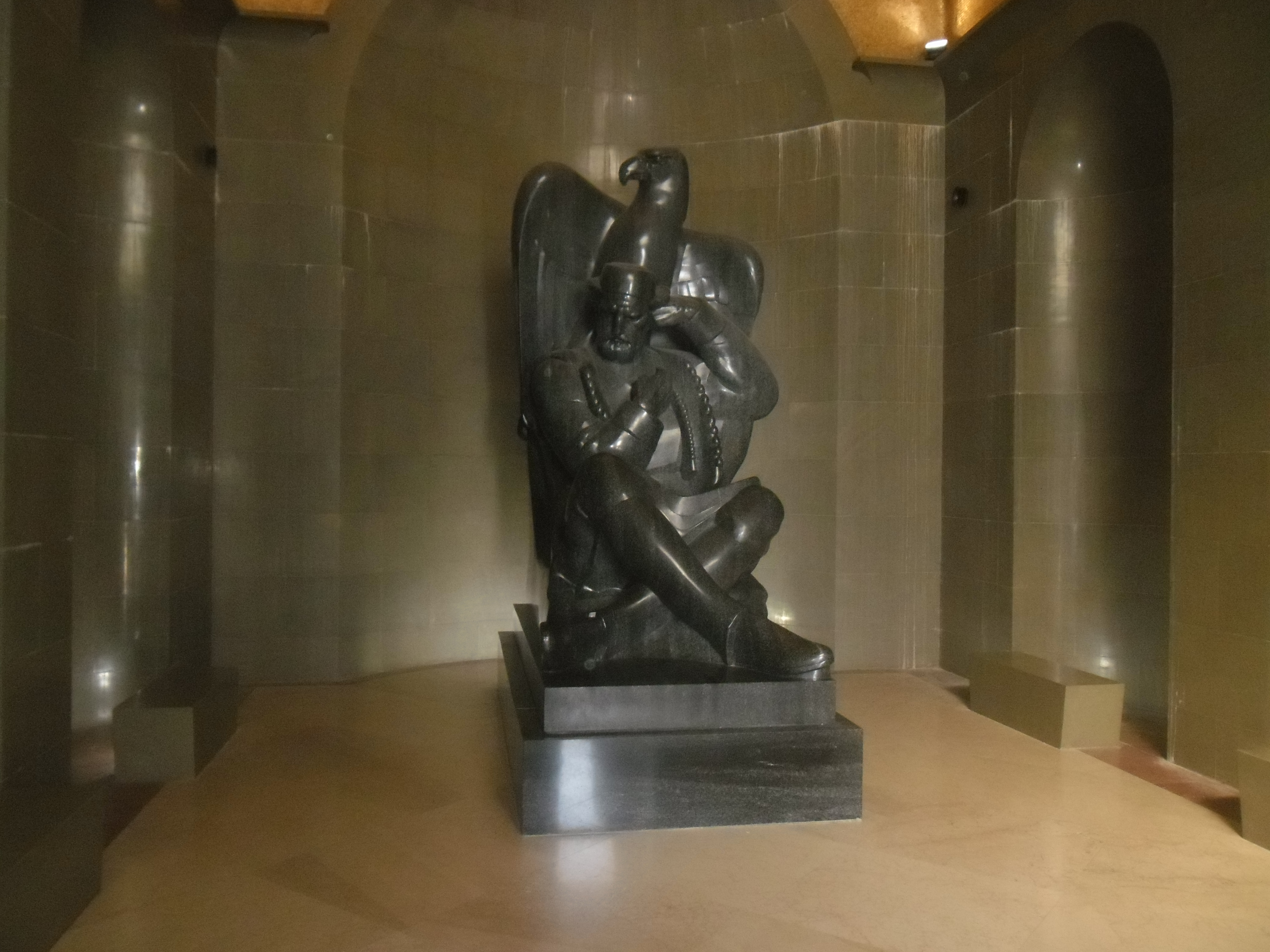
Monument to Petar II Petrović Njegoš in the mausoleum

The Mausoleum of Njegoš is a mausoleum interring Petar II Petrović-Njegoš located on the top of Jezerski Vrh Peak on Mount Lovćen.

The mausoleum is located twenty-one kilometres via asphalt road from near-by Cetinje and it was built on the idea of Croatian sculptor Ivan Meštrović. It was built on the same location of the Njegoš Testament Church which Njegoš had built in 1845 with the intention of being buried there and which he dedicated to his predecessor Petar I Petrović-Njegoš (who is canonized as Saint Peter of Cetinje in the Serbian Orthodox Church).

The church suffered damage from bombardment in both World Wars. In 1974, despite protest from the Metropolitanate of Montenegro and the Littoral and local Orthodox Christians, the old church was ordered demolished by a commission of the League of Communists of Montenegro led by Veljko Milatović and today's mausoleum was built.

== History ==
Prior to his death, Njegoš had asked to be buried atop Mount Lovćen, in a chapel dedicated to his predecessor Petar I Petrović-Njegoš. He had designed the chapel himself, and oversaw its construction in 1845. Following his death in October 1851, Njegoš was interred at the Cetinje Monastery. His remains were transferred to Mount Lovćen in 1855. They remained there until 1916, when during the First World War, Montenegro was occupied by Austria-Hungary and the Habsburg occupiers decided to erect a monument to Austrian Emperor Franz Joseph on Mount Lovćen. Not wishing for a monument to the Austrian Emperor to be located on the same perch as a symbol of South Slavic national feeling, Austro-Hungarian authorities demanded that Njegoš's remains be moved back to Cetinje. The Montenegrins had little choice in the matter and the remains were removed under the supervision of Serbian Orthodox clergy so that the Austro-Hungarians would not be accused of desecration. By the end of the war, Njegoš's chapel was severely damaged. Local authorities negotiated with the Yugoslav government for years over the question of where, when and at whose expense Njegoš was to be buried. Montenegrin officials favoured restoring the original chapel, while the authorities in Belgrade opened a competition over the designs of a planned mausoleum. Some of the plans differed greatly from the original Byzantinesque building. Due to lack of funds, plans for a mausoleum were discarded by 1925 and the original church building was reconstructed. In September 1925, in the course of a three-day ceremony sponsored and attended by Yugoslavia's King Alexander and Queen Maria, the chapel was rededicated and Njegoš's remains were reburied. Historian Andrew B. Wachtel writes: "The tone of the event, which was described extensively in the Yugoslav press, bordered on a piety more appropriate for the treatment of a saint than a writer."

At the end of the Second World War, Yugoslavia came under communist rule. In 1952, Yugoslavia's communist authorities decided to replace Njegoš's chapel with a secular mausoleum designed by Ivan Meštrović. Wachtel suggests that this was done to "de-Serbianize" Njegoš and eliminate any trace of the chapel's Byzantine design. In the late 1960s the chapel was demolished, and a mausoleum was constructed by 1971. Njegoš's remains were transferred back to Mount Lovćen in 1974, and the mausoleum was officially inaugurated that year.

== Legacy ==
Njegoš and his burial spot used to be mentioned in the popular Montenegrin folk song Oj, svijetla majska zoro which (with revised lyrics) has been the national anthem of Montenegro since 2004.

From 1945 to 1992, the previous Njegoš Testament Church was featured in the coat of arms of the Socialist Republic of Montenegro and from 1992 to 1994 in the coat of arms of the Republic of Montenegro.

== Gallery ==
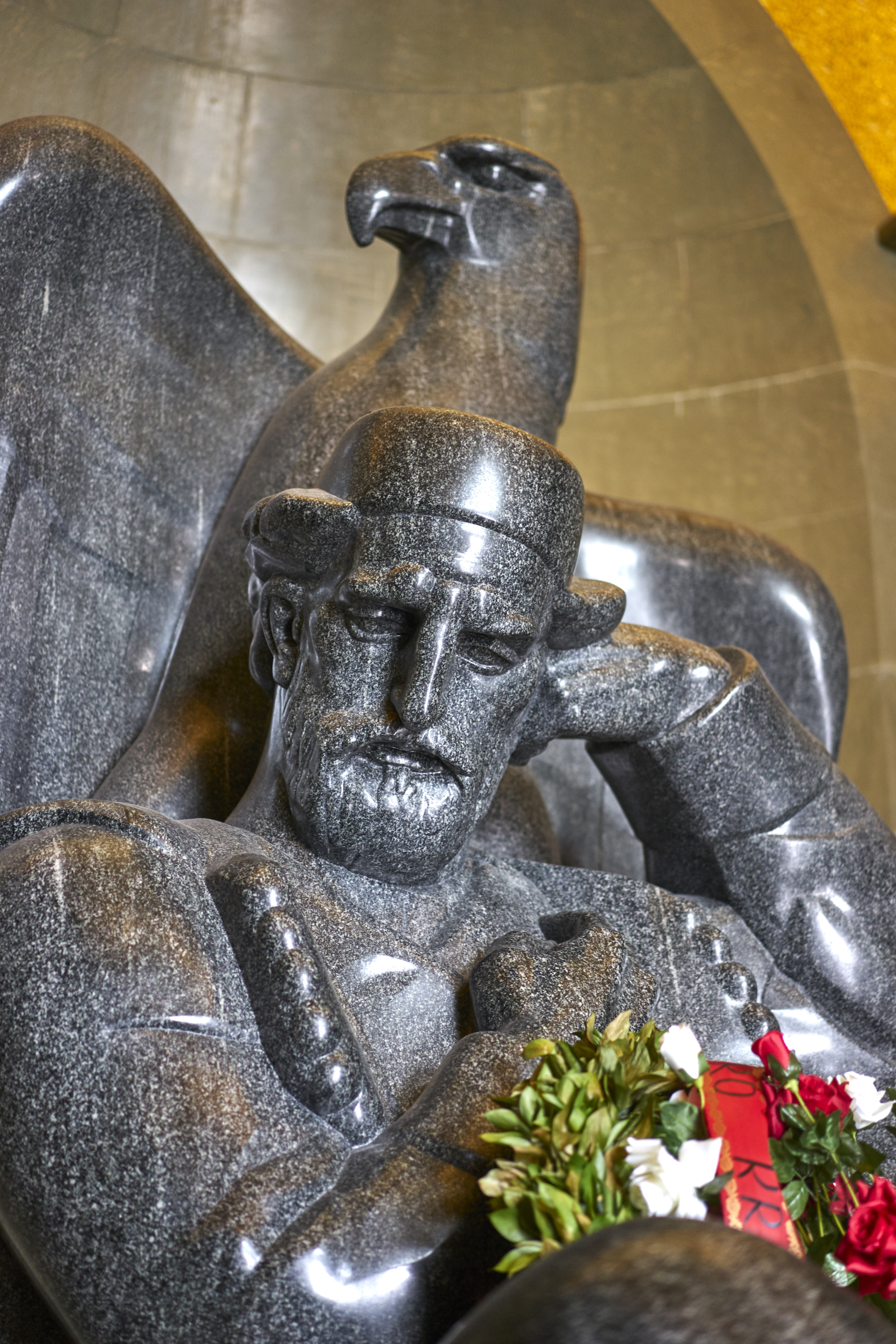
Njegos with an eagle over his head

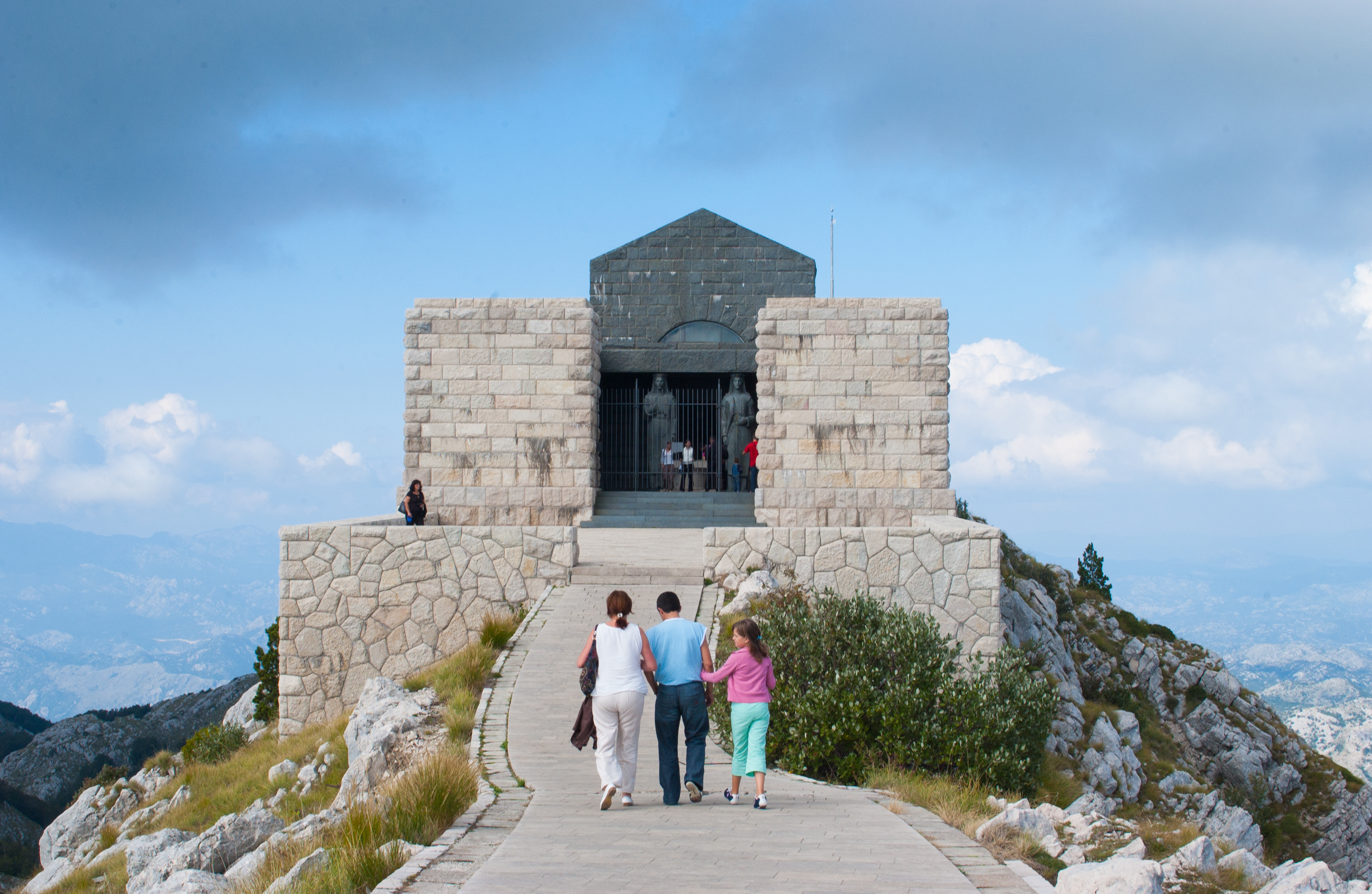
Entrance to the Mausoleum

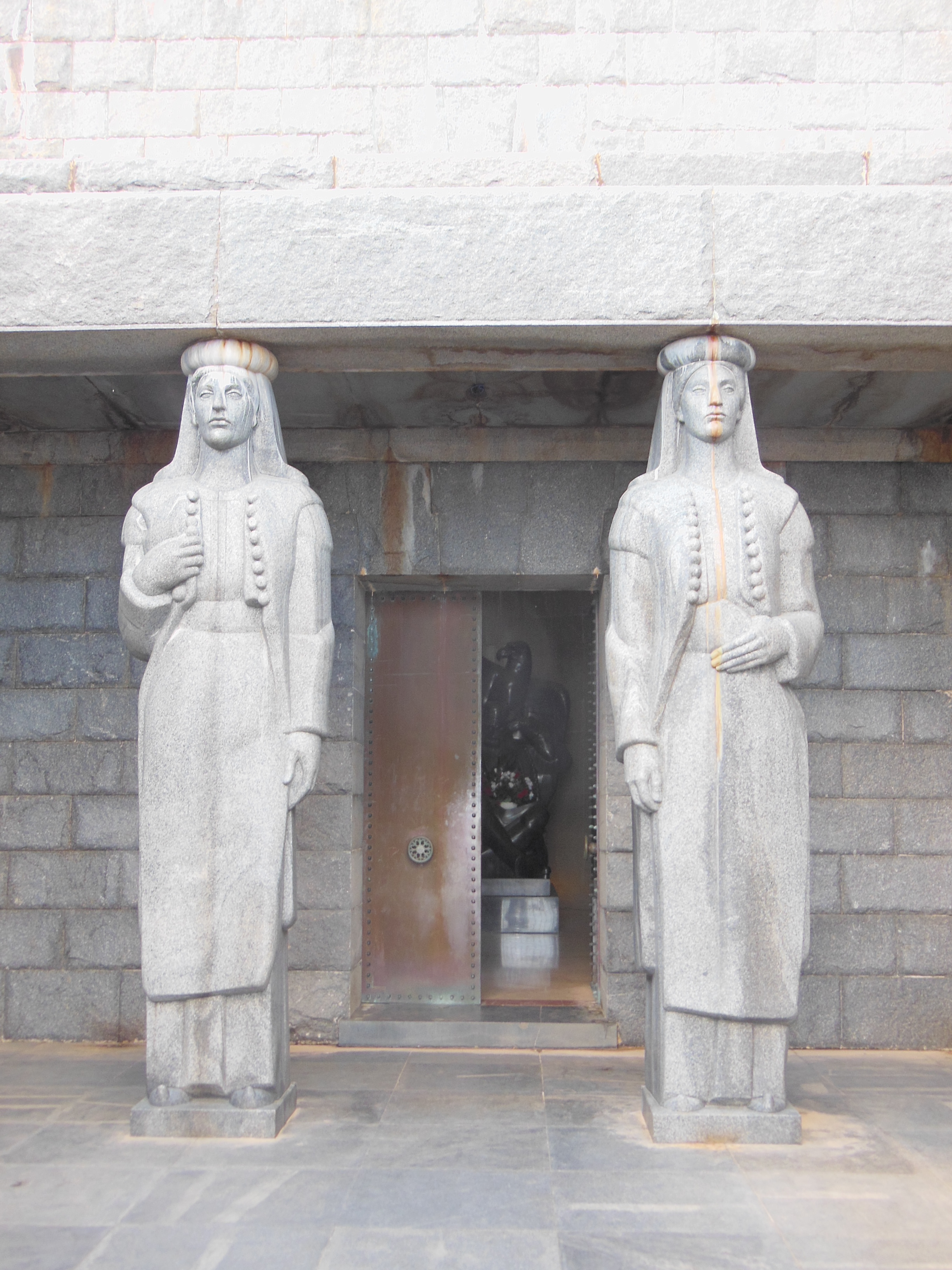
Caryatids at the entrance show Montenegrins

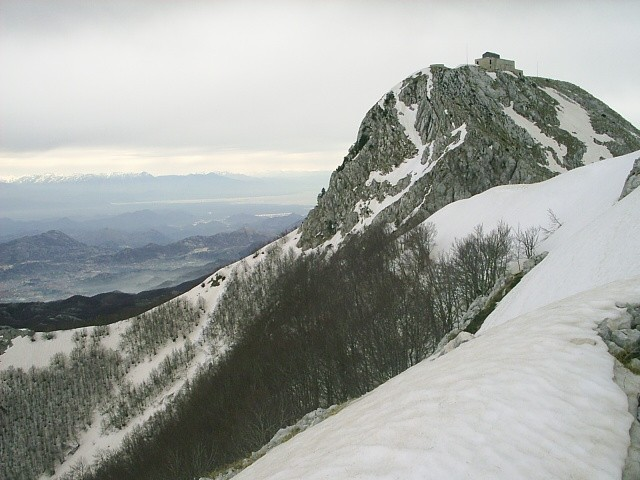
Jezerski vrh

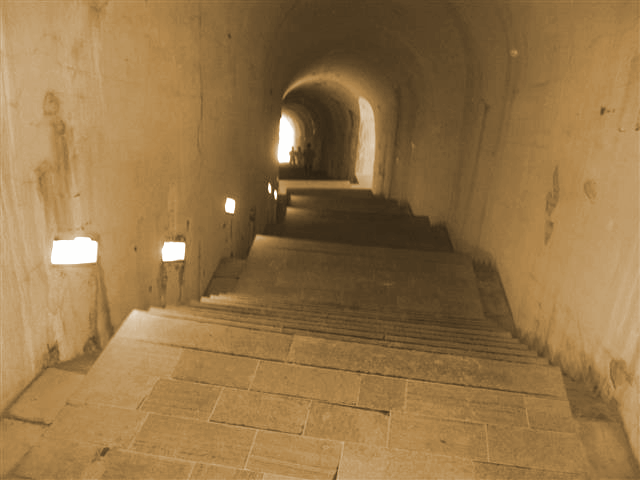
A tunnel that leads to Jezerski vrh

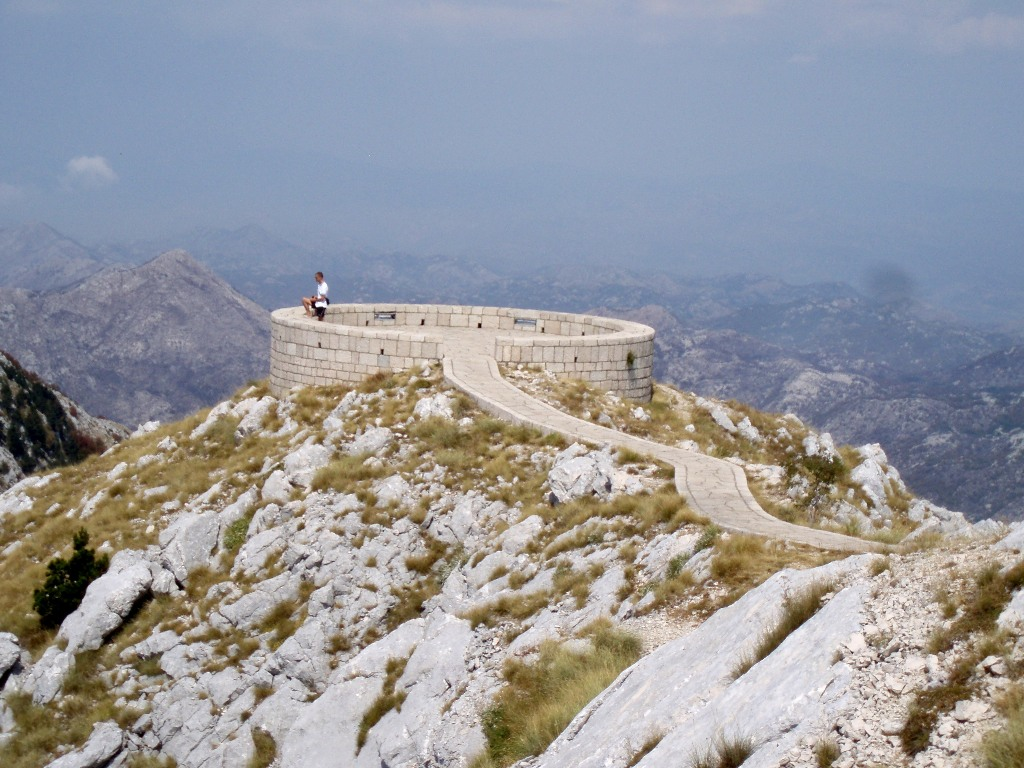
Guvno lookout point with a view of the ″Stone Sea″

== Notes ==
1. Sometimes referred to as the Njegoš Mausoleum.
