= Jastreb =

Jastreb (lit. 'hawk' in Serbo-Croatian) may refer to:

- Jastreb, Montenegro, a village near Danilovgrad
- Jastreb Vuk-T, a Yugoslav glider aircraft
- Mile Dedaković, a Croatian Army officer known by the nom de guerre "Jastreb"
- Soko J-21 Jastreb, a Yugoslav light attack aircraft
- Yugoslav minelayer Jastreb, a Royal Yugoslav Navy ship
