= Kopito =

Kopito may refer to:

- Kopito Ridge, Antarctica
- Kopito (Višegrad), Bosnia and Herzegovina
- Kopito, Danilovgrad, Montenegro
