= Tony Bradan =

Canadian musician (1913–1999)

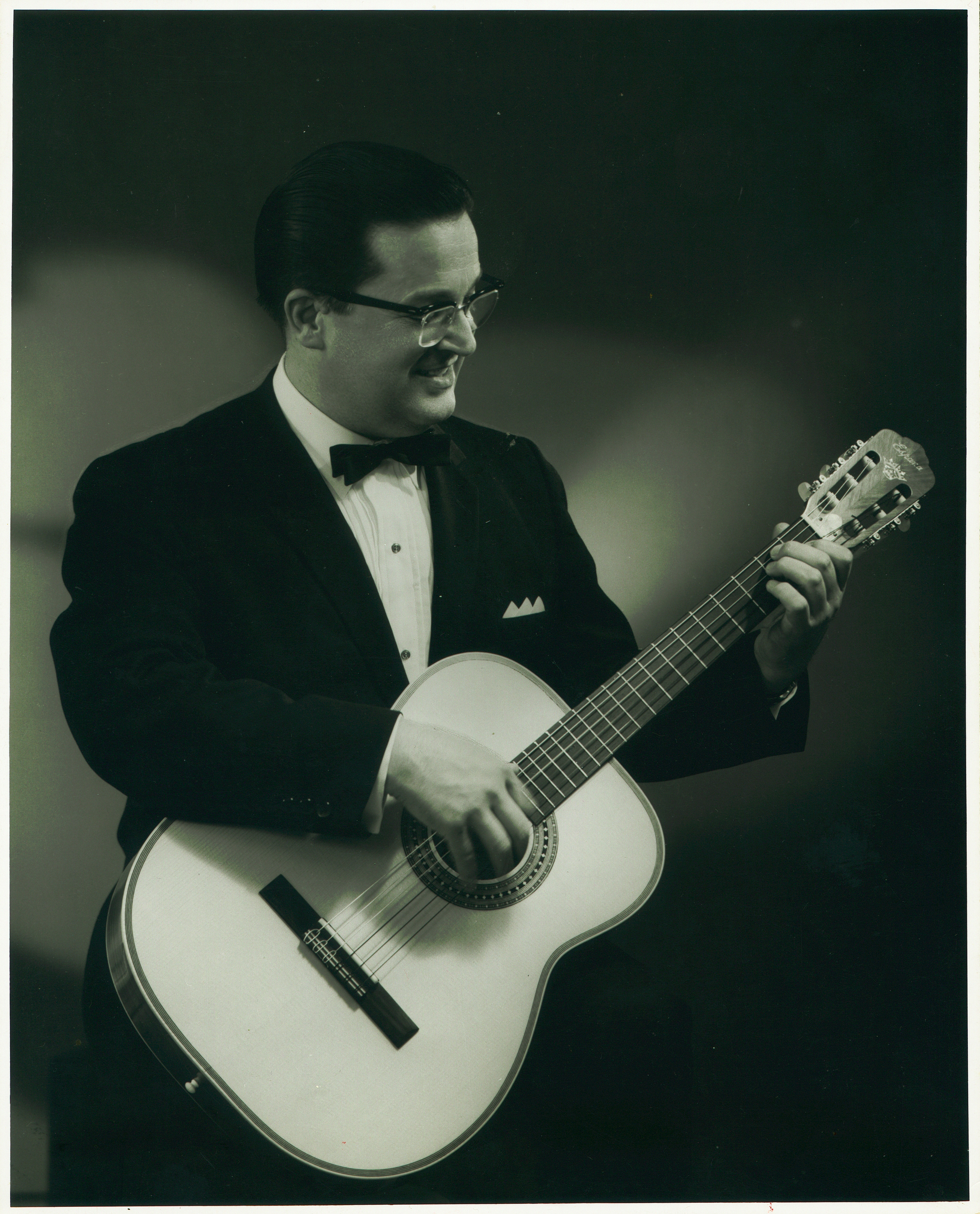
Tony Bradan in 1968

Tony Bradan (born Antonio Alfredo Bradanovich; October 6, 1913 – 23 November 1999) was a Canadian teacher, guitarist, and arranger.

== Early life and career ==
Bradan was born of Balkan descent in Ladner, British Columbia. His father was born in Viš, Principality of Montenegro. His mother, Maria Filomena Bussanich, was born to Italian parents from Lussinpiccolo, Austria-Hungary (now Mali Lošinj, Croatia). He studied guitar with Roy Barry and composition with Pasquale Fiore in Vancouver and harmony with John Weinzweig in Toronto. From 1937 to 1942, he was a member of Mart Kenney's Western Gentlemen. During World War II, he was musical director of the Army Show and arranger for the Canadian orchestra of the Allied Expeditionary Forces. After the war, he played in orchestras for Canadian Broadcasting Corporation Toronto. Bradan married singer Judy Richards.

== Teaching method ==
A Learning Process For Playing The Guitar Book 1 and Guitar Fundamentals Books 2, 3, 4 and 5 are based on Bradan's handwritten manuscript. Print copies are in the collection of the Toronto Public Library.

Tony also created an instructional book and accompanying 45 rpm record entitled Basic Guitar Lessons (Silvertone).

== Recordings ==
Bobby Gimby Plays Dixieland

(various recordings) with Mart Kenney and His Western Gentlemen

Les Foster and Five Fabulous Friends

Latin Lustre by Chicho Valle and His Orchestra

CBC Television's Summertime '58, The Tony Bradan Quintet (Sept 11, 1958)

CBC Radio's The Sound of Guitars, Tony Bradan, various other (1963–1968)

Guitariana by Giovanni Liberatore (arranger: Tony Bradan)

== Students ==
Tony's students included George Arvola, Neville Barnes, Gary Benson, Ed Bickert, Larry Chown, Art DeVilliers, Bobby Edwards, Mike Francis, Kenny Gill, Warren Greig, Fergus Hambleton, Peter Harris, Andy Krehm, Ihor Kukurudza, Bill Lechow, John Liberatore, Lorne Lofsky, Michael Maguire, Danny Marks, Rob Martin, Kim Mitchell, James Pett, Jeff Peacock, Rob Piltch, Whitney Smith, Richard Stewardson, Bruce Todd, Rainer Wiens, Barton Wigg and Dean Zimmerman.
