= Jelenak =

Jelenak Јеленак
- Village
- Location within Montenegro
- Coordinates: 42.563940°N 19.151014°E
- Country: Montenegro
- Municipality: Danilovgrad

Population (2011)
  - Total: 104
- Time zone: UTC+1 (CET)
  - Summer (DST): UTC+2 (CEST)

Jelenak (Montenegrin: Јеленак) is a small village in the municipality of Danilovgrad, Montenegro.

== Demographics ==
According to the 2011 census, its population was 104.

Ethnicity in 2011
Ethnicity	Number	Percentage
Montenegrins	80	76.9%
Serbs	18	17.3%
other/undeclared	6	5.8%
Total	104	100%
