= Selim Begu Mustafa =

- Born: c. 1830
- Died: 1879; Corfu
- Other name: Selim-beg Mustafagić
- Occupations: Albanian lord and bey

Selim Begu Mustafa or Selim-beg Mustafagić (c. 1830 – 1879) was an Albanian lord and bey of Bar in the 19th century. He was the son of Mustafa Aga, who derived from Durrës, and was one of the first to settle in Bar after the Ottoman conquest in 1571. Selim Begu Mustafa fought against the Montenegrins and ruled with the Bosnian-Albanian nobility against the Porte.

== Life and death ==
Mustafa Begu managed to maintain power by bribing his friends in Constantinople. Over the years, relations between Montenegro and Turkey worsened resulting in the Montenegrins occupying Žabljak on Lake Shkodër (Skadar lake). The Ottoman-Albanian irregulars, under Selim Begu, countered them. In 1851, he was appointed commander of the forces in Bar and received money from the Albanians of Mirdita. Fighting with the Montenegrins continued in 1852, and in order to stand out as a commander, Begu attacked Godinje. The attack was countered by the Montenegrins and Selim had to return to Bar eager for revenge. Eventually he occupied Godinje and then attacked Martinići and occupied the Ostrog Monastery. There they were attacked by a large Montenegrin force and were forced to retreat with many dead and wounded.

The loss led to a quarrel between Selim Begu and the commander of Diber, Abdurahman-Beg. On June 27, 1851, Selim Begu was in the local bazar when a killing, out of sacrilegious reasons, occurred. These types of happening worsened relations between Christians and Muslims but under Selim Begus rule the Catholics, Orthodox and Muslims lived in peace and preferred Selim Begu's rule over Prince Nikola, who later seized the city. Selim Begu had large ambitions and was criticized by Abdurahamn-Beg for thinking that he was ”Mahmut Pasha Bushatliu”. Selim Begu continued to work on strengthening the city walls and fixing the border to Montenegro which Ahmet Dzevdet, an Ottoman commander, had commenced. After Omer Pasha Lata visited Montenegro, the situation was calmed. However, in Krnjići, in 1862, a sharp clash between Albanians and Montenegrins occurred. In order to secure his safety, Selim Begu built a high wall around his palace in Darzhak. He also called for the Catholic Albanians of Šušanjane.

Afterwards, the bey heard of a rebellion in Hercegovina by Luka Vukalovic and decided to gather troops to march. The Ottomans landed with ships and men, led by Dilaver Bey, outside the fort of Nehaj. Selim Begu gathered the Muslim locals of Bar against the Montenegrins of Crmnica and Papani. The Montenegrins suffered 100 men. Despite his religious tolerance Selim Begu ruled with an iron fist making him unpopular and there were occasionally revolts against him. He would call for the local Albanians to help him. On November 13, 1877, Selim Begu was in Ulcinj when the Montenegrins attacked the city. Begu was joined by 300 Albanians from the city and another 300 from Shkodër, led by Shaban-Beg Bushatliu to defend the city. When the Montenegrins attacked Bar in 1878, Selim Begu surrendered to Prince Nikola to whom he said ”You are a fortunate lord to the city”. After he was released, he moved to Corfu where he died and was buried.
