= Lalevići =

Lalevići Лалевићи
- Village
- Location within Montenegro
- Coordinates: 42.564242°N 19.094295°E
- Country: Montenegro
- Municipality: Danilovgrad

Population (2011)
  - Total: 151
- Time zone: UTC+1 (CET)
  - Summer (DST): UTC+2 (CEST)

Lalevići (Serbian Cyrillic: Лалевићи) is a small village in the municipality of Danilovgrad, Montenegro.

== Demographics ==
According to the 2011 census, its population was 151.

Ethnicity in 2011
Ethnicity	Number	Percentage
Montenegrins	76	50.3%
Serbs	43	28.5%
other/undeclared	32	21.2%
Total	151	100%
