= Zagorak =

Zagorak Загорак
- Village
- Location within Montenegro
- Coordinates: 42.619688°N 19.030596°E
- Country: Montenegro
- Municipality: Danilovgrad

Population (2011)
  - Total: 130
- Time zone: UTC+1 (CET)
  - Summer (DST): UTC+2 (CEST)

Zagorak (Serbian Cyrillic: Загорак) is a small village in the municipality of Danilovgrad, Montenegro.

== Demographics ==
According to the 2011 census, its population was 130.

Ethnicity in 2011
Ethnicity	Number	Percentage
Montenegrins	99	76.2%
Serbs	28	21.5%
other/undeclared	3	2.3%
Total	130	100%
