= Soloy Pathfinder 21 =

American twin-engined utility aircraft

General information
- Type: Utility aircraft
- Manufacturer: Cessna/Soloy
- Status: Scrapped
- Number built: 1

History
- Developed from: Cessna 208 Caravan

The Soloy Pathfinder 21 was a twin-engined, single-propeller, turboprop aircraft. It is a modification by Soloy Aviation Solutions of a Cessna 208 Caravan airframe. First flown in 1995, the aircraft was essentially a stock Cessna 208 airframe that has been stretched by 72 inches (1.83 m) with structural reinforcement, powered by twin Pratt & Whitney Canada PT6D-114A engines in a side-by-side Dual Pac configuration in place of the original single engine.

The aircraft performed its last flight in the late 1990s and was stored for more than 20 years, before being parted out and scrapped.

== Design and development ==
Soloy modified a Cessna 208 to construct a prototype Pathfinder 21, with its first flight in 1995. The Dual Pac PT6D-114A engine used in the Pathfinder 21 gained its FAA Supplemental type certificatee in 1997. Soloy was attempting to obtain FAA certification for the aircraft conversion, but after completing over 80% of the certification work, Soloy announced that it was halting the entire program. The CEO explained that the FAA requires aircraft with more than nine passengers to have the airframe meet tougher restrictions required by Federal Aviation Regulation (FAR) Part 25, which is a practical impossibility, since the Cessna 208 does not meet those requirements. This requirement made marketing the airplane unfeasible, as the expanded passenger cabin was a major reason for the stretch to begin with.

== Specifications ==
Data from Soloy

General characteristics

- Crew: 1-2
- Capacity: 15-19 passengers
- Length: 46 ft 11 in (14.3 m)
- Wingspan: 52 ft 1 in (15.88 m)
- Height: 16 ft 6 in (5.02 m)
- Wing area: 279.4 sq ft (25.96 m^{2})
- Empty weight: 7,300 lb (3,311 kg)
- Gross weight: 12,000 lb (5,443 kg)
- Max takeoff weight: 12,410 lb (5,629 kg)
- Powerplant: 2 × Pratt & Whitney Canada PT6D-114A in a Soloy Dual Pac Combined output twin turboprop, 664.5 hp (495.5 kW) each

Performance

- Cruise speed: 180 kn (210 mph, 340 km/h)
- Stall speed: 66 kn (76 mph, 122 km/h)
- Range: 467.4 nmi (537.9 mi, 865.6 km)
- Service ceiling: 27,400 ft (8,350 m)
- Rate of climb: 1,500 ft/min (7.6 m/s)

== See also ==
=== Related development ===
- Cessna 208
