= Potkula =

Potkula Поткула
- Village
- Location within Montenegro
- Coordinates: 42.567976°N 19.142354°E
- Country: Montenegro
- Municipality: Danilovgrad

Population (2011)
  - Total: 325
- Time zone: UTC+1 (CET)
  - Summer (DST): UTC+2 (CEST)

Potkula (Serbian Cyrillic: Поткула) is a village in the municipality of Danilovgrad, Montenegro.

== Demographics ==
According to the 2011 census, its population was 325.

Ethnicity in 2011
Ethnicity	Number	Percentage
Montenegrins	196	60.3%
Serbs	90	27.7%
other/undeclared	39	12.0%
Total	325	100%
