= Cessna 208 Caravan =

Family of utility transport aircraft

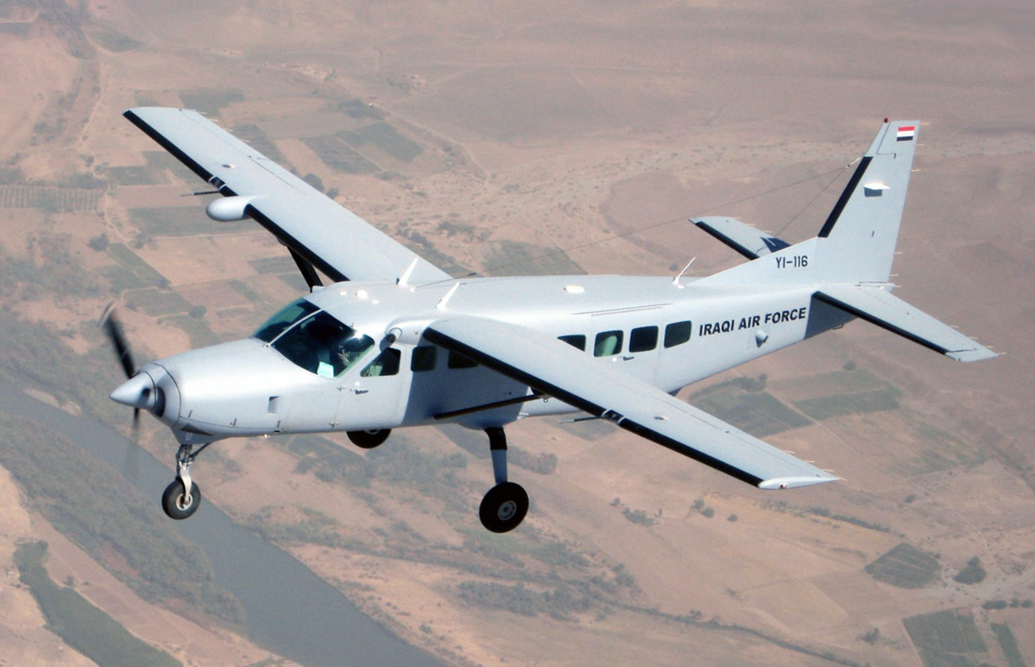
- An Iraqi Air Force Cessna 208B Grand Caravan

General information
- Type: Regional airliner, utility aircraft
- National origin: United States
- Manufacturer: Cessna
- Status: In service
- Primary users: FedEx Feeder: Brazilian Air Force; Afghan Air Force; Colombian Aerospace Force
- Number built: 3,000 (2022)

History
- Manufactured: 1982–present
- Introduction date: 1984
- First flight: December 9, 1982
- Variant: Soloy Pathfinder 21

The Cessna 208 Caravan is a utility aircraft produced by Cessna. The project was commenced on November 20, 1981, and the prototype first flew on December 9, 1982. The production model was certified by the FAA in October 1984 and its Cargomaster freighter variant was developed for FedEx. The 4 ft (1.2 m) longer 208B Super Cargomaster first flew in 1986 and was developed into the passenger 208B Grand Caravan.

The strutted, high wing 208 typically seats nine passengers in its unpressurized cabin, is powered by a single Pratt & Whitney Canada PT6A tractor turboprop and has a fixed tricycle landing gear, floats, or skis.

By 2022, 3,000 had been delivered and 24 million flight hours have been logged. Caravans have been used for flight training, commuter airlines, VIP transport, air cargo, skydiving and humanitarian missions.

== Development ==
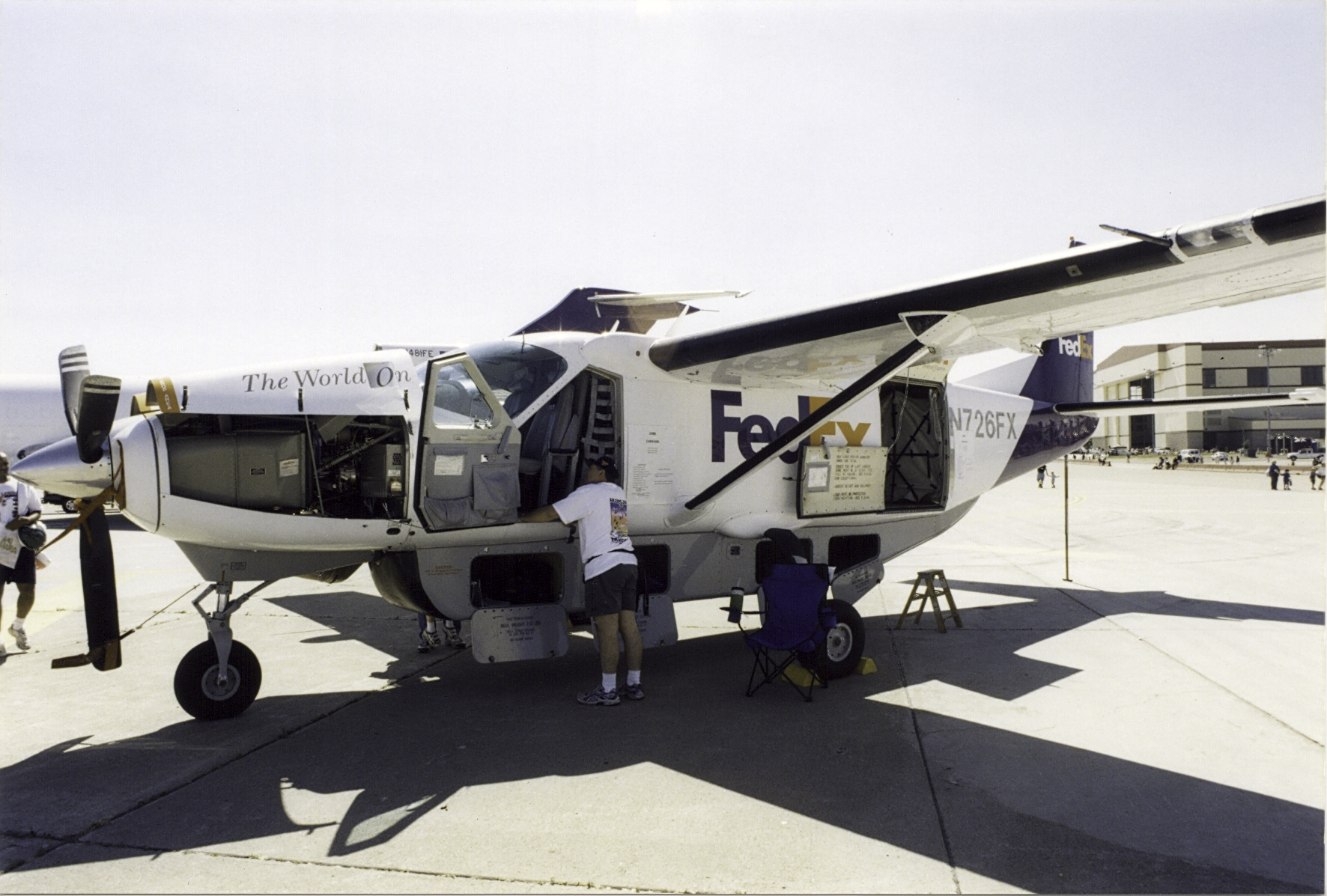
A FedEx Super Cargomaster with cargo pod. The Cargomaster and Super Cargomaster variants are built without cabin windows.

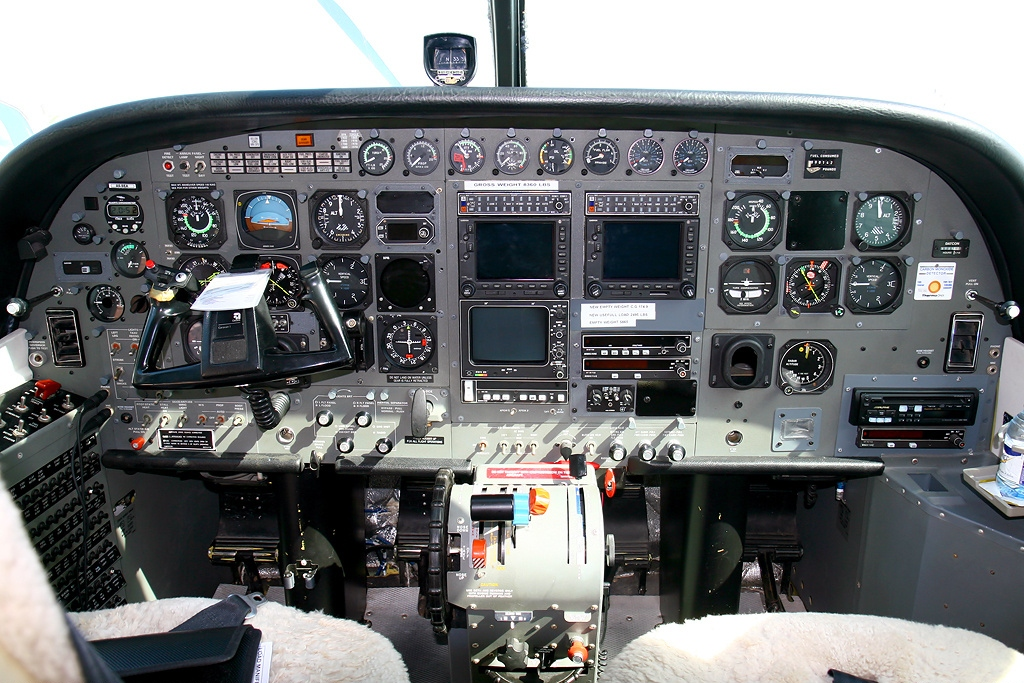
Cockpit of a pre-2008 Caravan

On November 20, 1981, the project was given a go-ahead by Cessna for its Pawnee engineering facility. John Berwick, chief engineer at Pawnee, conceived of a single engine, high-wing airplane with a large payload. Berwick had originally approached Vice President Bill Boettger with the idea and once Dwane Wallace approved it, Berwick told Russ Meyer he would design it.

The prototype first flew on December 9, 1982. The production model was certified by the Federal Aviation Administration (FAA) in October 1984.

Deliveries began in 1985, and amphibious floats were approved that same year. A freighter variant without cabin windows was developed at the request of Federal Express as the Cargomaster. FedEx had been initially planning to build twin-engine piston-powered airplanes with Piper Aircraft, but picked the Caravan after surveying it and having flown the prototype, becoming its standard carrier.

Another cargo variant for Federal Express, with a longer fuselage and a cargo pod under the belly, was developed as the 208B Super Cargomaster and flew for the first time in 1986. Stretched by 4 ft (1.2 m), it received its FAA type certification also in 1986. A passenger model, the 208B Grand Caravan, was derived from the Super Cargomaster. It was first delivered in 1990.

Since then, the Caravan has undergone a number of design evolutions, including upgrading the avionics in 2008 to provide a glass cockpit with the Garmin G1000 system. In January 2013 a higher-powered (867 shp from P&WC PT6A-140) version, the Grand Caravan EX, received FAA certification.

In August 2016, Textron announced that it would move the Cessna 208 production line from its Wichita headquarters to its Independence, Kansas, production facility, for manufacture alongside the piston-powered 172, 182, 206 and TTx, and the Citation M2 light jet. The move was made to make room for production of the Citation Longitude and Denali in Wichita. In 2023, the 208 Caravan unit cost was US$2.32 million and US$2.61 million for the 208B Grand Caravan EX.

=== Chinese production ===
In May 2012, Cessna announced that an assembly line for the 208 would be established in China, with the government-owned China Aviation Industry General Aircraft (CAIGA) conducting final assembly of Caravans at its plant in Shijiazhuang for the Chinese market. Chinese government approval was granted in September the following year and the first Chinese-assembled Caravan was delivered in December 2013. By April 2016 about 30 aircraft, assembled from kits of parts shipped from the US by Cessna, had been delivered to Chinese operators by the joint venture.

== Design ==
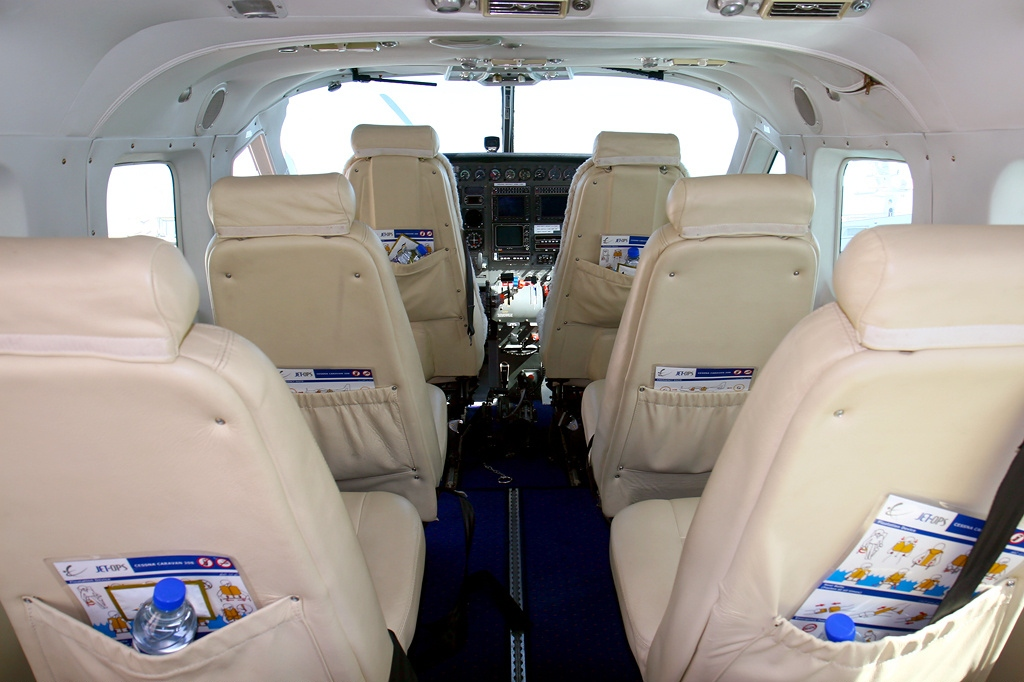
Low-density seating in the cabin of a passenger-carrying version

The Cessna 208 is a high-wing braced cabin monoplane powered by a single Pratt & Whitney Canada PT6A turboprop in tractor configuration. The cabin has room for nine passengers and two crew when used as a passenger aircraft with four doors: one for each crew member, an airstair door on the right side of the cabin and a cargo door on the left. The aircraft can be optionally fitted with an underslung cargo pod.

The basic 208 airframe has a fixed tricycle landing gear but can also be fitted with various types of landing gear, allowing it to operate in a wide variety of environments. Some common adaptations include floats with retractable landing gear on the Caravan Amphibian model, and skis.

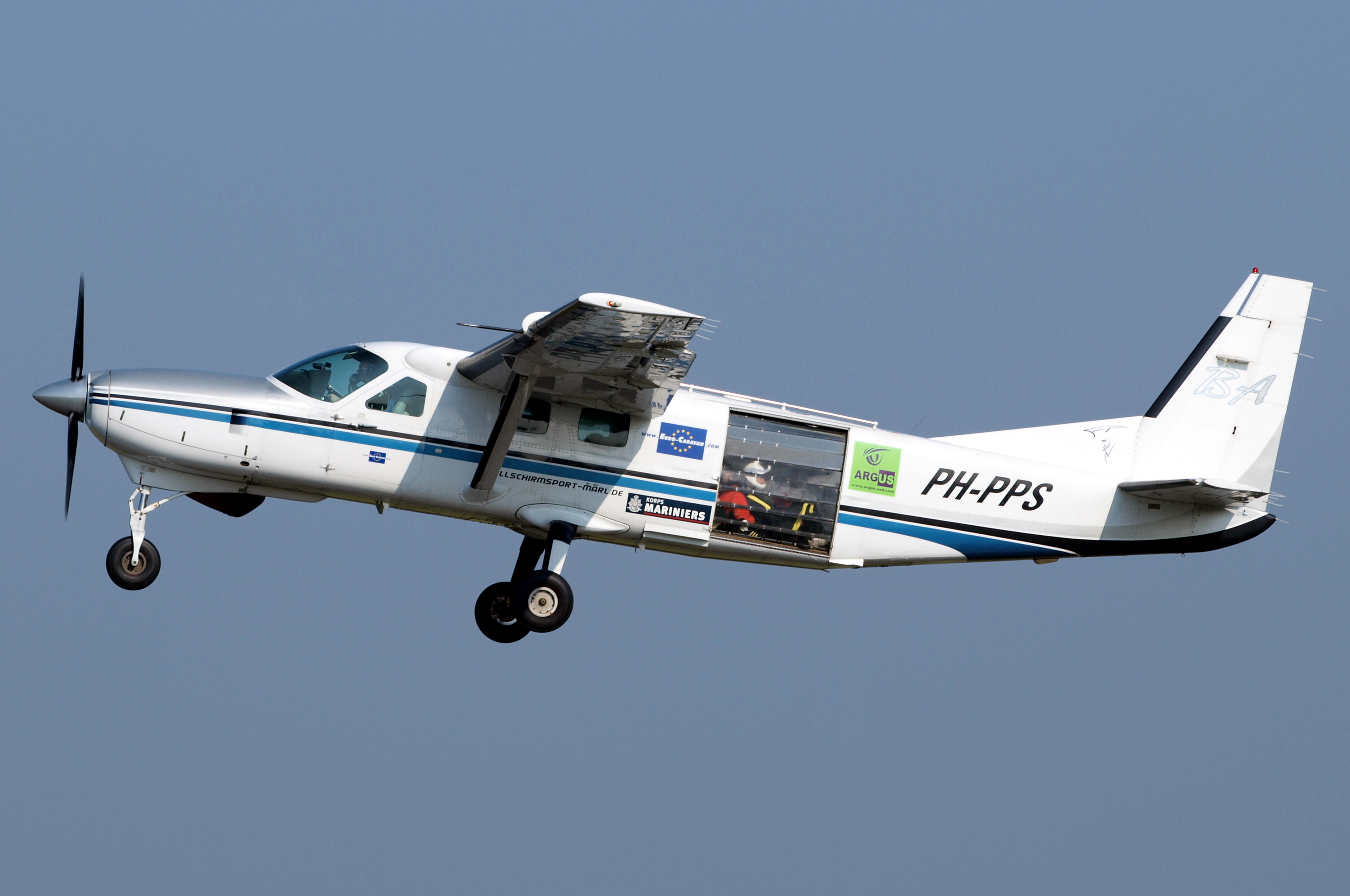
208B Grand Caravan in the Netherlands, modified with roller door for parachuting operations; skydivers sitting on the cabin floor are visible inside the rear roller door

The Caravan interior can be outfitted with seats or as a cargo compartment. The standard high-density airline configuration has four rows of 1-2 seating behind the two seats in the cockpit. This variant is capable of holding up to thirteen passengers, although it is marketed as being able to make a profit carrying just four.

The cabin can be configured in a low density passenger configuration, with 1-1 seating, as a combination of passengers and cargo, or as a strictly cargo aircraft. Many variants include an underbelly cargo pod, which can be used for additional freight capacity, or for passenger baggage. A number of Caravans are operated as skydiving aircraft with the left-side cargo hatch converted to a roll-up door.

The airplane typically seats nine passengers with a single pilot, although with a FAR Part 23 waiver it can seat up to fourteen passengers. The aircraft is also used for cargo operations.

The short-fuselage Caravan burns 48 US gal (180 L) of fuel per hour at 170 kn (310 km/h; 200 mph) for 200 nmi (370 km; 230 mi) stages.

== Variants ==
=== Civilian ===
208 Caravan
First production variant with a PT6A-114 turboprop engine and seating for up to nine passengers. The landplane variant was type approved on October 23, 1984, and the seaplane version with Wipline Model 8000 Amphibious/Seaplane Floats was type approved on March 26, 1986. Early aircraft can be modified to use the higher-powered PT6A-114A but have restricted operating limits.

- 208 Caravan 675

Marketing designation for the 208 Caravan with a higher-powered PT6A-114A engine.

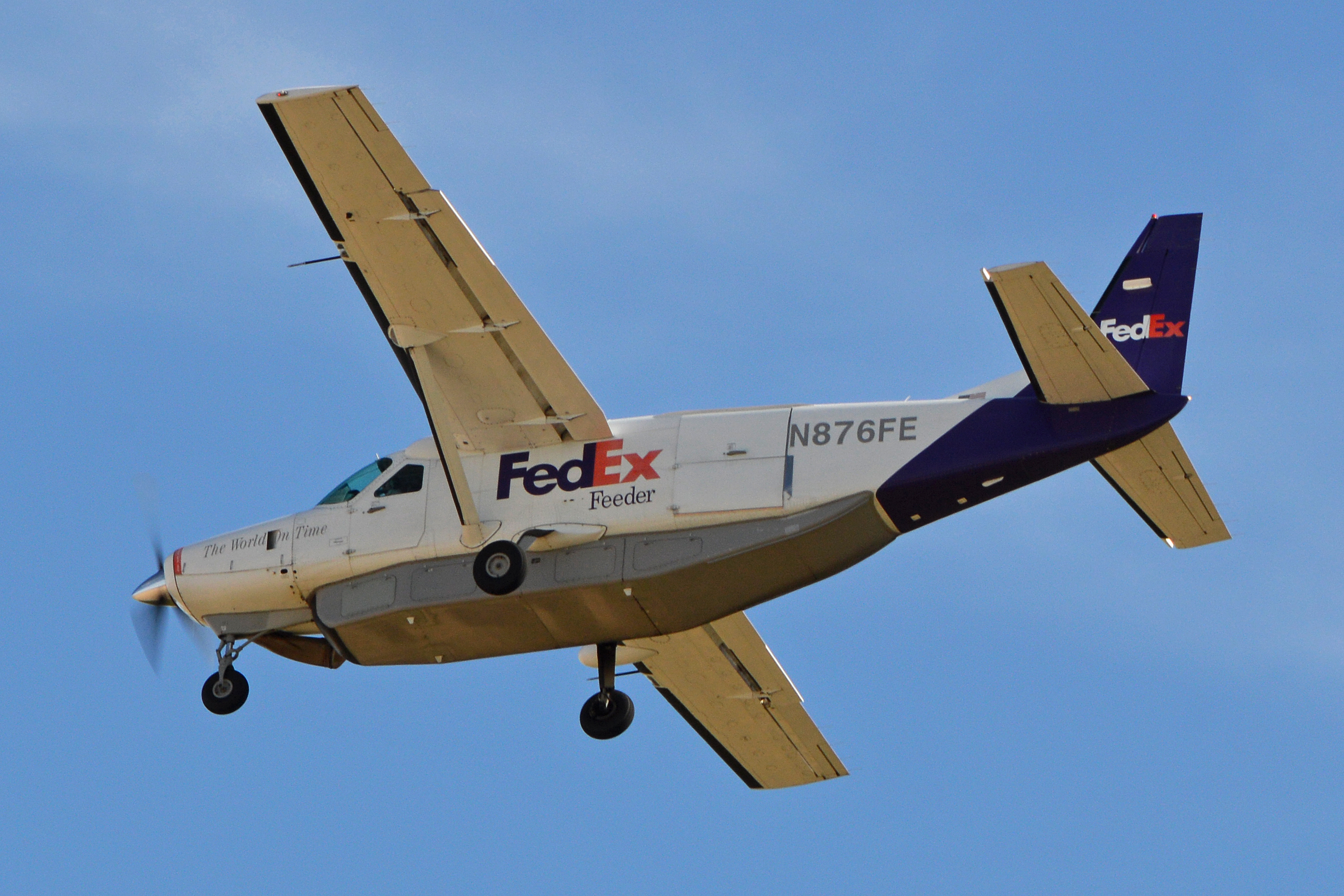
A FedEx 208B Super Cargomaster

208A Cargomaster
A pure-cargo version of the Caravan developed with Federal Express (now FedEx); 40 aircraft produced. All 208A aircraft were serialized as 208 models.

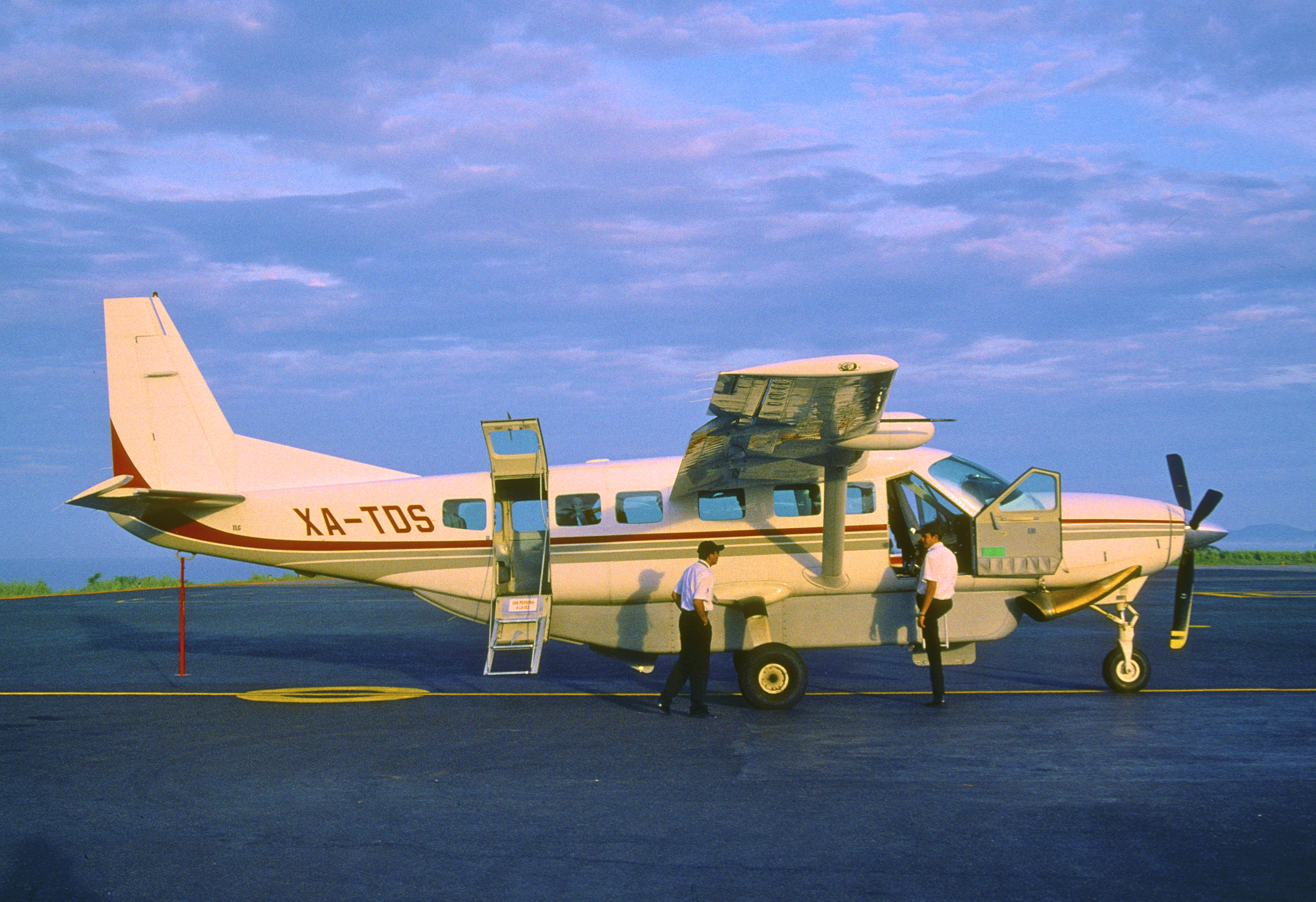
208B Grand Caravan in Mexico with its right rear airstair door open. The 208B Grand Caravan is 4 feet (1.2 m) longer than the 208, and the passenger-carrying version has eight side windows instead of the 208's six.

208B Grand Caravan
Officially named the 208B Caravan but marketed as the Grand Caravan. The 208B is 4 ft (1.2 m) longer than the 208; extending the cabin by the same amount. The 208B has a PT6A-114A engine. It was originally certified as a two-seater cargo version on October 9, 1986, and as an 11-seater passenger aircraft on December 13, 1989.

- 208B Grand Caravan EX

Marketing name for upgraded version of the 208B Caravan certified in December 2012, with a more powerful 867 hp (647 kW) Pratt and Whitney Canada PT6A-140 that improves the rate of climb by 38% and was developed by Pratt & Whitney Canada specifically to power the 208B. The unladen weight is 807 lb (366 kg) more but maximum payload is only 90 lb (41 kg) more. While the 192 hp (143 kW) more powerful PT6A-140 gives a 11-knot (13 mph; 20 km/h) higher cruise speed – and rate of climb is improved by 94 feet per minute (0.48 m/s), range is reduced to 964 nautical miles (1,785 km; 1,109 mi) on a similar fuel capacity. It requires a longer take off run at 2,160 feet (660 m) and its landing roll is at 1,871 feet (570 m). In early October 2019, after just under six years in production, the company had delivered 500 Grand Caravan EXs.

- 208B Super Cargomaster

Marketing name for the cargo variant of the 208B series. FedEx purchased 260 of this variant.

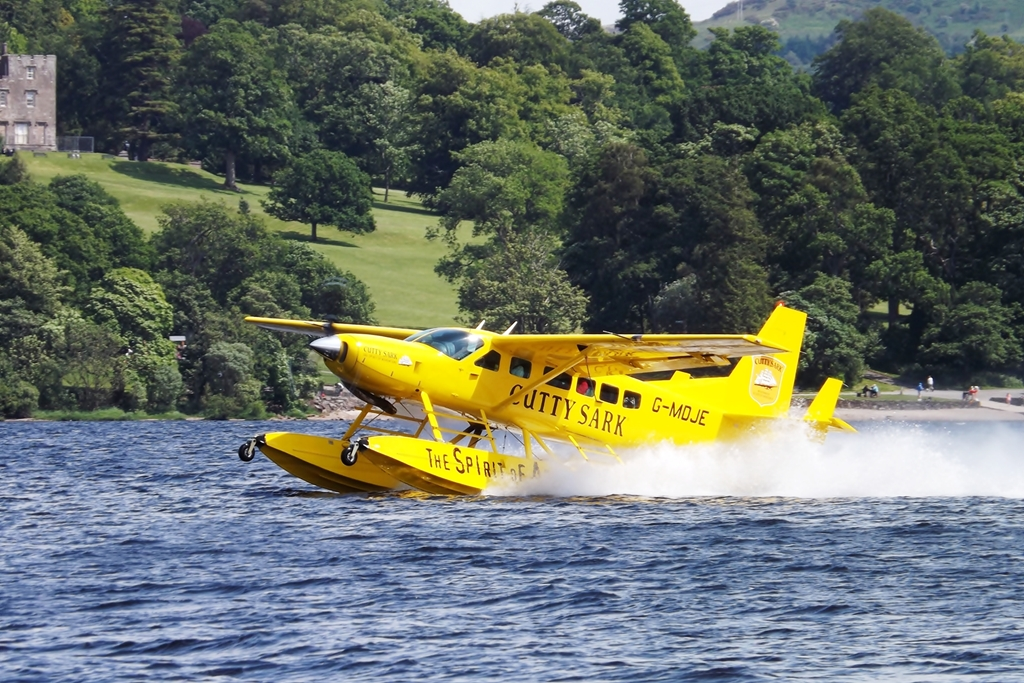
Amphibious Caravan taking off from Loch Lomond in Scotland

Caravan Amphibian
A 208 or 208B with either Wipaire 8000 or 8750 floats that have retractable landing gear, for water landings or land operations.

=== Aftermarket variants ===
Production aircraft modified after delivery by Supplemental Type Certificates:

Soloy Pathfinder 21
Single example of a twin-engined stretched fuselage development of the 208 by the Soloy Corporation. Two PT6D-114A engines mounted side-by-side drove a single propeller; and the fuselage was extended by 70 inches (1.8 m) behind the wing. The project was abandoned as the design was unable to meet certification requirements.
850 Caravan
208 with an 850 hp (634 kW) Honeywell TPE331-12JR-701S engine, installed by Aero Twin Inc.
950 Grand Caravan
208B with a 1,000 hp (746 kW) Honeywell TPE331-12JR-704AT engine, installed by Aero Twin Inc.
Blackhawk Caravan
208 and 208B conversion to 850 hp (634 kW) PT6A-42A.
Supervan 900
208B with a 850 hp (634 kW) (900 hp (671 kW) flat-rated) Honeywell TPE331-12JR engine, installed by Texas Turbine Conversions, Inc.
XP42A Upgrade
208B with an 850 hp (634 kW) Pratt & Whitney Canada PT6A-42A engine, installed by Blackhawk

=== Experimental ===
The eCaravan is an electric aircraft modification of the 208B built by AeroTEC and magniX powered by a 750 hp (560 kW) motor and a 1 t (2,200 lb), 750 V lithium-ion battery. The plane's 30-minute first flight happened from Grant County International Airport in Moses Lake, Washington, on May 28, 2020, consuming US$6 worth of electricity, needing 30–40 min of charging.

The Magni500-powered variant can fly 100 nautical miles (185 km; 115 mi) with 4–5 passengers while keeping reserve power, and aims for a certification by the end of 2021, hoping to operate 100 nmi (185 km; 115 mi) flights with a full load of nine passengers with better batteries.

=== Military ===
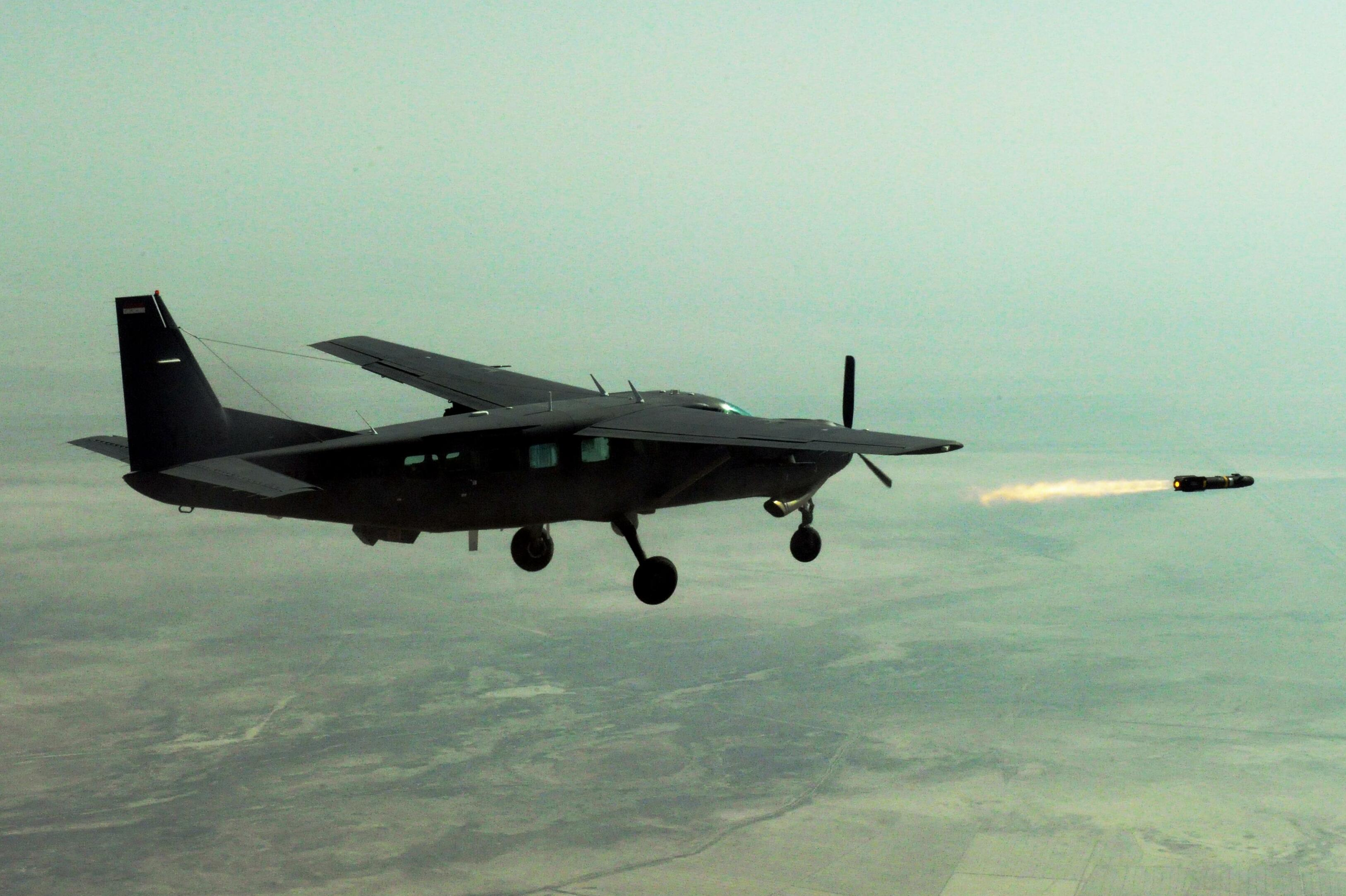
An Iraqi Air Force Cessna 208B launches a Hellfire missile

U-27A
United States Department of Defense designation for the Cessna 208.
C-16
United States Department of Defense designation for proposed variant to be used by the United States Army in El Salvador and Nicaragua during the 1980s.
C-98
Brazilian Air Force designation for the standard U-27.
AC-208 Combat Caravan
Caravan with wing hardpoints. An ISTAR version built by ATK armed with Hellfire missiles is used by the Iraqi Air Force. The AC-208 received its combat debut in January 2014 when the Iraqi Air Force began employing it against insurgents in Anbar province. One aircraft crashed in March 2016.
The Lebanese Air Force requested a new AC-208 and the conversion of the 208 it already operated. Between 2009 and 2019, Northrop Grumman delivered two AC-208Bs and one RC-208B (an ISTAR variant) to the Lebanese Air Force.
Other AC-208s are scheduled to be delivered to countries in the Middle East and Africa through the Foreign Military Sales program. Mali, Mauritania, Niger and Burkina Faso are possible recipients of these AC-208 Combat Caravans.
MC-208 Guardian
The MC-208 Guardian multi-role aircraft is built on the Cessna Caravan, capable of performing aerial surveillance, close air support, casualty and medical evacuations, air mobility, and precision strike all in one mission without the need for reconfiguration, eliminating the need to deploy and operate multiple aircraft. It was selected as one of five finalists for the United States Special Operations Command's (USSOCOM's) Armed Overwatch program.

== Operators ==
The 1,000th was delivered in 1998; the 1,500th in 2005; the 2,000th in 2010; the 2,500th in 2015; and the 3,000th in 2022. By March 2022, 24 million flight hours have been logged.

Certified in 100 countries, Caravans are used for flight training, recreation, commuter airlines, VIP transport, cargo carriers and humanitarian missions. It is also used by government agencies in law enforcement, air ambulance services, police and military.

=== Civil operators ===
The Cessna 208 is used by governmental organizations and by a large number of companies for police, air ambulance, passenger transport, air charter, freight and parachuting operations. FedEx operates 239 aircraft.

=== Military operators ===
A total of 123 Cessna 208s were in military service as transport in 2024.

== Accidents and incidents ==
As of February 2025, there have been 277 Caravan hull losses from all causes, including 271 accidents causing 516 fatalities – an average of 2 fatalities per hull-loss, with 27.4% of all occupants surviving fatal accidents; and eight hijackings causing one fatality. For the 198 out of the 277 hull-loss occurrences where the aircraft was in use and its flight nature is known, 36.9% were passenger flights, 33.8% cargo flights, 8.1% military flights, 5.6% special flights – agriculture, survey, etc., 4% private and business flights, 3% test or flight training and 8.1% miscellaneous uses – demonstrations, deliveries, illegal.

== Specifications (208 Caravan) ==
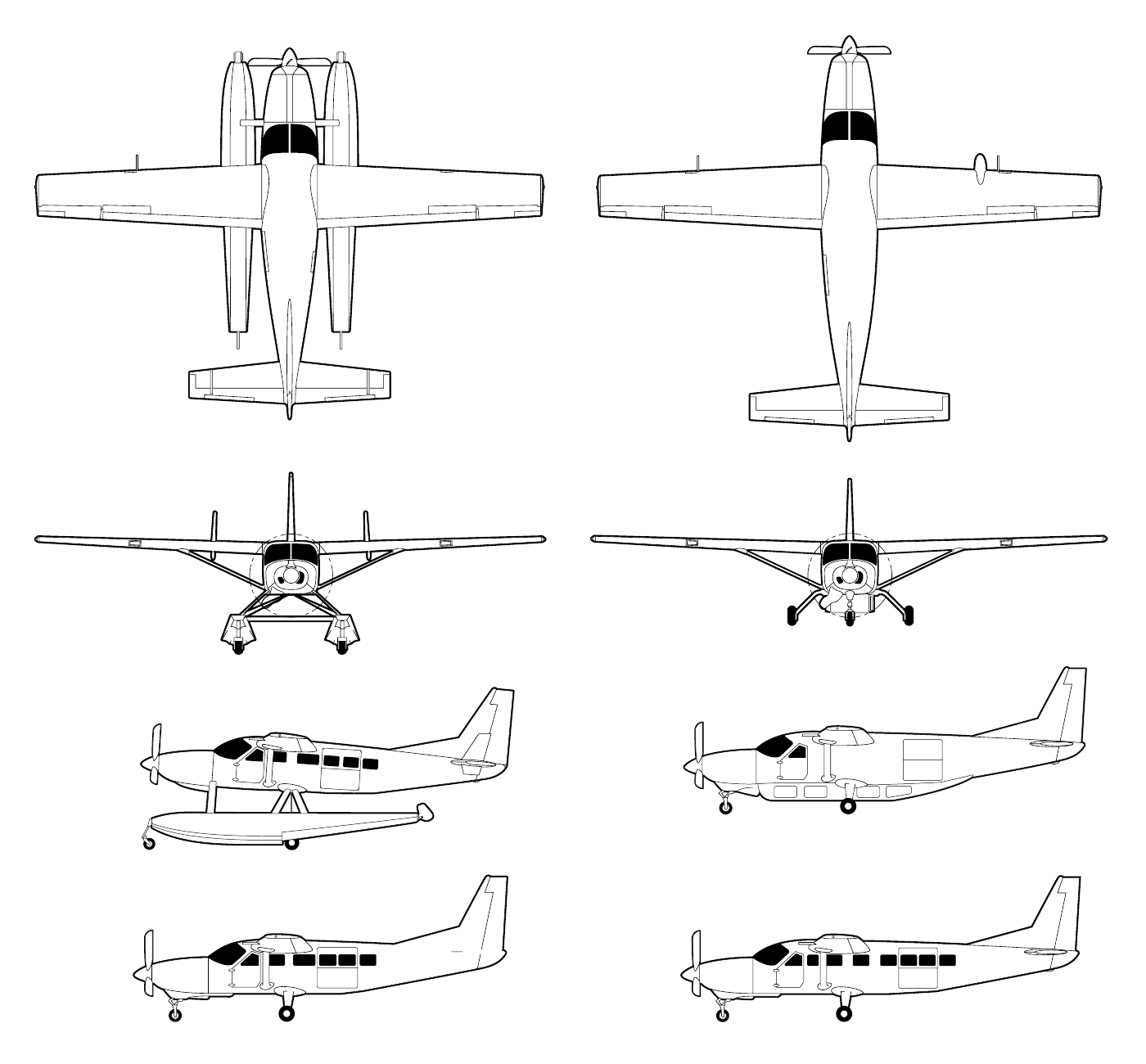
Left: three-axis view of 208 Caravan Amphibian and side view of standard 208 Caravan Right: 208B Grand Caravan with side views of Super Cargomaster and standard versions

Data from Cessna Textron

General characteristics

- Crew: 1 or 2
- Capacity: 9 passengers (13 with FAR Part 23 waiver)
- Length: 37 ft 7 in (11.46 m)
- Wingspan: 52 ft 1 in (15.87 m)
- Height: 14 ft 11 in (4.53 m)
- Wing area: 279 sq ft (25.96 m^{2})
- Aspect ratio: 9.702
- Airfoil: wing root: NACA 23017.424, wing tip: NACA 23012
- Empty weight: 4,730 lb (2,145 kg)
- Max takeoff weight: 8,000 lb (3,629 kg)
- Fuel capacity: 2,224 lb (1,009 kg) / 332 US gal (1,257 L)
- Cabin height: 54 in (1.37 m)
- Cabin width: 64 in (1.63 m)
- Powerplant: 1 × Pratt & Whitney Canada PT6A-114A turboprop, 675 shp (503 kW)
- Propellers: 3-bladed McCauley constant speed, full feathering, reversible pitch

Performance

- Cruise speed: 186 kn (214 mph, 344 km/h) true air speed
- Stall speed: 61 kn (70 mph, 113 km/h) calibrated air speed
- Range: 1,070 nmi (1,230 mi, 1,980 km)
- Service ceiling: 25,000 ft (7,600 m)
- Rate of climb: 1,234 ft/min (6.27 m/s)
- Wing loading: 28.674 lb/sq ft (140.00 kg/m^{2})

Avionics

- Garmin G1000 with GFC700 integrated digital automatic flight control system

== See also ==
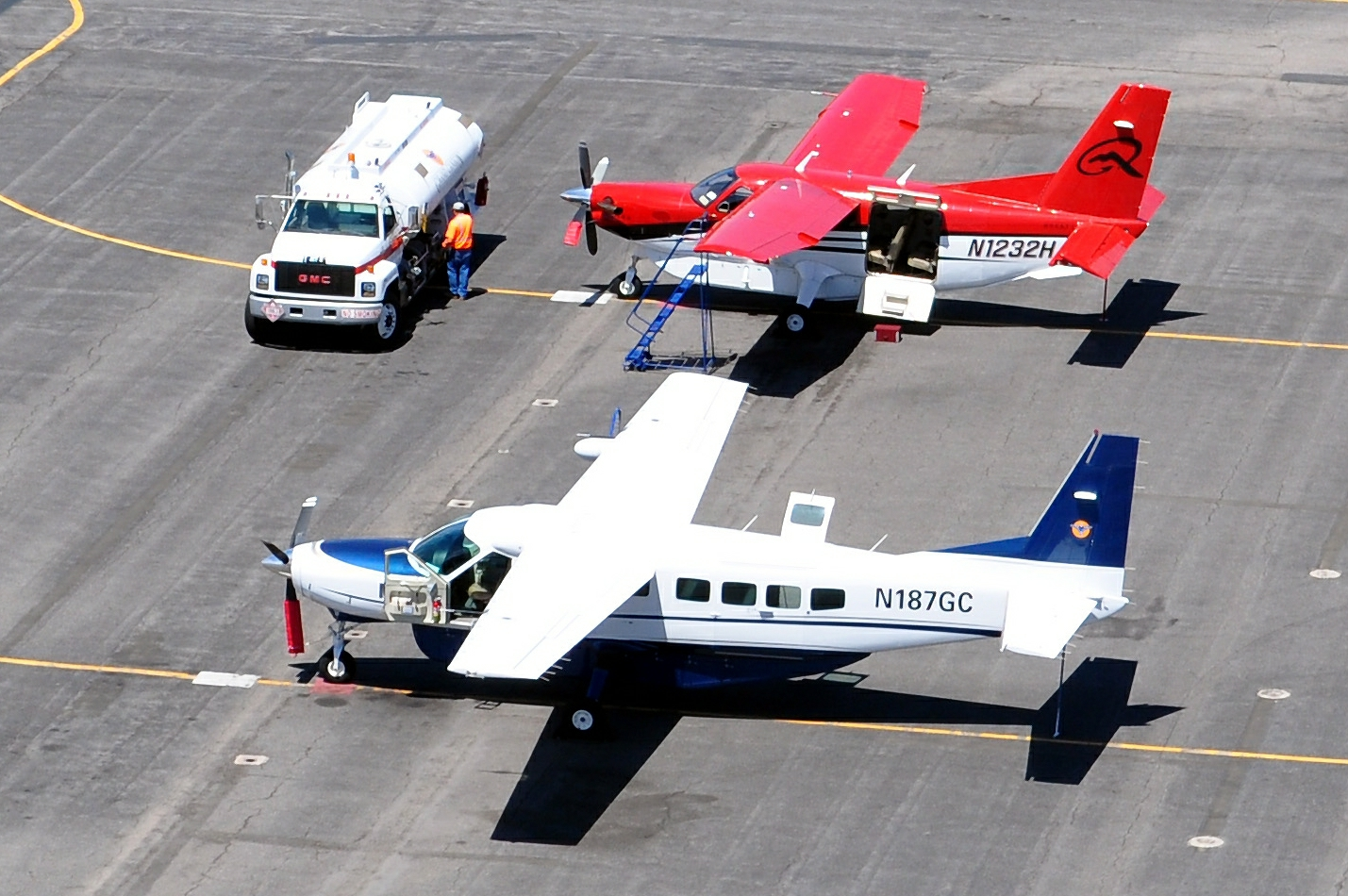
A 208B Grand Caravan (foreground) alongside a Quest Kodiak on an airport apron

- Cessna 408 SkyCourier
- Reims-Cessna F406 Caravan II

Related development

- Soloy Pathfinder 21

Aircraft of comparable role, configuration, and era

- GippsAero GA10
- PAC 750XL
- Pilatus PC-12
- Quest Kodiak
