= Novo Selo, Danilovgrad =

Novo Selo Ново Село
- Village
- Location within Montenegro
- Coordinates: 42.501978°N 19.158292°E
- Country: Montenegro
- Municipality: Danilovgrad

Population (2011)
  - Total: 613
- Time zone: UTC+1 (CET)
  - Summer (DST): UTC+2 (CEST)

Novo Selo (Montenegrin Cyrillic: Ново Село) is a village in the municipality of Danilovgrad, Montenegro. It is located along the road from Podgorica to Danilovgrad. The etymology of the village comes from Montenegrin meaning New Village.

== Demographics ==
According to the 2011 census, its population was 613.

Ethnicity in 2011
Ethnicity	Number	Percentage
Montenegrins	360	58.7%
Serbs	193	31.5%
other/undeclared	60	9.8%
Total	613	100%
