= Vučica, Danilovgrad =

Vučica Вучица
- Village
- Location within Montenegro
- Coordinates: 42.576752°N 19.105118°E
- Country: Montenegro
- Municipality: Danilovgrad

Population (2011)
  - Total: 162
- Time zone: UTC+1 (CET)
  - Summer (DST): UTC+2 (CEST)

Vučica (Montenegrin Cyrillic: Вучица) is a small village in the municipality of Danilovgrad, Montenegro.

== Demographics ==
According to the 2011 census, its population was 162.

Ethnicity in 2011
Ethnicity	Number	Percentage
Montenegrins	100	61.7%
Serbs	48	29.6%
other/undeclared	14	18.6%
Total	162	100%
