= Daljam =

Daljam Даљам
- Village
- Location within Montenegro
- Coordinates: 42.486631°N 19.179329°E
- Country: Montenegro
- Municipality: Danilovgrad

Population (2011)
  - Total: 241
- Time zone: UTC+1 (CET)
  - Summer (DST): UTC+2 (CEST)

Daljam (Montenegrin Cyrillic: Даљам) is a village in the municipality of Danilovgrad, Montenegro.

== Demographics ==
According to the 2011 census, its population was 241.

Ethnicity in 2011
Ethnicity	Number	Percentage
Montenegrins	125	51.9%
Serbs	67	27.8%
other/undeclared	49	20.3%
Total	241	100%
