= Orja Luka =

Orja Luka Орја Лука
- Village
- Location within Montenegro
- Coordinates: 42.564223°N 19.079336°E
- Country: Montenegro
- Municipality: Danilovgrad

Population (2011)
  - Total: 279
- Time zone: UTC+1 (CET)
  - Summer (DST): UTC+2 (CEST)

Orja Luka (Montenegrin Cyrillic: Орја Лука) is a village in the municipality of Danilovgrad, Montenegro.

== Demographics ==
According to the 2011 census, its population was 279.

Ethnicity in 2011
Ethnicity	Number	Percentage
Montenegrins	228	81.7%
Serbs	46	16.5%
other/undeclared	5	1.8%
Total	279	100%
