= Bobulja =

Bobulja Бобуља
- Village
- Location within Montenegro
- Coordinates: 42.553564°N 19.163562°E
- Country: Montenegro
- Municipality: Danilovgrad

Population (2011)
  - Total: 235
- Time zone: UTC+1 (CET)
  - Summer (DST): UTC+2 (CEST)

Bobulja (Montenegrin Cyrillic: Бобуља) is a village in the municipality of Danilovgrad, Montenegro.

== Demographics ==
According to the 2011 census, its population was 235.

Ethnicity in 2011
Ethnicity	Number	Percentage
Montenegrins	119	50.6%
Serbs	98	41.7%
other/undeclared	18	7.7%
Total	235	100%
