= Jastreb Vuk-T =

Vuk-T
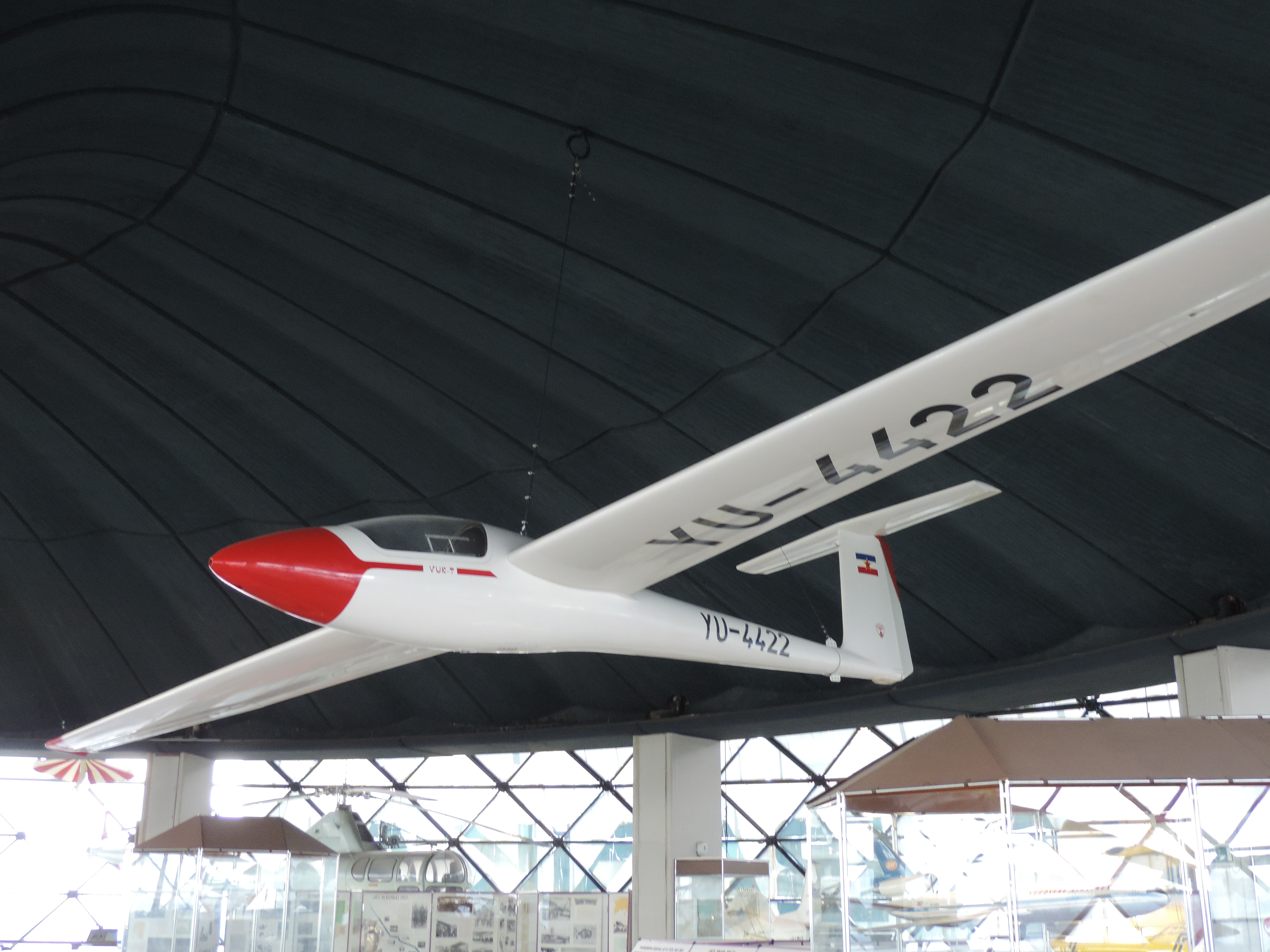

General information
- Type: Standard Class Sailplane
- National origin: Yugoslavia
- Manufacturer: FAJ Jastreb
- Designer: Prof. Dr. Tomislav Dragović
- Primary user: Yugoslav aeroclubs
- Number built: 114

History
- Introduction date: 1979
- First flight: 1977
- Concluded: 1988

The FAJ Jastreb Vuk-T often called Vuk (Serbian:Vuk - Wolf) is a Standard Class single-seat high-performance glider, intended for transition training, designed and built in the Yugoslavia from the late 1970s.

== Design and development ==
Vuk-T glider on apron of LJNM

Designed by Prof. Dr. Tomislav Dragović at the Faculty of Mechanical Engineering, Aero Engineering Institute, University of Belgrade, the Vuk-T was manufactured by FAJ Jastreb in Vršac entirely from fiberglass. After manufacture the gliders were first tested by the JRV and JNA before donation to state-sponsored aero clubs across the country.

Permitted to do the following aerobatic manoeuvres: loop, stall turn, steep turn and spin, the Vuk-t is popular in flying clubs because it reminds club members about free flying, the free donation of planes to clubs by the army and general Yugoslavian nostalgia. The majority of surviving Vuk-t gliders fly with aero-clubs with few aircraft in private ownership and are expected to have a long life due to the high structural strength and ease of maintenance.

The application of a supercritical wing has improved the performance of the aircraft so that the Vuk-T glider with a wingspan of 15 m is easy to control both at low and high speeds.

One peculiar attribute of the VUK-T can be characterized by a whistling sound when flying, often described as the howl of a wolf, (vuk meaning wolf in some languages used by peoples of the former Yugoslavia).

== Specifications (Vuk-T) ==
Data from

General characteristics

- Crew: 1
- Length: 6.5 m (21 ft 4 in)
- Wingspan: 15 m (49 ft 3 in)
- Height: 1.3 m (4 ft 3 in)
- Wing area: 11.955 m^{2} (128.68 sq ft)
- Airfoil: NASA GA(W)-1
- Empty weight: 260 kg (573 lb)
- Gross weight: 385 kg (849 lb)
- Minimum pilot weight equipped: 70 kg (154 lb)
- Maximum pilot weight equipped: 110 kg (243 lb)

Performance

- Stall speed: 59 km/h (37 mph, 32 kn)
- Never exceed speed: 240 km/h (150 mph, 130 kn)
- Max Rough air speed 150 km/h (81 kn; 93 mph)
- Max Aerotow speed 125 km/h (67 kn; 78 mph)
- Max Winch launch speed 110 km/h (59 kn; 68 mph)
- Maximum glide ratio: 37.5 at 105 km/h (57 kn; 65 mph)
- Rate of sink: 0.65 m/s (128 ft/min) at 78 km/h

Related lists

- List of gliders
