= Ćurilac =

Ćurilac Ћурилац
- Village
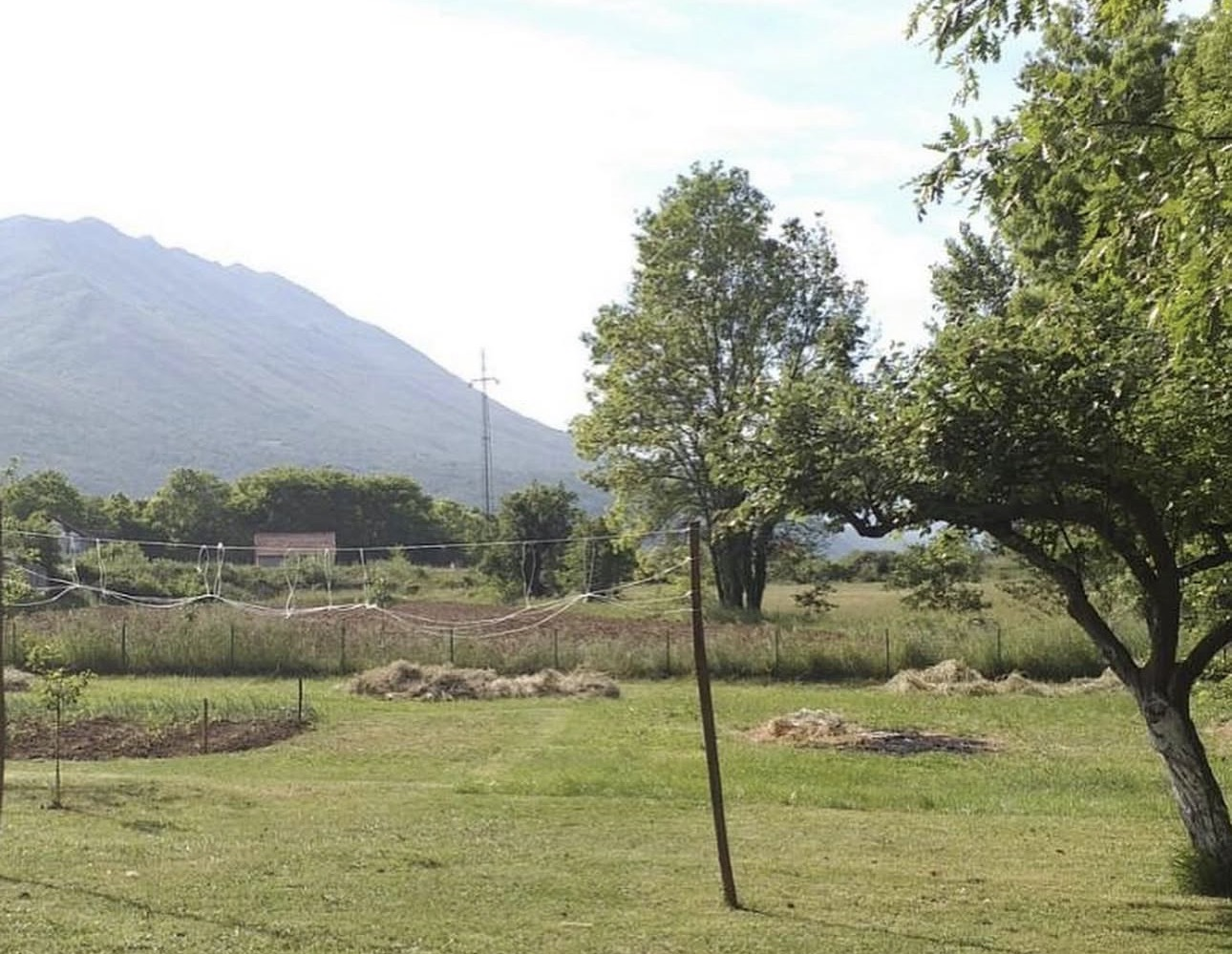

- Location within Montenegro
- Coordinates: 42.542856°N 19.121333°E
- Country: Montenegro
- Municipality: Danilovgrad

Population (2011)
  - Total: 548
- Time zone: UTC+1 (CET)
  - Summer (DST): UTC+2 (CEST)

Ćurilac (Montenegrin Cyrillic: Ћурилац) is a village in the municipality of Danilovgrad, Montenegro.

== Demographics ==
According to the 2011 census, its population was 548.

Population
Year	Pop.	±% p.a.
1948	414	—
1953	261	−8.81%
1961	525	+9.13%
1971	401	−2.66%
1981	571	+3.60%
1991	642	+1.18%
2003	489	−2.24%
2011	548	+1.43%

Ethnicity in 2011
Ethnicity	Number	Percentage
Montenegrins	365	66.6%
Serbs	161	29.4%
other/undeclared	22	4.0%
Total	548	100%
