= Brajovići =

- Village
- Location within Montenegro
- Coordinates: 42.553626°N 19.150554°E
- Country: Montenegro
- Municipality: Danilovgrad

Population (2011)
  - Total: 296
- Time zone: UTC+1 (CET)
  - Summer (DST): UTC+2 (CEST)

Brajovići (Montenegrin Cyrillic: Брајовићи) is a village in the municipality of Danilovgrad, Montenegro.

== Demographics ==
According to the 2011 census, its population was 296.

Ethnicity in 2011
Ethnicity	Number	Percentage
Montenegrins	230	77.7%
Serbs	53	17.9%
other/undeclared	13	4.4%
Total	296	100%
