= Mart Kenney =

Canadian musician

Herbert Martin Kenney C.M. (March 7, 1910 – February 8, 2006) was a Canadian jazz musician and bandleader of Mart Kenney and His Western Gentlemen.

== Musical career ==
Kenney was born in Toronto, Ontario, the son of Mildred Agnes (Martin) and Herbert Kenney. Kenney established himself as a leading alto and baritone saxophonist and clarinetist in the 1920s as a member of the CJOR Radio Orchestra and as a sideman to Len Chamberlain at the Hotel Vancouver. The Western Gentlemen were first formed in 1931 as a result of an engagement at Vancouver's Alexandra Ballroom, for which he recruited trumpeter-pianist Glen Griffith, trumpeter Jack Hemmings, saxophonist Bert Lister and bassist Hec MacCallum, who would later be joined by drummer Ed Emel and vocalist-saxophonist-pianist Art Hallman. Following their CJOR radio debut in 1934, the band embarked on a three-year run at the Waterton Glacier International Peace Park in Waterton Park, Alberta, adopting as its theme song the 1922 Billy Hill-Larry Yoell waltz, "The West, a Nest and You, Dear".

Kenney and his band gained a foothold in network radio in 1935 with the CRBC/CBC program 'Sweet and Low' which in turn led to cross-country tours and regular appearances at Toronto's Royal York Hotel. In 1938 the band began recording with RCA and by 1951 it had recorded some 25 78s for RCA Victor and Bluebird Records, as well as two for Dominion, featuring such hits as "The West, a Nest and You, Dear", "There's Honey on the Moon Tonight", and the Kenney original "We're Proud of Canada".

While originally a septet, Kenney toyed with his band's lineup frequently, enlarging it to as many as 30 musicians on some of his recordings. See "Appendix A~ Mart Kenney's Musicians" in Mart Kenney and his Western Gentlemen for additional details. Western Gentlemen's guitarist (Summer 1937–1942) Tony Bradan married former Western Gentlemen's vocalist (1940-late 1943) Judy Richards.

== Retirement from music and municipal career ==
Kenney's semi-retirement and relocation to Mission, British Columbia, saw the end of the Western Gentlemen. However, he continued to organize orchestras for special occasions such as CBC TV's In the Mood in 1971, and a Canadian National Exhibition appearance in 1975, and for engagements throughout the 1980s in the Vancouver area.

In Mission, Kenney took up the real estate business and ran successfully for municipal councillor, while also volunteering extensively with the National Parole Board, Corrections Canada, the Mission Chamber of Commerce and the BC Lions Society for Crippled Children and served on an advisory council for Mission medium security institution For his efforts on behalf of the community he was honoured with the status of Freeman of the municipality in 1979 and Citizen of the Year in 1981. In 1992 he was honoured with the title of Senior Citizen of the Year in British Columbia and in 1996 was made Mission's Ambassador-at-large. During his tenure on council, he helped establish a reserve fund with profits from the municipality's tree farm to support arts and culture in the community.

Kenney was made a member of the Order of Canada in 1980, and in 1985 was awarded an honorary LLD by the University of Lethbridge. In 1995, he reprised his wartime concert performances when he conducted a dance band at the Bay Street Armoury in Victoria, BC to celebrate the 50th anniversary of the end of the Second World War. The following year, he released a new album, Mart Kenney: the 78 rpm Years, containing twenty-two of the songs previously recorded with his band in times past.

== Federal politics ==
Kenney attempted to enter politics in 1968 but lost the Liberal nomination in York North to Barney Danson who went on to serve as a cabinet minister under Pierre Trudeau.

== Family ==
Kenney had three children. In 1930 in Regina, he married Rosetta Smillie, and the couple had two sons, Martin and Jack, before Rosetta died in 1936. He subsequently married Madge, Rosetta's sister, although this marriage ended in divorce in the 1950s. In addition to instrumentalists, Kenney also featured numerous singers over the years, most notably Norma Locke, whom Kenney married in 1952 and who performed with Kenney from 1944 until his retirement in 1969. Norma, who died of cancer in 1990, was also instrumental in community affairs, having helped create the Mission Heritage Association, and being the driving force for the creation of the Fraser River Heritage Park.

Jason Kenney, Calgary Southeast Member of Parliament from 1997 to 2016, cabinet minister under Prime Minister Stephen Harper from 2006 to 2015, and Premier of Alberta 2019–2022, is Mart Kenney's grandson.

== Death and legacy ==
Kenney died on February 8, 2006, aged 95, following a lengthy battle with Alzheimer's and vascular dementia in Mission, British Columbia.

The District of Mission commemorated the contributions of the Kenneys by naming Kenney Avenue, which runs off Oyama Avenue near the Mission Sports Park, which is near their former home.

Kenney was added into the Alberta's grade 6 music curriculum draft in 2021, which credited him as the author of "When I Get Back to Calgary". Some expressed concerns regarding Kenney being one of only two examples of big band jazz and his relation to the then premier of Alberta, Jason Kenney.
