= Sladojevo Kopito =

- Village
- Location within Montenegro
- Coordinates: 42.528313°N 19.108627°E
- Country: Montenegro
- Municipality: Danilovgrad

Population (2011)
  - Total: 654
- Time zone: UTC+1 (CET)
  - Summer (DST): UTC+2 (CEST)

Sladojevo Kopito (Montenegrin Cyrillic: Сладојево Копито) is a village in the municipality of Danilovgrad, Montenegro. It is located just south of Danilovgrad.

== Demographics ==
According to the 2011 census, its population was 654.

Ethnicity in 2011
| Ethnicity | Number | Percentage |
|---|---|---|
| Montenegrins | 402 | 61.5% |
| Serbs | 241 | 36.9% |
| other/undeclared | 11 | 1.7% |
| Total | 654 | 100% |
