= Pitome Loze =

Pitome Loze Питоме Лозе
- Village
- Location within Montenegro
- Coordinates: 42.509899°N 19.155016°E
- Country: Montenegro
- Municipality: Danilovgrad

Population (2011)
  - Total: 529
- Time zone: UTC+1 (CET)
  - Summer (DST): UTC+2 (CEST)

Pitome Loze (Montenegrin Cyrillic: Питоме Лозе) is a village in the municipality of Danilovgrad, Montenegro.

== Demographics ==
According to the 2011 census, its population was 529.

Ethnicity in 2011
Ethnicity	Number	Percentage
Montenegrins	333	62.9%
Serbs	148	28.0%
other/undeclared	48	9.1%
Total	529	100%
