= Begovina, Danilovgrad =

Begovina Беговина
- Village
- Location within Montenegro
- Coordinates: 42.514037°N 19.135332°E
- Country: Montenegro
- Municipality: Danilovgrad

Population (2011)
  - Total: 284
- Time zone: UTC+1 (CET)
  - Summer (DST): UTC+2 (CEST)

Begovina (Montenegrin Cyrillic: Беговина) is a village in the municipality of Danilovgrad, Montenegro.

== Demographics ==
According to the 2011 census, its population was 284.

Ethnicity in 2011
Ethnicity	Number	Percentage
Montenegrins	189	66.5%
Serbs	78	27.5%
other/undeclared	17	6.0%
Total	284	100%
