= Kopito, Danilovgrad =

Kopito Копито
- Village
- Location within Montenegro
- Coordinates: 42.544415°N 19.136729°E
- Country: Montenegro
- Municipality: Danilovgrad

Population (2011)
  - Total: 204
- Time zone: UTC+1 (CET)
  - Summer (DST): UTC+2 (CEST)

Kopito (Montenegrin Cyrillic: Копито) is a village in the municipality of Danilovgrad, Montenegro.

== Demographics ==
According to the 2011 census, its population was 204.

Ethnicity in 2011
Ethnicity	Number	Percentage
Montenegrins	147	72.1%
Serbs	45	22.1%
other/undeclared	12	5.9%
Total	204	100%
