= Viš =

Viš Виш
- Village
- Location within Montenegro
- Coordinates: 42.611352°N 19.060878°E
- Country: Montenegro
- Municipality: Danilovgrad

Population (2011)
  - Total: 125
- Time zone: UTC+1 (CET)
  - Summer (DST): UTC+2 (CEST)

Viš (Montenegrin Cyrillic: Виш) is a small village in the municipality of Danilovgrad, Montenegro.

== Demographics ==
According to the 2011 census, its population was 125.

Ethnicity in 2011
Ethnicity	Number	Percentage
Montenegrins	82	65.6%
Serbs	39	31.2%
other/undeclared	4	3.2%
Total	125	100%
