= Utility aircraft =

General-purpose light aircraft

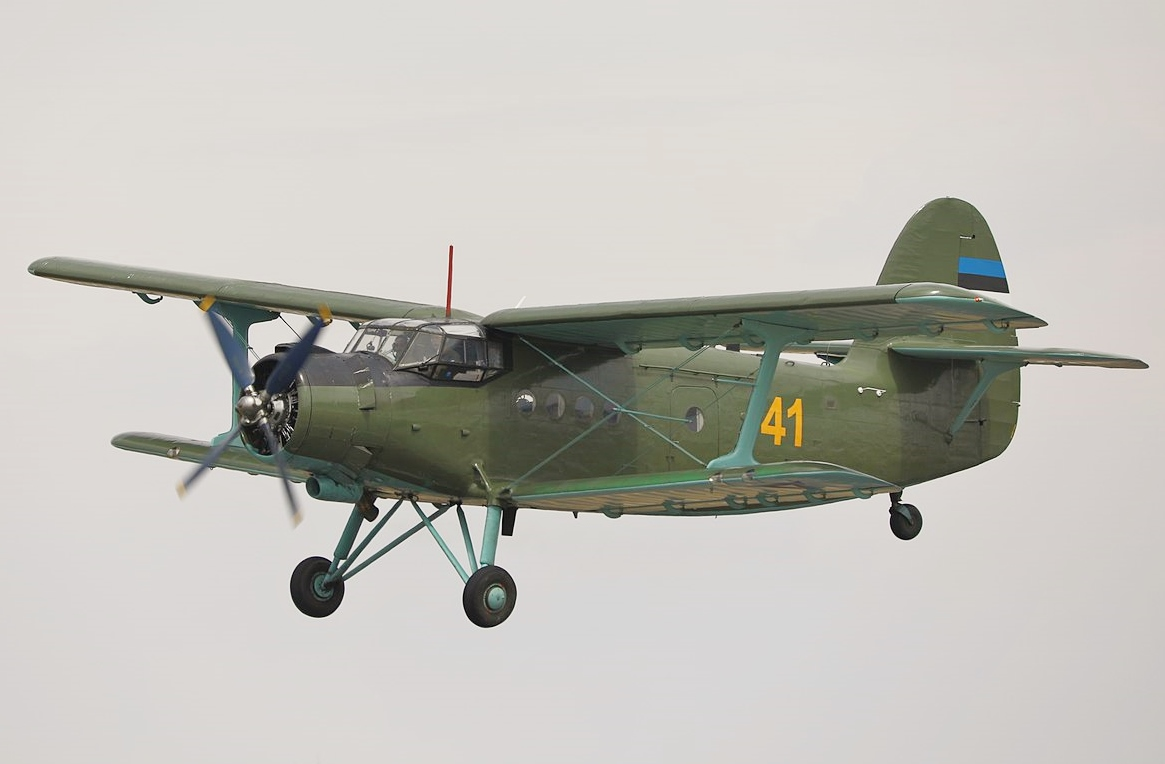
Antonov An-2, a widely used utility aircraft

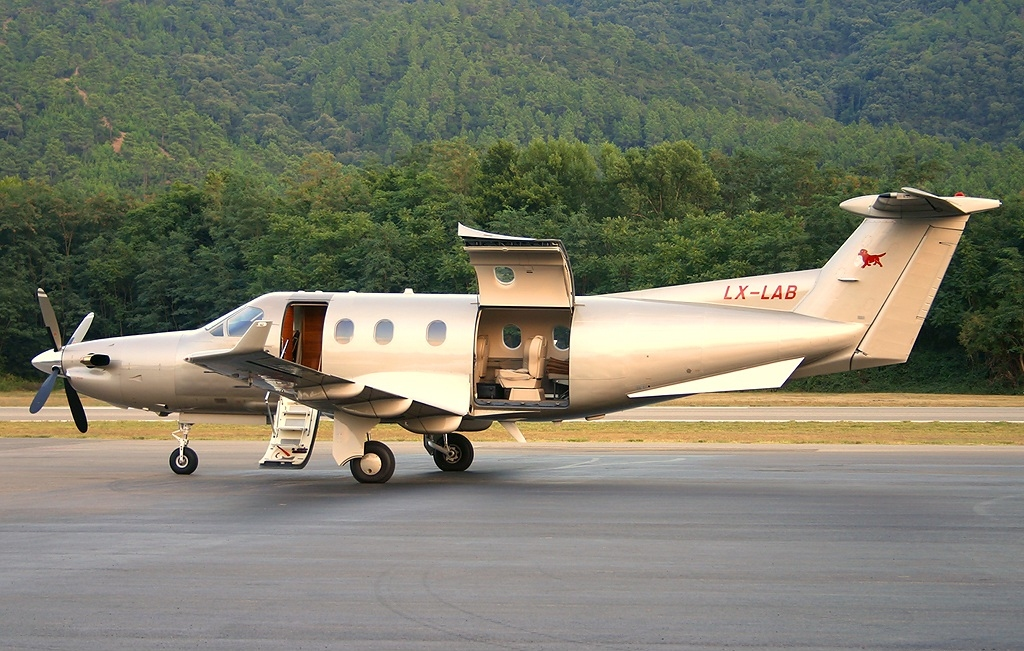
Pilatus PC-12 utility turboprop aircraft

A utility aircraft is a general-purpose light airplane or helicopter, usually used for transporting people, freight, or other supplies, but also used for other duties when more specialized aircraft are not required or available.

The term can also refer to an aircraft type certificated under American, Canadian, European, or Australian regulations as a Utility Category Aircraft, which indicates that it is permitted to conduct limited aerobatics. The approved maneuvers include chandelles, lazy eights, spins, and steep turns over 60° of bank.

In the United States, military utility aircraft are given the prefix U in their designations.

== See also ==
- FAR Part 23 (refers to "utility category" in United States aviation regulations)
- List of United States Tri-Service aircraft designations § U: Utility
- Utility helicopter
- Angel Flight
