= Jastreb, Montenegro =

Jastreb Јастреб
- Village
- Location within Montenegro
- Coordinates: 42.527424°N 19.135970°E
- Country: Montenegro
- Municipality: Danilovgrad

Population (2011)
  - Total: 303
- Time zone: UTC+1 (CET)
  - Summer (DST): UTC+2 (CEST)

Jastreb (Montenegrin Cyrillic: Јастреб) is a village in the municipality of Danilovgrad, Montenegro. It is located along the road from Podgorica to Danilovgrad.

== Demographics ==
According to the 2011 census, its population was 303.

Ethnicity in 2011
Ethnicity	Number	Percentage
Montenegrins	162	53.5%
Serbs	112	37.0%
other/undeclared	29	9.6%
Total	303	100%
