= Donji Martinići =

Donji Martinići Доњи Мартинићи
- Village
- Location within Montenegro
- Coordinates: 42.539143°N 19.180410°E
- Country: Montenegro
- Municipality: Danilovgrad

Population (2011)
  - Total: 387
- Time zone: UTC+1 (CET)
  - Summer (DST): UTC+2 (CEST)

Donji Martinići (Montenegrin Cyrillic: Доњи Мартинићи) is a village in the municipality of Danilovgrad, Montenegro.

== Demographics ==
According to the 2011 census, its population was 387.

Ethnicity in 2011
Ethnicity	Number	Percentage
Montenegrins	212	54.8%
Serbs	134	34.6%
other/undeclared	41	10.6%
Total	387	100%
