= Steep turn (aviation) =

Aviation turn involving more than 30 degrees

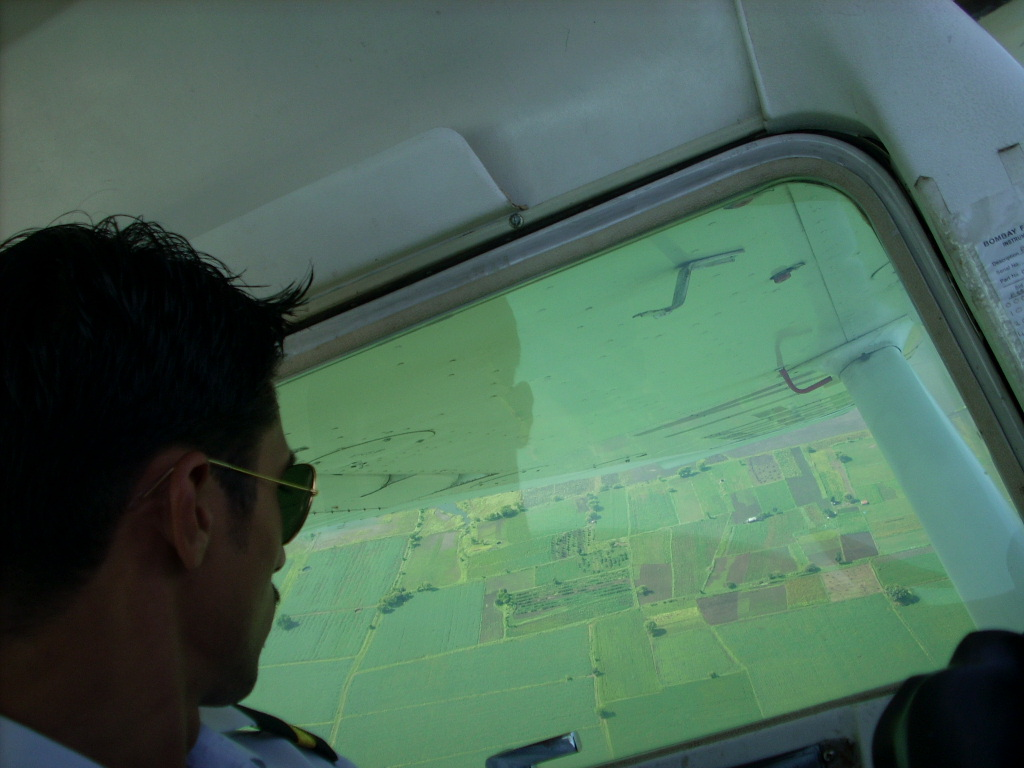
A pilot in a Cessna 152 performing a steep turn as seen from the cockpit. Notice how the wing is heavily banked.

A steep turn in aviation, performed by an aircraft (usually fixed wing), is a turn that involves a bank of more than 30 degrees. This means the angle created by the axis running along both wings and the horizon is more than 30 degrees. Generally, for training purposes, steep turns are demonstrated and practiced at 45 degrees, sometimes more. The purpose of learning and practicing a steep turn is to train a pilot to maintain control of an aircraft in cases of emergency such as structural damage, loss of power in one engine etc.

Entry procedure for a steep turn involves putting the aircraft into a bank (left or right), simultaneously increasing the thrust adequately to maintain altitude and airspeed, while pulling back on the flight stick or flight yoke to initiate the turn. For Jet training an increase of 7-8% of N1 caters. While doing this the pilot has to ensure no loss or gain of altitude. The pilot is expected to constantly look outside the aircraft while keeping a close check on the Attitude indicator for angle of bank. When the aircraft is in a 45 degree bank, it is common for a certain amount of opposite aileron control to be required to prevent the aircraft from slipping into a steeper bank.

== Tolerances and technicalities ==
For purposes of testing, a steep turn is a 360 degree turn in either direction with a 45 degree bank angle while maintaining altitude, speed and bank within certain set tolerances. Furthermore, the roll out heading must be within 10 degrees of the entry heading for the manoeuvre to be deemed successful by most flight training standards and check rides.

A steep turn increases the load factor of an aircraft. Simply put the aircraft feels heavier due to the effect of centrifugal force. At a 45 degree bank angle the load factor of an aircraft is 1.4 i.e. the aircraft effectively becomes 40% heavier. As in any level turn the pilot needs to exert backward pressure on the flight stick or column to increase wings' angle of attack, thereby creating more lift to execute the turn in addition to maintaining altitude. In the event that insufficient backward pressure is exerted on the stick / column, the aircraft will tend to lose altitude. This increase in the lift required also generates what is referred to as lift induced drag which without increased power, means the aircraft will lose speed. The rudder should never be used for controlling the pitch or vertical speed while performing the maneuver. The rudder should only be applied to maintain coordinated flight as indicated by the turn coordinator. Any other use of rudder may result in slip or, worse, skid and may cause stall or possibly spin.

== Parallax error based on pilot seat position ==
This applies to cockpits with two seats (usually pilot and co-pilot) arranged horizontally or abreast. Assuming the pilot performing the manoeuvre is positioned in the left seat (command seat) when a steep turn to the right is performed, the nose will appear to fall. Conversely, a steep turn to the left will make it seem like the nose is rising against the horizon. This is parallax error based purely on the pilot's vantage point and instinctively causes a pull back or a push down reaction on the control stick / column which is an incorrect reaction. A good way of eliminating the effect of this error is to keep an eye on the horizon and maintain the aircraft's position relative to the horizon line thereby allowing you to approximate the 45 degree angle the panel top creates against the horizon.
