= Danilovgrad Municipality =

Danilovgrad Municipality Opština Danilovgrad Општина Даниловград
- Municipality
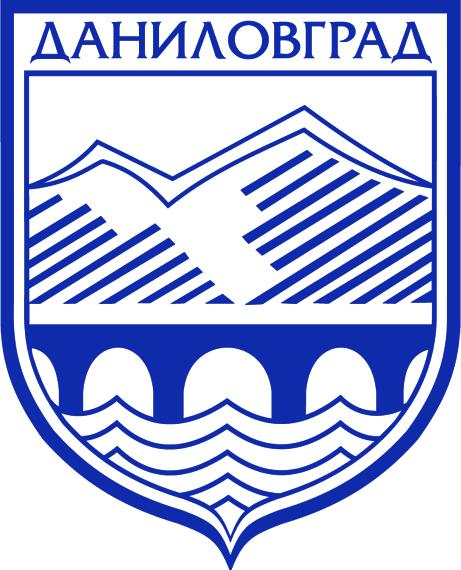
- Coat of arms

- Danilovgrad Municipality in Montenegro
- Country: Montenegro
- Seat: Danilovgrad

Area
  - Total: 501 km^{2} (193 sq mi)
- Postal code: 81410
- Area code: +382 20
- ISO 3166-2 code: ME-07
- Car plates: DG
- Climate: Cfa
- Website: danilovgrad.me

The Danilovgrad Municipality is one of the municipalities of Montenegro. Its administrative center is the town of Danilovgrad and it is located in the central part of Montenegro, in the valley of the Zeta river, also called the Bjelopavlići plain.

== Tourism and location ==
Main tourist attraction within the Danilovgrad municipality is Ostrog Monastery, a famous orthodox pilgrimage site visited by believers from afar. It is located on an almost vertical cliff overseeing the Bjelopavlići plain, approximately 15 km (9.3 mi) from Danilovgrad, in the direction of Nikšić. Other notable sites of interest are the Ždrebaonik Monastery and the well of Glava Zete. The Municipality lies along the main route between Montenegro's two largest cities, Podgorica and Nikšić. Via villages, Danilovgrad forms part of a conurbation with Podgorica.

=== City Assembly (2022–2026) ===
Party/Coalition	Seats	Local government
PES	8 / 33	Government
DPS	7 / 33	Opposition
ZBCG (NSD–DNP)	5 / 33	Government
DCG	4 / 33	Government
SD	2 / 33	Opposition
URA	2 / 33	Government
SNP	1 / 33	Government
SDP	1 / 33	Opposition
UCG	1 / 33	Government
PzP	1 / 33	Government
PZDG	1 / 33	Opposition

=== Subdivisions ===
There are 103 settlements in the territory:

- Bare Šumanovića
- Begovina
- Bileća
- Boan Kadića
- Bobulja
- Bogićevići
- Boronjina
- Braćani
- Brajovići
- Brijestovo
- Ćurčići
- Ćurilac
- Dabojevići
- Daljam
- Danilovgrad
- Đeđezi
- Do Pješivački
- Dolovi
- Donje Selo
- Donji Martinići
- Donji Rsojevići
- Drakovići
- Đuričkovići
- Frutak
- Glava Zete
- Glavica
- Glizica
- Gorica
- Gornji Martinići
- Gornji Rsojevići
- Gostilje Brajovićko
- Gostilje Martinićko
- Gradina
- Grbe
- Grlić
- Gruda
- Grudice
- Jabuke
- Jastreb
- Jelenak
- Jovanovići
- Klikovače
- Kopito
- Kosić
- Krivače
- Kruščica
- Kujava
- Kupinovo
- Lalevići
- Lazarev Krst
- Livade
- Lubovo
- Mala Zagreda
- Malenza
- Mandići
- Međeđe I
- Međeđe II
- Međice
- Mijokusovići
- Miogost
- Mokanje
- Mosori
- Musterovići
- Novo Selo
- Orašje
- Orja Luka
- Pažići
- Pitome Loze
- Plana
- Počijevka
- Podglavica
- Podvraće
- Poljica
- Potkraj
- Potkula
- Potočilo
- Povrhpoljina
- Požar
- Rošca
- Rova
- Ržišta
- Sabov krug
- Sekulići
- Sladojevo Kopito
- Slap
- Slatina
- Šobaići
- Spuž
- Sretnja
- Strahinići
- Studeno
- Šume
- Tvorilo
- Veleta
- Velika Zagreda
- Velje Polje
- Vinići
- Viš
- Vučica
- Zagorak
- Župa

== Demographics ==
According to the 2023 census, the municipality of Danilovgrad had a population of 18,617, with the following ethnic and religious composition:

Ethnic groups (2023 census)
Montenegrins	57.31%
Serbs	35.39%
Others	3.86%
Undeclared	3.44%

Religion (2023 census)
Eastern Orthodox	93.09%
Islam	1.61%
Roman Catholic	0.74%
Atheist	1.43%
Others	0.96%
Undeclared	2.23%

== Gallery ==
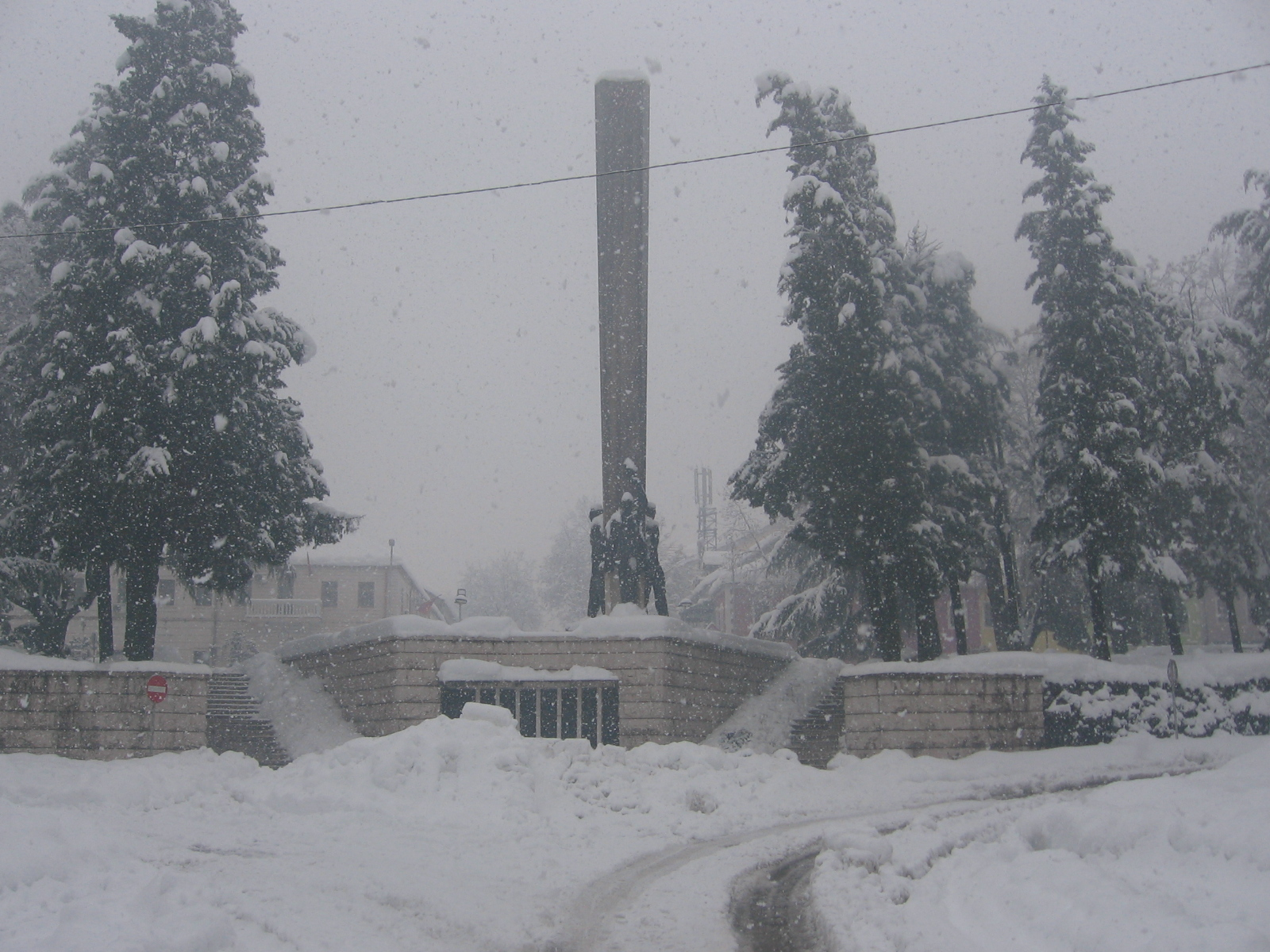
World War II monument

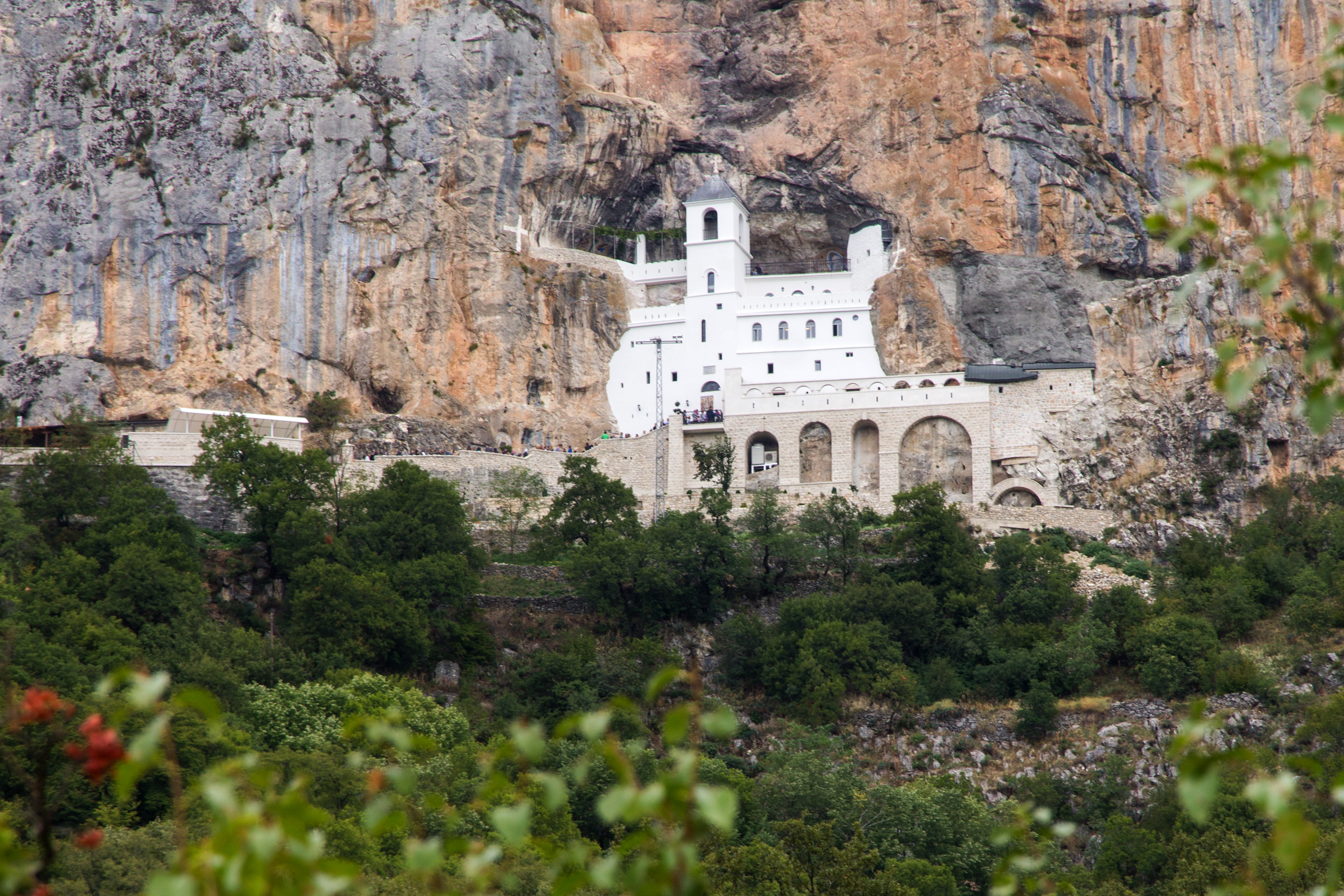
Ostrog Monastery

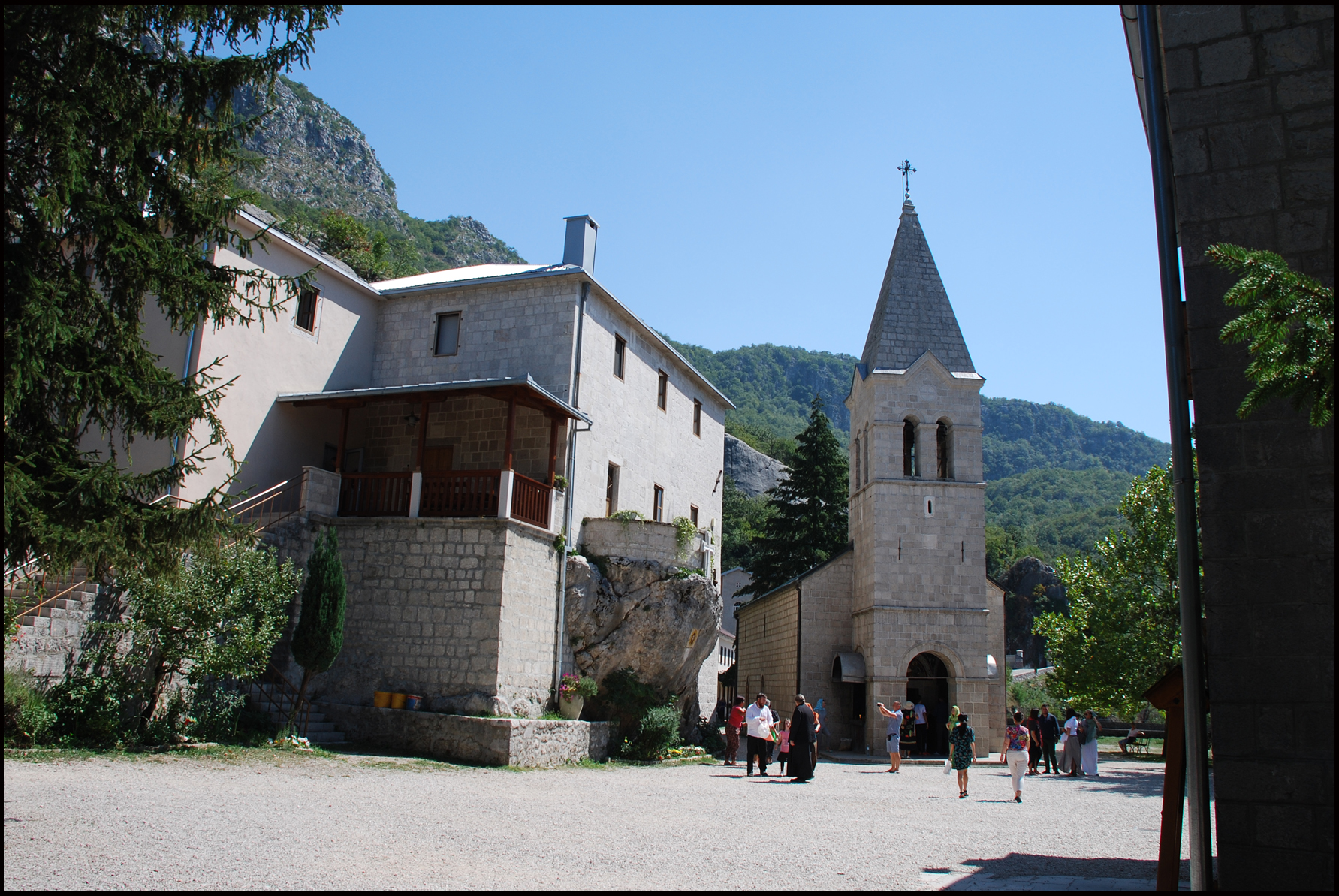
Holy Trinity Church

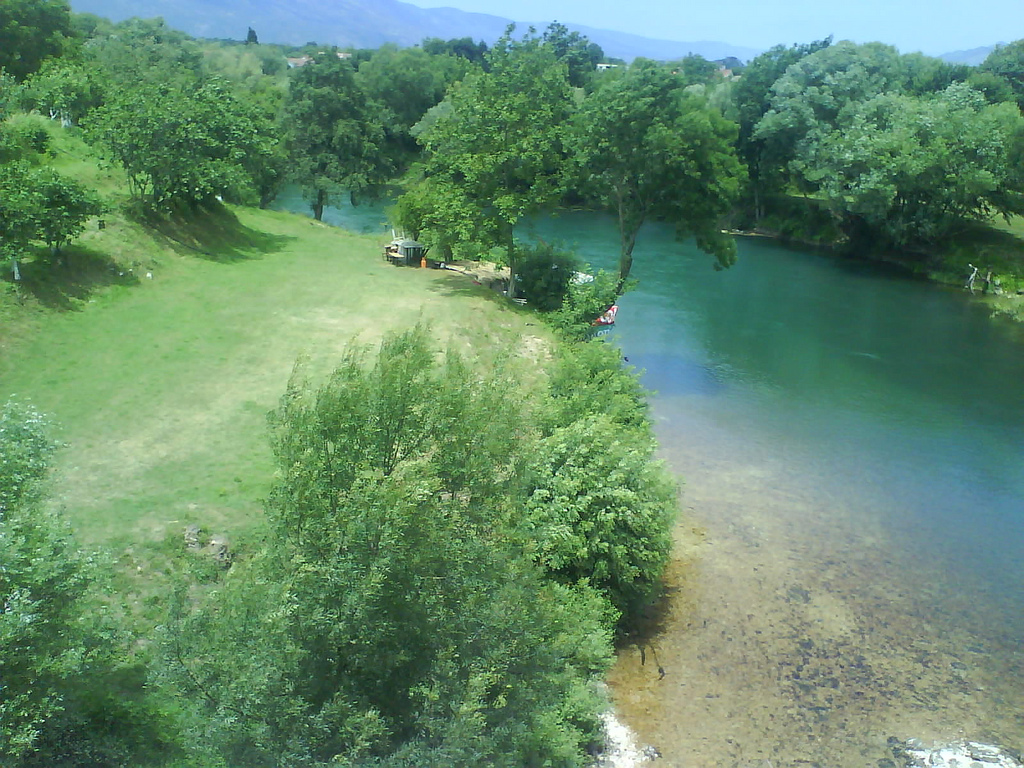
Zeta river near Spuž
