= List of Leuctra species =

This is a list of 212 species in Leuctra, a genus of rolled-winged stoneflies in the family Leuctridae.

== Leuctra species ==
- Leuctra aculeata Zwick, P., 1982^{c g}
- Leuctra aegaeica Pardo & P. Zwick, 1993^{c g}
- Leuctra alabama James, 1974^{i c g}
- Leuctra albida Kempny, 1899^{c g}
- Leuctra alexanderi Hanson, 1941^{i c g}
- Leuctra alosi Navás, 1919^{c g}
- Leuctra alpina Kühtreiber, 1934^{c g}
- Leuctra alta James, 1974^{i c g}
- Leuctra alticola Despax, 1929^{c g}
- Leuctra ameliae Vinçon & Ravizza, 1996^{c g}
- Leuctra anatolica Kazanci, 1986^{c g}
- Leuctra andalusiaca Aubert, 1962^{c g}
- Leuctra annae Consiglio, 1975^{c g}
- Leuctra antalyana Vinçon & Sivec, 2001^{c g}
- Leuctra apenninicola Ravizza, C., 1988^{c g}
- Leuctra aptera Kacanski & P. Zwick, 1970^{c g}
- Leuctra archimedis Consiglio, 1968^{c g}
- Leuctra ariega Pardo & Vinçon, 1995^{c g}
- Leuctra armata Kempny, 1899^{c g}
- Leuctra artvinensis Vinçon & Sivec, 2001^{c g}
- Leuctra aspoeckorum Theischinger, 1976^{c g}
- Leuctra astridae Graf, 2005^{c g}
- Leuctra auberti Ravizza, C. & Ravizza Dematteis, 1985^{c g}
- Leuctra auriensis Membiela, 1989^{c g}
- Leuctra aurita Navás, 1919^{c g}
- Leuctra austriaca Aubert, 1954^{c g}
- Leuctra autumnalis Aubert, 1948^{c g}
- Leuctra baddecka Ricker, 1965^{i c g}
- Leuctra balcanica Raušer, 1965^{c g}
- Leuctra balearica Pardo & P. Zwick, 1993^{c g}
- Leuctra berthelemyi Zwick, P. & Vinçon, 1993^{c g}
- Leuctra besucheti Aubert, 1962^{c g}
- Leuctra bidula Aubert, 1962^{c g}
- Leuctra biloba Claassen, 1923^{i c g}
- Leuctra boluensis Kazanci, 1999^{c g}
- Leuctra boreoni Aubert, 1962^{c g}
- Leuctra bozi Vinçon & Sivec, 2001^{c g}
- Leuctra brachyptera Kazanci, 1985^{c g}
- Leuctra braueri Kempny, 1898^{c g}
- Leuctra brevipennis Ravizza, C., 1978^{c g}
- Leuctra bronislawi Sowa, 1970^{c g}
- Leuctra brunnea Provancher, 1878^{c}
- Leuctra budtzi Esben-Petersen, 1912^{c g}
- Leuctra canavensis Ravizza, C. & Ravizza Dematteis, 1992^{c g}
- Leuctra candiae Zwick, P., 1978^{c g}
- Leuctra caprai Festa, 1939^{c g}
- Leuctra carolinensis Claassen, 1923^{i c g}
- Leuctra carpathica Kis, 1966^{c g}
- Leuctra castillana Aubert, 1956^{c g}
- Leuctra cazorlana Aubert, 1962^{c g}
- Leuctra cedrus Vinçon, Dia & Sivec, 2014^{c g}
- Leuctra cingulata Kempny, 1899^{c g}
- Leuctra clerguae Vinçon & Pardo, 1994^{c g}
- Leuctra colemanorum Harrison, A.B. & Stark, 2010^{c g}
- Leuctra collaris Martynov, 1928^{c g}
- Leuctra concii Consiglio, 1958^{c g}
- Leuctra costai Aubert, 1953^{c g}
- Leuctra cottaquilla James, 1974^{i c g}
- Leuctra cretica Zwick, P., 1978^{c g}
- Leuctra crimeana Zhiltzova, 1967^{c g}
- Leuctra crossi James, 1974^{i c g}
- Leuctra cypria Zwick, P., 1978^{c g}
- Leuctra cyrnea Consiglio & Giudicelli, 1965^{c g}
- Leuctra dalmoni Vinçon & Murányi, 2007^{c g}
- Leuctra delamellata Zhiltzova, 1960^{c g}
- Leuctra delmastroi Vinçon, 2012^{g}
- Leuctra dentiloba Wu, C.F., 1973^{c g}
- Leuctra despaxi Mosely, 1930^{c g}
- Leuctra digitata Kempny, 1899^{c g}
- Leuctra dispinata Balinsky, 1950^{c g}
- Leuctra dissimilis Zhiltzova, 1960^{c g}
- Leuctra dolasilla Consiglio, 1955^{c g}
- Leuctra duplicata Claassen, 1923^{i c g b} (Atlantic needlefly)
- Leuctra dylani Graf, 2007^{c g}
- Leuctra elisabethae Ravizza, C., 1985^{c g}
- Leuctra espanoli Aubert, 1956^{c g}
- Leuctra estrela Aubert, 1962^{c g}
- Leuctra ferruginea (Walker, 1851)^{i c g b} (eastern needlefly)
- Leuctra festai Aubert, 1954^{c g}
- Leuctra flavicornis (Pictet, F.J., 1836)^{c g}
- Leuctra flavomaculata Mosely, 1935^{c g}
- Leuctra franzi Aubert, 1956^{c g}
- Leuctra fraterna Morton, 1930^{c g}
- Leuctra furcatella Martynov, 1928^{c g}
- Leuctra fusca (Linnaeus, 1758)^{i c g}
- Leuctra gallaeca Membiela, 1989^{c g}
- Leuctra gallica Aubert, 1953^{c g}
- Leuctra gardinii Ravizza, C., 2005^{c g}
- Leuctra garumna Vinçon & Ravizza, 1996^{c g}
- Leuctra geniculata Stephens, 1836^{c g}
- Leuctra graeca Zwick, P., 1978^{c g}
- Leuctra grandis Banks, 1906^{i c g}
- Leuctra handlirschi Kempny, 1898^{c g}
- Leuctra hansmalickyi Graf, 2010^{c g}
- Leuctra helenae Braasch, 1972^{c g}
- Leuctra helvetica Aubert, 1956^{c g}
- Leuctra hexacantha Despax, 1940^{c g}
- Leuctra hexacanthoides Zwick, P. & Vinçon, 1993^{c g}
- Leuctra hiberiaca Aubert, 1956^{c g}
- Leuctra hicksi Harrison, A.B. & Stark, 2010^{c g}
- Leuctra hippopoides Kacanski & P. Zwick, 1970^{c g}
- Leuctra hippopus Kempny, 1899^{c g}
- Leuctra hirsuta Bogoescu & Tabacaru, 1960^{c g}
- Leuctra hispanica Aubert, 1952^{c g}
- Leuctra holzschuhi Theischinger, 1976^{c g}
- Leuctra iliberis Sánchez-Ortega & Alba-Tercedor, 1988^{c g}
- Leuctra illiesi Aubert, 1956^{c g}
- Leuctra inermis Kempny, 1899^{i c g}
- Leuctra insubrica Aubert, 1949^{c g}
- Leuctra istenicae Sivec, 1982^{c g}
- Leuctra jahorinensis Kacanski, 1972^{g}
- Leuctra joani Vinçon & Pardo, 1994^{c g}
- Leuctra joosti Braasch, 1970^{c g}
- Leuctra juliettae Vinçon & Graf, 2011^{c g}
- Leuctra karcali Vinçon & Sivec, 2001^{c g}
- Leuctra kazanciae Murányi & Vinçon, 2017^{c g}
- Leuctra kempnyi Mosely, 1932^{c g}
- Leuctra ketamensis Sánchez-Ortega & Azzouz, 1997^{c g}
- Leuctra khroumiriensis Vinçon & Pardo, 1998^{c g}
- Leuctra klapperichi Murányi, 2005^{c g}
- Leuctra kopetdaghi Zhiltzova, 1972^{c g}
- Leuctra kumanskii Braasch & Joost, 1977^{c g}
- Leuctra kurui Kazanci, 1983^{c g}
- Leuctra kykladica Pardo & P. Zwick, 1993^{c g}
- Leuctra lamellosa Despax, 1929^{c g}
- Leuctra laura Hitchcock, 1969^{i c g b} (Hampshire needlefly)
- Leuctra leptogaster Aubert, 1949^{c g}
- Leuctra ligurica Aubert, 1962^{c g}
- Leuctra madritensis Aubert, 1952^{c g}
- Leuctra major Brinck, 1949^{c g}
- Leuctra malcor Murányi, 2007^{c g}
- Leuctra malickyi Braasch & Joost, 1976^{c g}
- Leuctra marani Raušer, 1965^{c g}
- Leuctra maria Hanson, 1941^{i c g}
- Leuctra marilouae Vinçon & Sivec, 2001^{c g}
- Leuctra marinettae Ravizza, C. & Vinçon, 1989^{c g}
- Leuctra maroccana Aubert, 1956^{c g}
- Leuctra martynovi Zhiltzova, 1960^{c g}
- Leuctra medjerdensis Vinçon & Pardo, 1998^{c g}
- Leuctra meridionalis Aubert, 1951^{c g}
- Leuctra metsovonica Aubert, 1956^{c g}
- Leuctra meyi Braasch, 1981^{c g}
- Leuctra microstyla Vinçon & Ravizza, 2000^{c g}
- Leuctra minoica Pardo & P. Zwick, 1993^{c g}
- Leuctra minuta Zhiltzova, 1960^{c g}
- Leuctra mitchellensis Hanson, 1941^{i c g}
- Leuctra moha Ricker, 1952^{i c g}
- Leuctra monticola Hanson, 1941^{i c g}
- Leuctra moreae Zwick, P., 1978^{c g}
- Leuctra mortoni Kempny, 1899^{c g}
- Leuctra moselyi Morton, 1907^{i c g}
- Leuctra muranyii Vinçon & Graf, 2011^{c g}
- Leuctra nephophila Hanson, 1941^{i c g}
- Leuctra nigra (Olivier, 1811)^{c g}
- Leuctra niveola Schmid, 1947^{c g}
- Leuctra occitana Despax, 1930^{c g}
- Leuctra olympia Aubert, 1956^{c g}
- Leuctra paleo Poulton and Stewart, 1991^{i c g}
- Leuctra pasquinii Consiglio, 1958^{c g}
- Leuctra picteti Sinitshenkova, 1987^{c g}
- Leuctra pinhoti Grubbs & Sheldon, 2009^{c g}
- Leuctra prima Kempny, 1899^{c g}
- Leuctra pseudocingulata Mendl, H., 1968^{c g}
- Leuctra pseudocylindrica Despax, 1929^{c g}
- Leuctra pseudohippopus Raušer, 1965^{c g}
- Leuctra pseudorosinae Aubert, 1954^{c g}
- Leuctra pseudosignifera Aubert, 1954^{c g}
- Leuctra pusilla Krno, 1985^{c g}
- Leuctra quadrimaculata Kis, 1963^{c g}
- Leuctra queyrassiana Ravizza, C. & Vinçon, 1991^{c g}
- Leuctra rauscheri Aubert, 1957^{c g}
- Leuctra ravizzai Ravizza Dematteis & Vinçon, 1994^{c g}
- Leuctra rhodoica Pardo & P. Zwick, 1993^{c g}
- Leuctra rickeri James, 1976^{i c g}
- Leuctra rosinae Kempny, 1900^{c g}
- Leuctra sanainica Zhiltzova, 1960^{c g}
- Leuctra sartorii Vinçon & Pardo, 1998^{c g}
- Leuctra schistocerca Zwick, P., 1971^{c g}
- Leuctra schmidi Aubert, 1946^{c g}
- Leuctra schusteri Grubbs, 2015^{c g}
- Leuctra sesvenna Aubert, 1953^{c g}
- Leuctra sibleyi Claassen, 1923^{i c g b} (brook needlefly)
- Leuctra signifera Kempny, 1899^{c g}
- Leuctra silana Aubert, 1953^{c g}
- Leuctra simplex Zhiltzova, 1960^{c g}
- Leuctra sipahilerae Vinçon & Sivec, 2001^{c g}
- Leuctra stupeningi Illies, 1954^{c g}
- Leuctra subalpina Vinçon, C. Ravizza & Aubert, 1995^{c g}
- Leuctra svanetica Zhiltzova, 1960^{c g}
- Leuctra szczytkoi Stark and Stewart, 1981^{i c g}
- Leuctra tarnogradskii Martynov, 1928^{c g}
- Leuctra tenella Provancher, 1878^{i c g b} (broad-lobed needlefly)
- Leuctra tenuis (Pictet, 1841)^{i c g b} (narrow-lobed needlefly)
- Leuctra tergostyla Wu, C.F., 1973^{c g}
- Leuctra teriolensis Kempny, 1900^{c g}
- Leuctra theischingeri Vinçon & Sivec, 2001^{c g}
- Leuctra thomasi Zwick, P. & Vinçon, 1993^{c g}
- Leuctra torrenticola Zhiltzova, 1960^{c g}
- Leuctra transsylvanica Kis, 1964^{c g}
- Leuctra triloba Claassen, 1923^{i c g}
- Leuctra truncata Claassen, 1923^{i c g b} (truncate needlefly)
- Leuctra tunisica Pardo & P. Zwick, 1993^{c g}
- Leuctra uncinata Martynov, 1928^{c g}
- Leuctra usdi Grubbs, 2010^{c g}
- Leuctra vaillanti Aubert, 1956^{c g}
- Leuctra variabilis Hanson, 1941^{i c g b} (variable needlefly)
- Leuctra vesulensis Ravizza, C. & Ravizza Dematteis, 1984^{c g}
- Leuctra vinconi Ravizza, C. & Ravizza Dematteis, 1993^{c g}
- Leuctra visitor Murányi & Kovács, 2024 ^{c g}
- Leuctra wilmae Illies, 1954^{c g}
- Leuctra zangezurica Zhiltzova, 1960^{c g}
- Leuctra zhiltzovae Theischinger, 1976^{c g}
- Leuctra zwicki Ravizza, C. & Vinçon, 1991^{c g}

Data sources: i = ITIS, c = Catalogue of Life, g = GBIF, b = Bugguide.net
