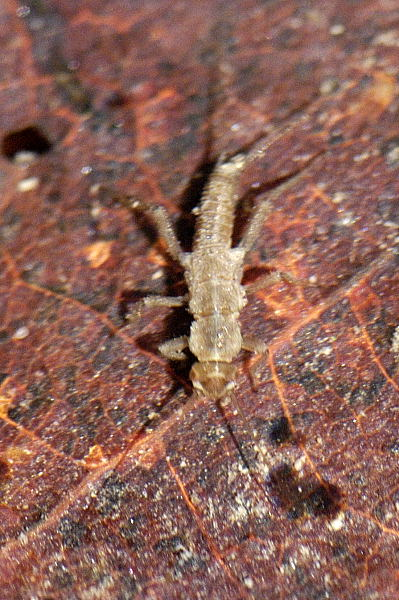

Scientific classification
- Domain: Eukaryota
- Kingdom: Animalia
- Phylum: Arthropoda
- Class: Insecta
- Order: Plecoptera
- Family: Leuctridae
- Genus: Leuctra
- Species: L. fusca

Binomial name
- Leuctra fusca (Linnaeus, 1758)

Synonyms
- Phryganea fusca Linnaeus, 1758

= Leuctra fusca =

Species of stonefly

Leuctra fusca is a species of stonefly belonging to the family Leuctridae.

It is native to Eurasia.

Three subspecies are recognised:

- Leuctra fusca fusca (Linnaeus, 1758)
- Leuctra fusca latior Berthélemy & Dia, 1982
- Leuctra fusca tergostyla Wu, 1973
