= Moselia infuscata =

Scientific classification
- Domain: Eukaryota
- Kingdom: Animalia
- Phylum: Arthropoda
- Class: Insecta
- Order: Plecoptera
- Family: Leuctridae
- Genus: Moselia
- Species: M. infuscata

Binomial name
- Moselia infuscata (Claassen, 1923)

Synonyms
- Leuctra infuscata Claassen, 1923

Species of stonefly

Moselia infuscata, the hairy needlefly, is a species of rolled-winged stonefly in the family Leuctridae. It is found in North America.
