= Paraleuctra alta =

Scientific classification
- Kingdom: Animalia
- Phylum: Arthropoda
- Clade: Pancrustacea
- Class: Insecta
- Order: Plecoptera
- Family: Leuctridae
- Genus: Paraleuctra
- Species: P. alta

Binomial name
- Paraleuctra alta (Baumann & Stark, 2009)

Species of stonefly

Paraleuctra alta, known commonly as the Alberta needlefly is a species of rolled-winged stonefly in the family Leuctridae. It is endemic to Alberta, Canada where it is found by the Berland River in Jasper National Park.
