= Paraleuctra vershina =

Scientific classification
- Domain: Eukaryota
- Kingdom: Animalia
- Phylum: Arthropoda
- Class: Insecta
- Order: Plecoptera
- Family: Leuctridae
- Genus: Paraleuctra
- Species: P. vershina

Binomial name
- Paraleuctra vershina Gaufin & Ricker, 1974

Species of stonefly

Paraleuctra vershina, the summit needlefly, is a species of rolled-winged stonefly in the family Leuctridae. It is found in North America.
