= Megaleuctra complicata =

Scientific classification
- Domain: Eukaryota
- Kingdom: Animalia
- Phylum: Arthropoda
- Class: Insecta
- Order: Plecoptera
- Family: Leuctridae
- Genus: Megaleuctra
- Species: M. complicata

Binomial name
- Megaleuctra complicata Claassen, 1937

Species of stonefly

Megaleuctra complicata, the Pacific needlefly, is a species of rolled-winged stonefly in the family Leuctridae. It is found in North America.
