= Leuctra sibleyi =

Scientific classification
- Kingdom: Animalia
- Phylum: Arthropoda
- Clade: Pancrustacea
- Class: Insecta
- Order: Plecoptera
- Family: Leuctridae
- Genus: Leuctra
- Species: L. sibleyi

Binomial name
- Leuctra sibleyi Claassen, 1923

Species of stonefly

Leuctra sibleyi, the brook needlefly, is a species of rolled-winged stonefly in the family Leuctridae. It is found in North America.
