= Leuctra ferruginea =

Scientific classification
- Domain: Eukaryota
- Kingdom: Animalia
- Phylum: Arthropoda
- Class: Insecta
- Order: Plecoptera
- Family: Leuctridae
- Genus: Leuctra
- Species: L. ferruginea

Binomial name
- Leuctra ferruginea (Walker, 1851)

Synonyms
- Leuctra decepta (Claassen, 1923)

Species of stonefly

Leuctra ferruginea, the eastern needlefly, is a species of rolled-winged stonefly in the family Leuctridae. It is found in North America.
