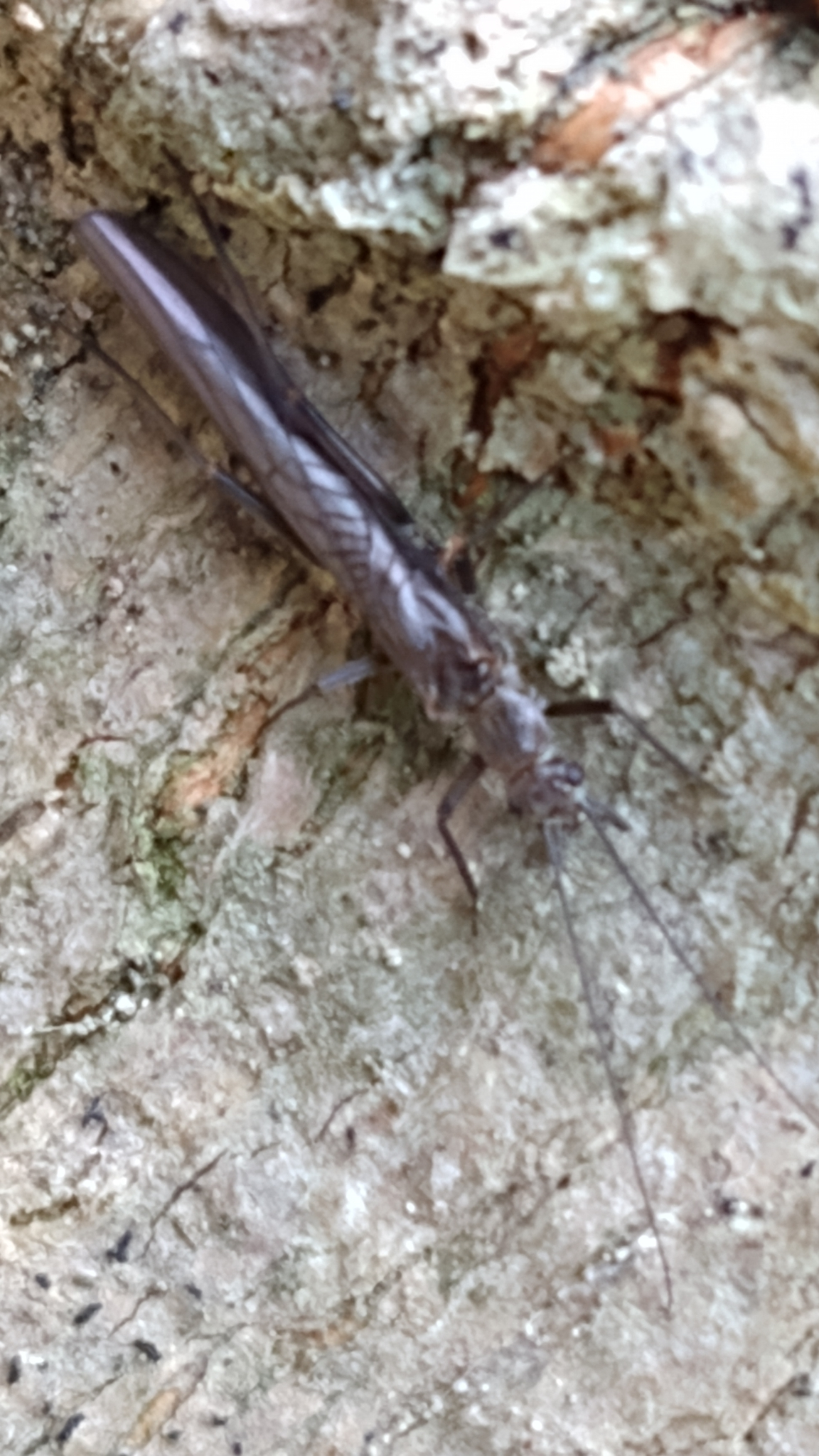

Scientific classification
- Domain: Eukaryota
- Kingdom: Animalia
- Phylum: Arthropoda
- Class: Insecta
- Order: Plecoptera
- Family: Leuctridae
- Genus: Paraleuctra
- Species: P. sara

Binomial name
- Paraleuctra sara (Claassen, 1937)

Synonyms
- Leuctra sara Claassen, 1937

= Paraleuctra sara =

Species of stonefly

Paraleuctra sara, the Appalachian needlefly, is a species of rolled-winged stonefly in the family Leuctridae. It is found in North America.
