= Leuctra variabilis =

Scientific classification
- Domain: Eukaryota
- Kingdom: Animalia
- Phylum: Arthropoda
- Class: Insecta
- Order: Plecoptera
- Family: Leuctridae
- Genus: Leuctra
- Species: L. variabilis

Binomial name
- Leuctra variabilis Hanson, 1941

Species of stonefly

Leuctra variabilis, the variable needlefly, is a species of rolled-winged stonefly in the family Leuctridae. It is found in North America.
