= Despaxia augusta =

Scientific classification
- Domain: Eukaryota
- Kingdom: Animalia
- Phylum: Arthropoda
- Class: Insecta
- Order: Plecoptera
- Family: Leuctridae
- Genus: Despaxia
- Species: D. augusta

Binomial name
- Despaxia augusta (Banks, 1907)

Synonyms
- Leuctra glabra Claassen, 1937

Species of stonefly

Despaxia augusta, known generally as the autumn needlefly or smooth needlefly, is a species of rolled-winged stonefly in the family Leuctridae. It is found in North America.
