= Leuctra visitor =

Scientific classification
- Kingdom: Animalia
- Phylum: Arthropoda
- Class: Insecta
- Order: Plecoptera
- Family: Leuctridae
- Genus: Leuctra
- Species: L. visitor

Binomial name
- Leuctra visitor Murányi & Kovács, 2024
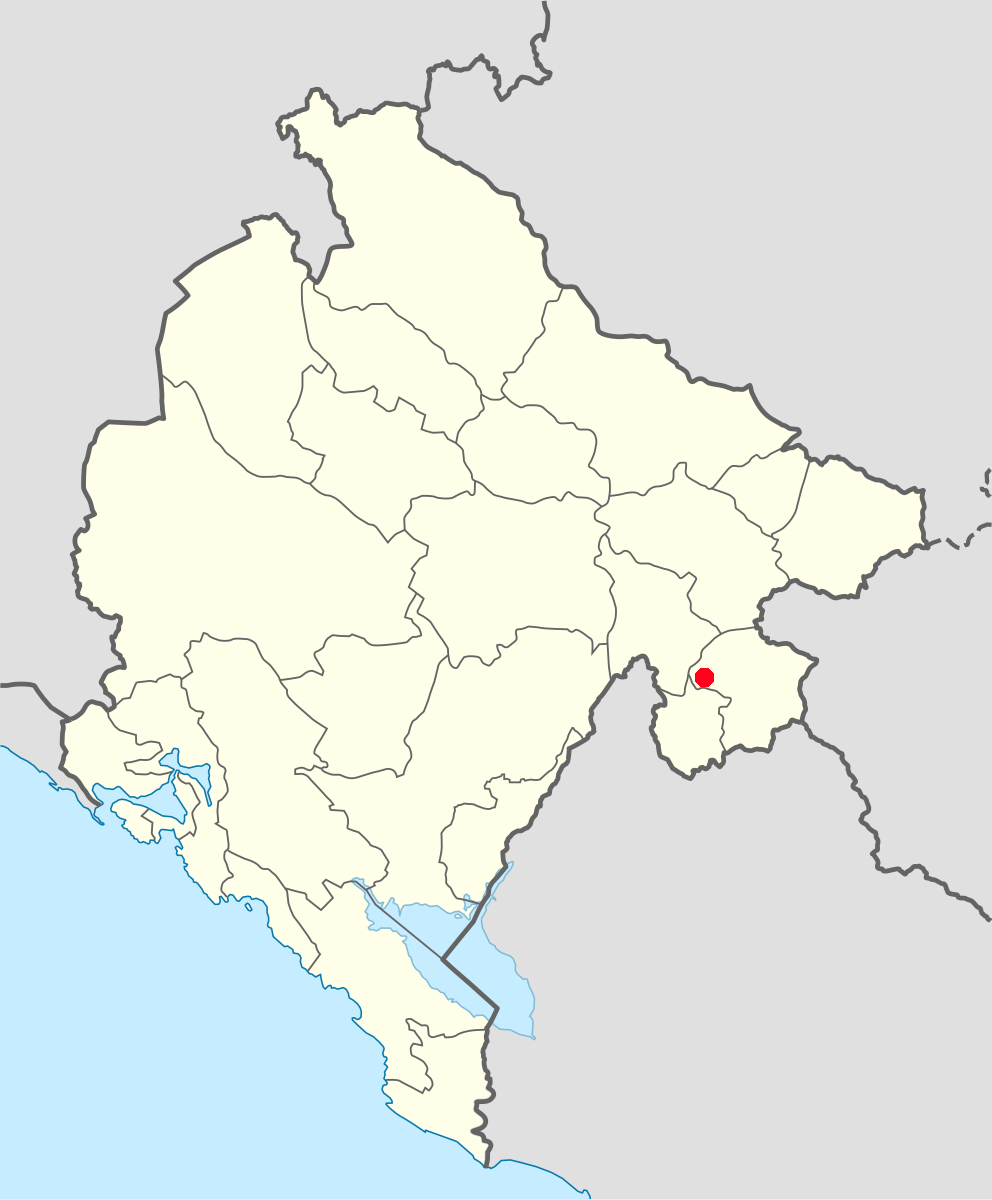

Species of stonefly

Leuctra visitor is a species of rolled-winged stonefly in the family Leuctridae. It is found in Montenegro.

== Distribution ==
Leuctra visitor is known only from Montenegro. Its habitat range is currently poorly described and known definitively only from the type locality on Visitor Mountain.

This species inhabits the forest springs and their outlet on the elevations of 1730-1845 meters above the sea level.
