= Leuctra tenuis =

Scientific classification
- Domain: Eukaryota
- Kingdom: Animalia
- Phylum: Arthropoda
- Class: Insecta
- Order: Plecoptera
- Family: Leuctridae
- Genus: Leuctra
- Species: L. tenuis

Binomial name
- Leuctra tenuis (Pictet, 1841)

Species of stonefly

Leuctra tenuis, the narrow-lobed needlefly, is a species of rolled-winged stonefly in the family Leuctridae. It is found in North America.
