= Paraleuctra =

Scientific classification
- Domain: Eukaryota
- Kingdom: Animalia
- Phylum: Arthropoda
- Class: Insecta
- Order: Plecoptera
- Family: Leuctridae
- Genus: Paraleuctra; Hanson, 1941

Genus of stoneflies

Paraleuctra is a genus of rolled-winged stoneflies in the family Leuctridae. There are more than 20 described species in Paraleuctra.

== Species ==
These 26 species belong to the genus Paraleuctra:

- Paraleuctra alta Baumann & Stark, 2009
- Paraleuctra ambulans Shimizu, 2000
- Paraleuctra angulata Shimizu, 2000
- Paraleuctra baei Murányi & Hwang, 2017
- Paraleuctra cercia (Okamoto, 1922)
- Paraleuctra cervicornis Du & Qian, 2012
- Paraleuctra concava Shimizu, 2000
- Paraleuctra divisa (Hitchcock, 1958)
- Paraleuctra ezoensis Shimizu, 2000
- Paraleuctra forcipata (Frison, 1937)
- Paraleuctra hokurikuensis Shimizu, 2000
- Paraleuctra jewetti Nebeker & Gaufin, 1966
- Paraleuctra malaisei Zwick, 2010
- Paraleuctra occidentalis (Banks, 1907)
- Paraleuctra okamotoa (Claassen, 1936)
- Paraleuctra orientalis (Chu, 1928)
- Paraleuctra paramalaisei Murányi & Hwang, 2017
- Paraleuctra projecta (Frison, 1942)
- Paraleuctra qilianshana Li & Yang, 2013
- Paraleuctra sara (Claassen, 1937) (Appalachian needlefly)
- Paraleuctra similis Shimizu, 2000
- Paraleuctra sinica Yang & Yang, 1995
- Paraleuctra tetraedra Harper, 1977
- Paraleuctra tianmushana Li & Yang, 2010
- Paraleuctra vershina Gaufin & Ricker, 1974 (summit needlefly)
- Paraleuctra zapekinae Zhiltzova, 1974
