= Moselia =

Scientific classification
- Domain: Eukaryota
- Kingdom: Animalia
- Phylum: Arthropoda
- Class: Insecta
- Order: Plecoptera
- Family: Leuctridae
- Genus: Moselia; Ricker, 1943

Genus of stoneflies

Moselia is a genus of rolled-winged stoneflies in the family Leuctridae. There are at least two described species in Moselia.

== Species ==
These two species belong to the genus Moselia:

- Moselia infuscata (Claassen, 1923) (hairy needlefly)
- Moselia zonata Stark & Harrison, 2016
