= Megaleuctra =

Scientific classification
- Domain: Eukaryota
- Kingdom: Animalia
- Phylum: Arthropoda
- Class: Insecta
- Order: Plecoptera
- Family: Leuctridae
- Genus: Megaleuctra; Neave, 1934

Genus of stoneflies

Megaleuctra is a genus of rolled-winged stoneflies in the family Leuctridae. There are about seven described species in Megaleuctra.

== Species ==
These seven species belong to the genus Megaleuctra:

- Megaleuctra complicata Claassen, 1937 (Pacific needlefly)
- Megaleuctra flinti Baumann, 1973
- Megaleuctra kincaidi Frison, 1942
- Megaleuctra saebat Ham & Bae, 2002
- Megaleuctra stigmata (Banks, 1900)
- Megaleuctra williamsae Hanson, 1941
- † Megaleuctra neavei Ricker, 1936
