= Despaxia =

Scientific classification
- Domain: Eukaryota
- Kingdom: Animalia
- Phylum: Arthropoda
- Class: Insecta
- Order: Plecoptera
- Family: Leuctridae
- Genus: Despaxia; Ricker, 1943

Genus of stoneflies

Despaxia is a genus of rolled-winged stoneflies in the family Leuctridae. There are at least two described species in Despaxia.

== Species ==
These two species belong to the genus Despaxia:

- Despaxia asiatica Zwick, 2010
- Despaxia augusta (Banks, 1907) (autumn needlefly)
