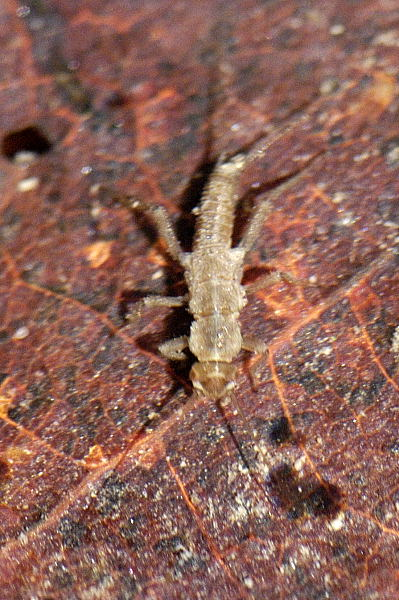
- Leuctra fusca

Scientific classification
- Domain: Eukaryota
- Kingdom: Animalia
- Phylum: Arthropoda
- Class: Insecta
- Order: Plecoptera
- Family: Leuctridae
- Genus: Leuctra; Stephens, 1835

Diversity
- at least 210 species

= Leuctra (insect) =

Genus of stoneflies

Leuctra is a genus of rolled-winged stoneflies in the family Leuctridae. There are at least 210 described species in Leuctra.

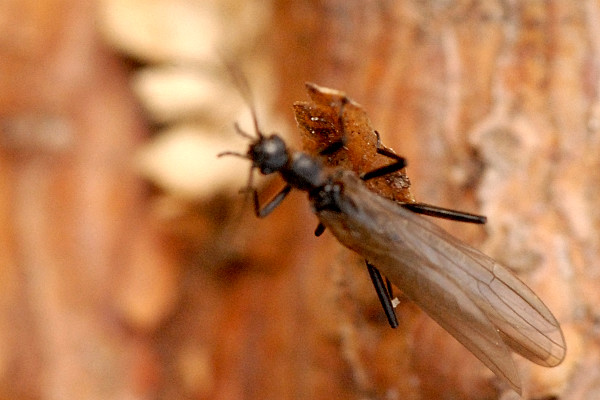
Leuctra nigra

== See also ==
- List of Leuctra species
