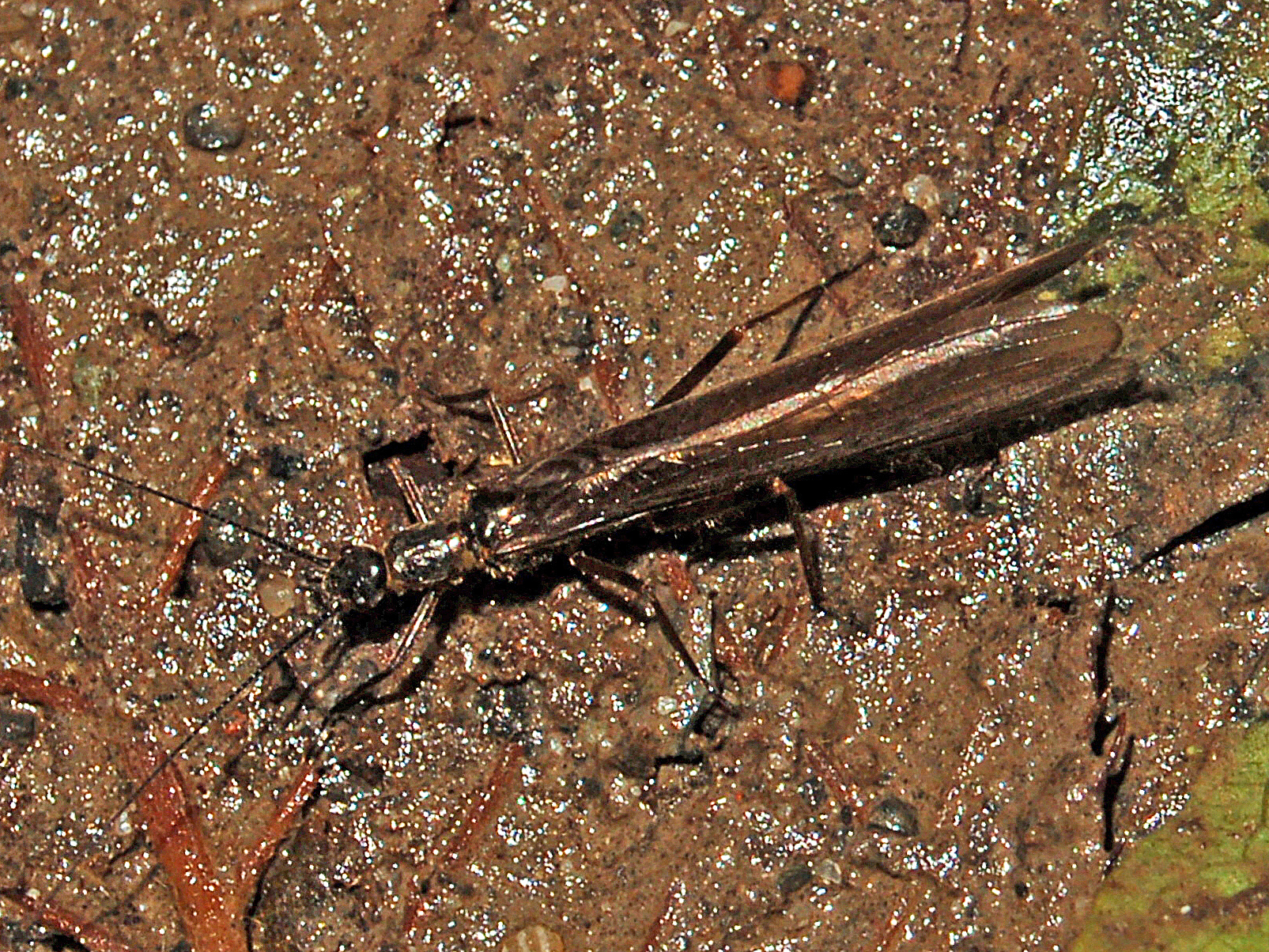
- Leuctridae sp.

Scientific classification
- Kingdom: Animalia
- Phylum: Arthropoda
- Class: Insecta
- Order: Plecoptera
- Superfamily: Nemouroidea
- Family: Leuctridae; Klapálek, 1905

= Leuctridae =

Leuctridae Temporal range: Tithonian–Recent

Family of stoneflies

The Leuctridae are a family of stoneflies. They are known commonly as rolled-winged stoneflies and needleflies. This family contains at least 390 species.

== Description ==
These small stoneflies can reach a length of 5–13 mm (0.20–0.51 in), but most of the species are less than 1 centimeter long. The wings are slender and cylindrical, usually dark brown in color. At rest, the wings appear to be wrapping their bodies. The adults develop in early spring, swarm, mate, and lay the eggs in the water. The slender, yellowish larvae are herbivorous, feeding on plants and organic waste.

== Distribution ==
The species of Leuctridae have a mainly Holarctic distribution.

== Systematics ==
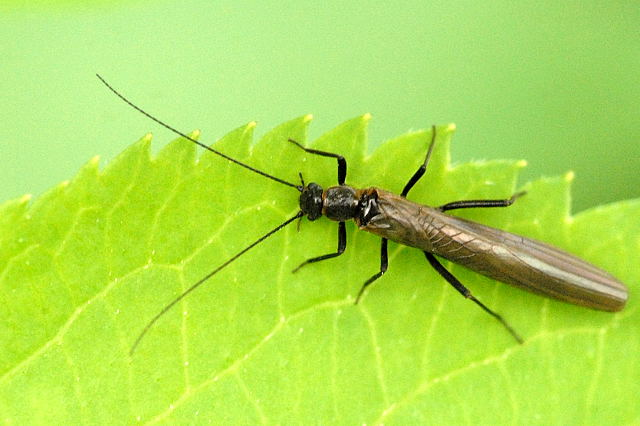
Leuctra inermis

Subfamilies, tribes, and genera include:

- Subfamily Leuctrinae Klapálek 1905
1. Calileuctra Shepard & Baumann, 1995
2. Despaxia Ricker, 1943
3. Leuctra (insect) Stephens, 1836
4. Moselia Ricker, 1943
5. Pachyleuctra Despax, 1929
6. Paraleuctra Hanson, 1941
7. Perlomyia Banks, 1906
8. Pomoleuctra Stark & Kyzar, 2001
9. Rhopalopsole Klapálek, 1912
10. Tyrrhenoleuctra Consiglio, 1957
11. Zealeuctra Ricker, 1952
- Subfamily Megaleuctrinae Zwick 1973 (monotypic)
1. Megaleuctra Neave, 1934
- Extinct genera
  - Genus †Baltileuctra Chen, 2018 Baltic amber, Eocene
  - Genus †Euroleuctra Chen, 2018 Baltic amber, Eocene
  - Genus †Lycoleuctra Sinitshenkova, 1987 Glushkovo Formation, Russia, Late Jurassic (Tithonian)
  - Genus †Rasnitsyrina Sinitshenkova, 2011 Ulaan-Ereg Formation, Mongolia, Late Jurassic (Tithonian) Khasurty locality, Russia, Early Cretaceous (Aptian)
  - Genus †Palaeopsole Caruso and Wichard 2011 Baltic amber, Eocene
