= Crmnica =

Region of Montenegro

Coordinates: 42°15′N 19°06′E

Crmnica numbered 16–22 in this map of Old Montenegro

Crmnica (Montenegrin Cyrillic: Црмница, pronounced [tsr̩mnitsa]) is one of the local communities (mjesne zajednice) of the municipality of Bar and a historical region in southern Montenegro. It was one of the four sub-regions of Old Montenegro, where it was known as Crmnička nahija ("the nahiya of Crmnica").

== Geography and demographics ==
Crmnica is located in south-western Montenegro, between the historical area of the Paštrovići tribe and Šestani/Krajina to the south. Crmnica is the most fertile region of Montenegro and it is well known for a local variety of viticulture, the Vranac. In the 19th century, the region consisted of the following villages: Boljevići, Braćeni, Brijege, Bukovik, Donji Brčeli, Dupilo, Gluhi Do, Godinje, Gornji Brčeli, Komarno, Krnjice, Limljani, Mačuge, Mikovići, Orahovo, Ovtočići, Podgor, Popratnica, Seoca, Sotonići, Tomići, Trnovo, Utrg, Virpazar and Zabes. Many of them today are depopulated or completely uninhabited because of the mass emigration wave that began in the 1990s. Virpazar, the central settlement of the region, has 277 inhabitants as of 2011.

The population adheres to Orthodoxy; roughly, the majority of the population declares as Montenegrins, the rest as Serbs.

== Origins ==
Crmnica first appears in the 13th century under two different names, Crmnica and Kučevo, which is the slavicized variant of an Albanian toponym that meant "red place" (kuq). Both names refer to the fact that the region was known for its quarry of red stone.

== History ==
In the Middle Ages, the area shows a strong symbiosis of Slavic and Albanian populations. The southern part of the area became part of the same administrative unit with Šestani when the Ottomans took over after 1479. In that period, the Slavic anthroponymy of Crmnica was frequently followed by the Albanian suffix -za. This phenomenon doesn't appear in such widespread form in any other area of Montenegro except for Mrkojevići to the south of Crmnica. It has been interpreted as the result of gradual, centuries-long adoption of Slavic culture by an Albanian-speaking population.

The Ottoman census of 1582–83 registered the Vilayet of the Black Mountain (vilayet-i Kara Dağ), part of the Sanjak of Scutari, as having the following nahiyah, with number of villages: Grbavci with 13 villages, Župa with 11, Malonšići with 7, Pješivci with 14, Cetinje with 16, Rijeka with 31, Crmnica with 11, Paštrovići with 36 and Grbalj with 9 villages; a total of 148 villages. One of the first detailed accounts of the villages of Crmnica was that of Venetian diplomat Mariano Bolizza who traveled in the area in 1614.
