= Sutomore =

Sutomore Сутоморе Spizza
- Town
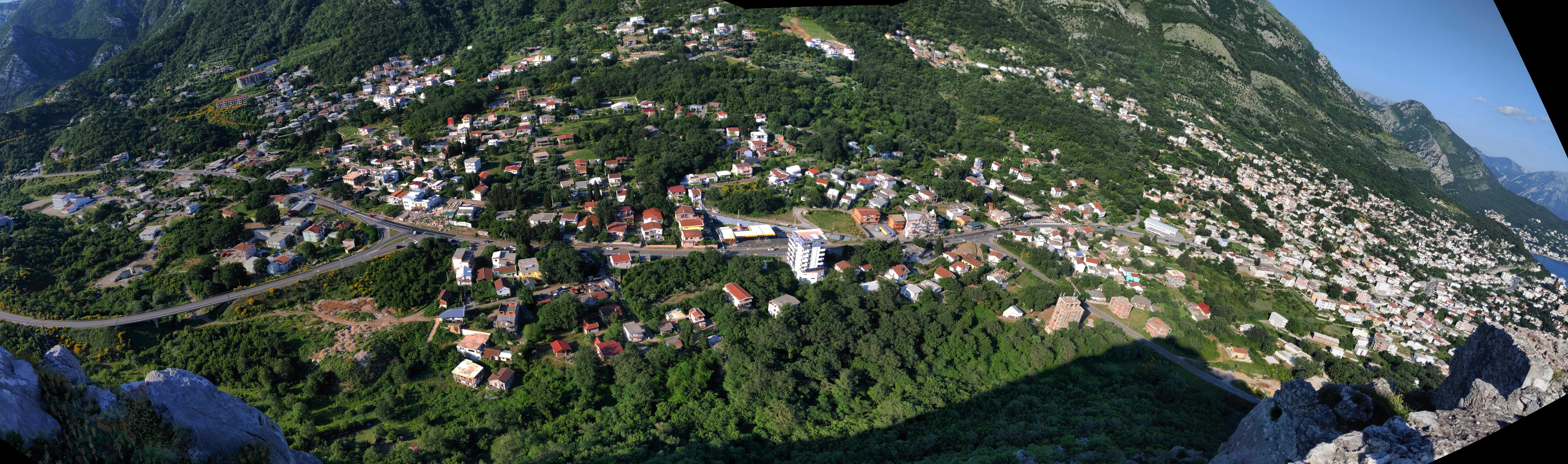
- A view of Sutomore from Haj-Nehaj fortress

- Location within Montenegro
- Coordinates: 42°08′34″N 19°02′48″E
- Country: Montenegro
- Region: Coastal
- Municipality: Bar

Population (2011)
  - Total: 2,004
- Time zone: UTC+1 (CET)
  - Summer (DST): UTC+2 (CEST)
- Postal code: 85355
- Area code: 030
- Vehicle registration: BR

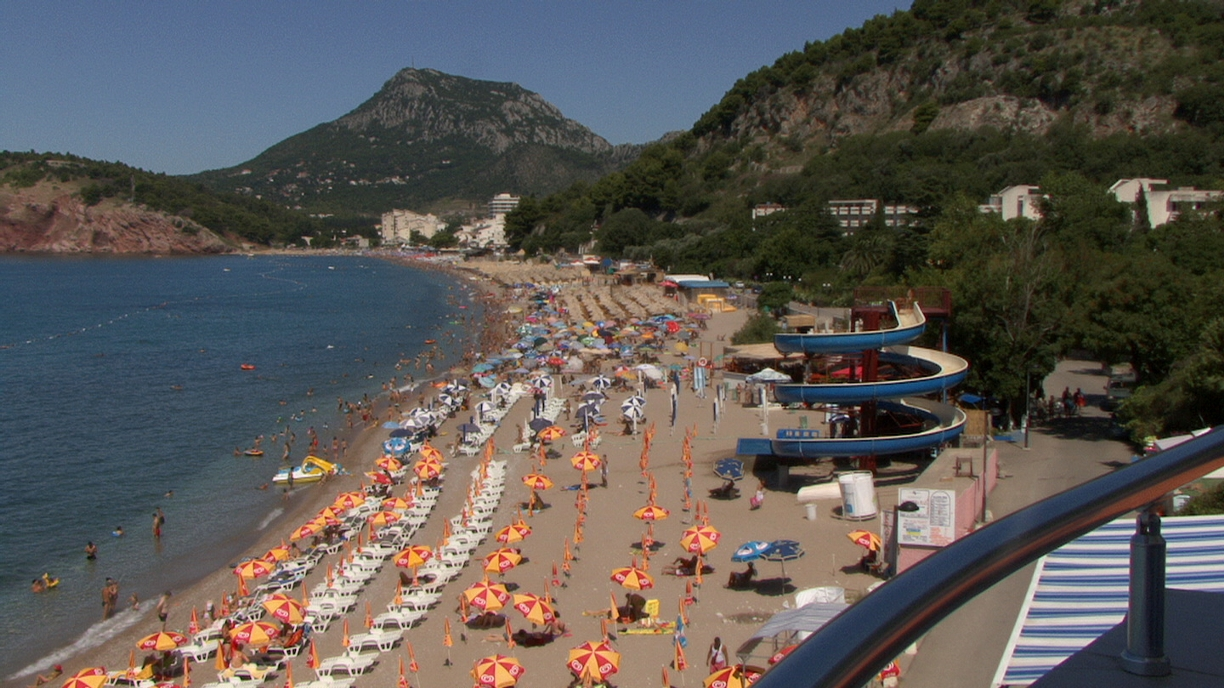
Beach in Sutomore

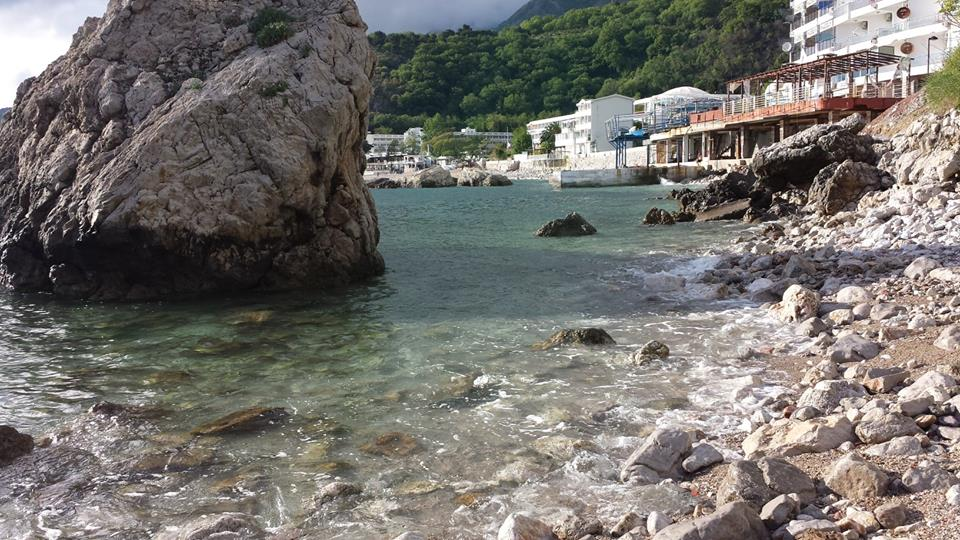
Town seen from one of the beaches

Sutomore (Montenegrin: Сутоморе, pronounced [sûtɔmɔːrɛ], Italian: Santa Maria degli Ospizi, Venetian: Spizza) is a town in Coastal region of Montenegro in Bar Municipality. A 2011 census put the population at 2,004.

== History ==
When it was under the control of the Republic of Venice from 1420 to 1797, Sutomore was called Spizza (in Venetian). It belonged administratively to Albania Veneta, except for short-lived periods of Ottoman occupation. When, in the late 16th century, the jurisdiction of the Benedictine monastery Ratac collapsed, the Orthodox rite began to strengthen in the formerly Catholic parishes of Spič (Sutomore), Sozina and Kastel Lastva, which had previously been under Catholic jurisdiction. At the same time, the Orthodox clergy and believers began to use Catholic churches of that area for their rites.

In the 19th century it became the part of the Habsburg Empire and later the Austro-Hungarian Empire. At that time, the name of the city was Spitza, and it was the southernmost settlement of the Empire. The Austrian census of 1910 reports the presence of Venetian speaking families in Spizza in the twentieth century.

== Overview ==
Today, Sutomore is a tourism-oriented community. It is a popular destination and a weekend resort, catering to tourists from Montenegro and the surrounding region. It is popular for its 2 km (1 mi) long sandy beach and vibrant nightlife. In 2023-2025 the city got new renovated embankment and square

Sutomore is located on the Adriatic Highway (E65/E80), and is connected to Podgorica and inland Montenegro via Sozina tunnel. It is also a stop on the Belgrade–Bar railway. The ease of access, coupled with its beach, has made Sutomore a very popular budget destination. However, the sheer number of tourists, combined with an informal and spontaneous building boom and lack of urban planning, have contributed to chronic traffic problems. As transit traffic from inland Montenegro to Bar goes straight through the town, traffic jams and crowded streets are commonplace during the summer months.

Sutomore is especially popular with youthful visitors from Serbia and the rest of Montenegro, as its beachside promenade is lined with numerous bars, cafes, fast food restaurants and nightclubs. It is generally recognised as being more affordable than the nearby resort of Budva.

== Population ==
According to the 2011 census, Sutomore has 2,004 inhabitants. If the nearby suburbs of Brca (263), Miljevci (340), Papani (175), Zagrađe (364), Zgrade (512) and Zankovići (305) were included by the Montenegrin Statistical Bureau, the population of Sutomore urban area would be close to 4,000 inhabitants. The ethnic composition of Sutomore is as follows:

- Montenegrins – 932
- Serbs – 821
- Others – 251
