= Bar Municipality =

Municipality of Montenegro

Bar Municipality: Opština Bar; Општина Бар; Komuna e Tivarit
- Municipality
- Flag Coat of arms

- Bar Municipality in Montenegro
- Country: Montenegro
- Seat: Bar
- Settlements: 77

Area
  - Municipality: 598 km^{2} (231 sq mi)

Population (2023 census)
  - Municipality: 46,171
  - Density: 77.2/km^{2} (200/sq mi)
  - Urban: 17,649
  - Rural: 24,399
- Postal code: 85000
- Area code: +382 30
- ISO 3166 code: ME-02
- Vehicle registration: BR
- Climate: Csa
- Website: bar.me

Bar Municipality (Montenegrin: Opština Bar, Општина Бар) is one of the municipalities of Montenegro. The center is the town of Bar. The municipality is located at the Adriatic coast in southeastern Montenegro. According to the 2011 census, the town proper had 17,649 inhabitants, while the total population of the Bar Municipality was 42,068. The preliminary 2023 census data counted the municipality population at 46,171 inhabitants.

== Geography and tourism ==
The Bar Municipality is located on the coastal western border of Montenegro on the shore of the Adriatic Sea. It is approximately 53 kilometres (33 mi) from Podgorica, the capital of Montenegro. To the east is the largest lake in the Balkans, Lake Skadar. To the west, across the sea, is Italy.

The natural area around Bar is mostly untouched and rich in vegetation. The municipality stretches to the southern shore of Skadar Lake and encompasses the Krajina region. This area is visited for its leisure activities and hiking. Smaller settlements near Bar, such as Dobra Voda, Sutomore and Čanj, are destinations for sunbathing, as they incorporate long sandy beaches.

=== Beaches ===
The municipality has over 44 kilometres (27 miles) of coastline. There are twenty beaches stretching over 9 kilometres (6 miles). In the north is Čanj, which has a 1,100-metre (3,600-foot) sandy beach. A boat takes tourists from Čanj to the Kraljičina Plaža (the Queen's beach). It lies below a natural wall of sedimentary rocks. Further south is the 300-metre-long (980-foot) Maljevik Beach. The beach at Sutomore, 1,200 metres (3,900 feet) long, has entertainment, activities and restaurants. Near the medieval monastery complex of Ratac is the Crvena Plaža (the Red beach), named after the colour of its fine sand. The beach is surrounded by a pine forest and located about a hundred metres from the main road to Bar. The Bar city beach is located in front of King Nikola I's palace. It is 750 metres (2,460 feet) long, partly gravel and partly sand.

There are also beaches on the shores of Lake Skadar.

=== Flora and fauna ===
The coastal part of Bar supports maquis shrubland with oak, holm oak, laurel, myrtle, Spanish broom, oleander, hawthorn, sloe, butcher's broom, and asparagus. To the north and the mountains, there are oak and beech forests. Citrus fruits including tangerines, oranges, and lemons grow in the Bar area as do pomegranates, olives, grapevines, and figs. Ginkgo biloba grows in the park of King Nikola's palace. Lake Skadar is rich in birdlife, including the pelican. Game animals are found in Ostros, Rumija, Lisinj, Sutorman, and Sozina and include rabbit, badgers, foxes, wolves, and wild boar. One can find various kinds of seashells, snails, echinoderms, cephalopods and crayfish on the shores of Bar.

== Demographics ==
=== Divisions and settlements ===
The municipality consists of 77 settlements, four of which, Bar, Stari Bar, Sutomore and Virpazar are urban, while the rest are rural or suburban. The municipality is divided into 12 local communities (mjesna zajednica): Topolica (part of Bar), Polje, Bjeliši, Burtaiši, Sutorman, Stari Bar, Šušanj, Sutomore, Mrkojevići, Krajina, Šestani and Crmnica. A census in 2011 recorded 42,048 people in the Bar Municipality.

Commune	Settlements
Bar I	central business district
Bar II	Polje, Burtaiši, Čeluga, part of Rena;
Bar III	Bjeliši, Sokolana, Stara Ambulanta, Zgrade Prvoborca;
Bar IV	Popovići, part of Bjeliši, Ahmetov Brijeg, Vuletića Brijeg, part of Rena and Trsanj
Bar V	Sustaš, Zupci, Marovići, Tuđemili
Šušanj	Žukotrlica, Novi Pristan, Zeleni Pojas, Ilino, Šušanj, Carevići, Vitići and Paladini
Sutomore	Brca, Zelen, Obala Željezničke Kolonije, Mirošica I, Turke, Pobrđe, Gorelac, Miljevci, Sozina, Zankovići, Suvi Potok, Mirošica II, Zgrade, Bjelila, Papani, Haj-Nehaj, Zagrađe, Mišići, Đurmani and Čanj
Stari Bar (Old Bar)	Stari Bar, Baukovo, Belveder, Velembusi, Gretva, Brbot, Turčini, Menke, Mikulići, Podgrad, Bartula, Rap, Gornja Poda, Donja Poda, Tomba, Gornje Zaljevo and Donje Zaljevo
Mrko(je)vići	Pečurice, Dobra Voda, Grdovići, Pelinkovići, Dabezići, Velje Selo, Kunje, Velja Gorana and Mala Gorana
Kraja	Arbnesh, Ostros i Madh, Ostros i Naltë, Martiqi, Runji, Kështenjë, Boboshti, Skje, Ftjani
Šestani	Livari, Gornja Briska, Donja Briska, Gornji Murići, Donji Murići, Besa, Pinčići, Bapsulj, Šestani
Crmnica	Virpazar, Orahovo, Bračeni, Milovići, Zabes, Boljevići, Sotonići, Bukovik, Mačuge, Dupilo, Popratnica, Komarno, Trnovo, Gornji Brčeli, Donji Brčeli, Brijege, Ovtočići, Tomići, Utrg, Godinje, Seoca, Krnjice, Limljani, Gluhi Do

Historical population:

Historical population
Year	Pop.	±%
1948	21,487	—
1953	23,009	+7.1%
1961	24,587	+6.9%
1971	27,580	+12.2%
1981	32,535	+18.0%
1991	37,321	+14.7%
2003	40,037	+7.3%
2011	42,048	+5.0%
2023	45,812	+9.0%

=== Ethnicity ===
Bar (2023)
Montenegrins	42.26%
Serbs	26.12%
Bosniaks	8.52%
Russians	5.97%
Albanians	4.19%
Muslims	3.42%
Others	9.52%

Ethnic composition of the municipality in 2023:

Ethnicity	Number	Percentage
Montenegrins	19,361	42.26%
Serbs	11,968	26.12%
Bosniaks	3,901	8.52%
Russians	2,733	5.97%
Albanians	1,919	4.19%
ethnic Muslims	1,565	3.42%
Other/not declared	4365	9.52%
Total	45,812	100%

=== Religion ===
St. Jovan Vladimir Church

The main religion in Bar is Orthodox Christianity. However, there are churches from both the Eastern Orthodox and Catholic traditions, as well as mosques built by the Ottomans in the Islamic tradition. Bar is the birthplace of Saint Jovan Vladimir. In 1089, the Roman Catholic Archdiocese of Bar was founded and included most of Montenegro and Serbia.

Religion	Number	Percentage
Eastern Orthodox	25,208	55.02%
Islam	14,640	31.96%
Roman Catholic	2,801	6.11%
Atheist	1,147	2.50%
Other	697	1.53%
Undeclared	1,319	2.88%

=== City Assembly (2022–2026) ===
Name	Seats	Local government
DPS	11 / 37	Government
SD	4 / 37	Government
ZBCG (NSD–DNP)	4 / 37	Opposition
SDP	3 / 37	Government
DCG	3 / 37	Opposition
PES	3 / 37	Opposition
URA	3 / 37	Opposition
BB	2 / 37	Opposition
LP	1 / 37	Government
PzP	1 / 37	Opposition
UCG	1 / 37	Opposition
BS	1 / 37	Opposition

== Gallery ==
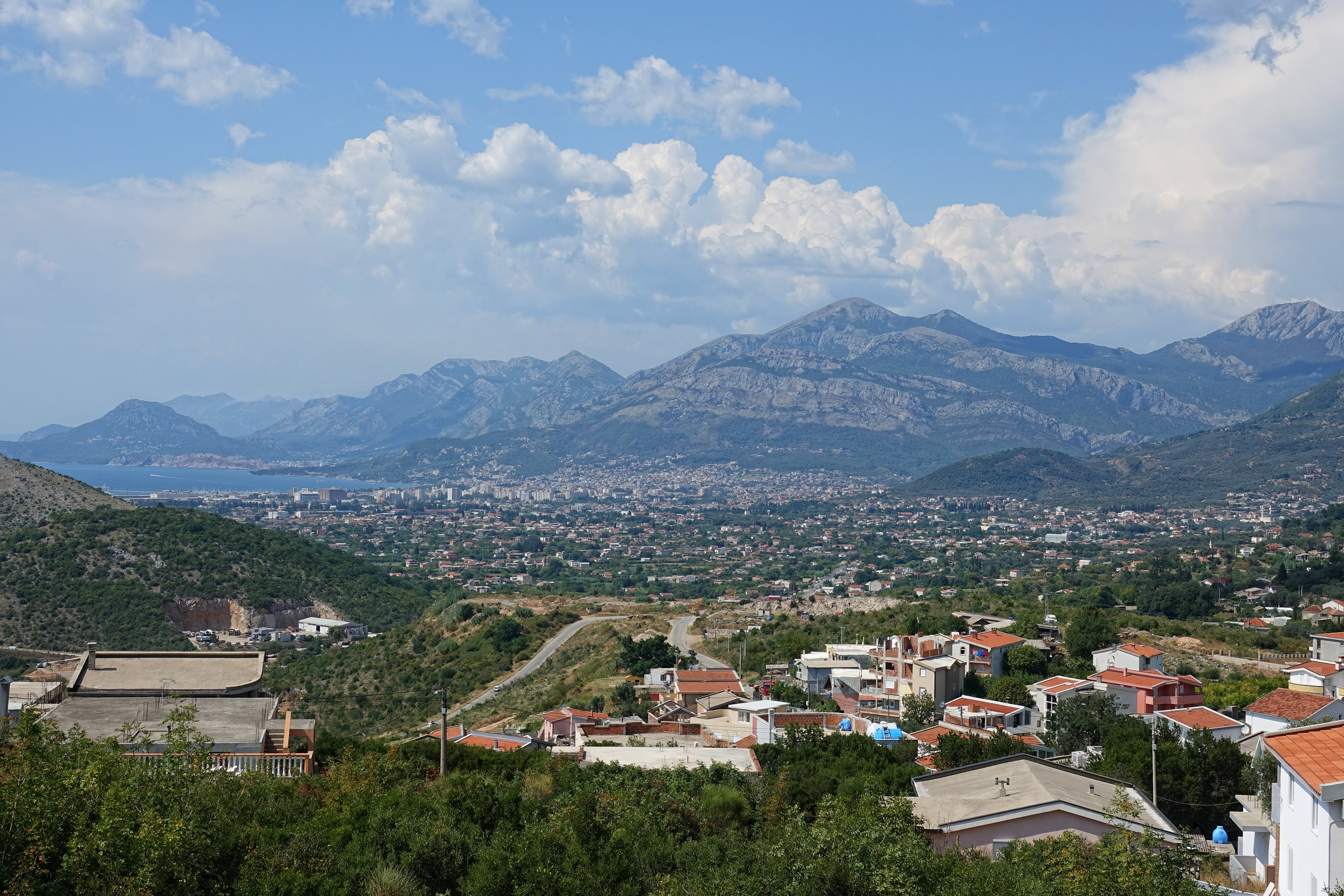
Town of Bar, Montenegro

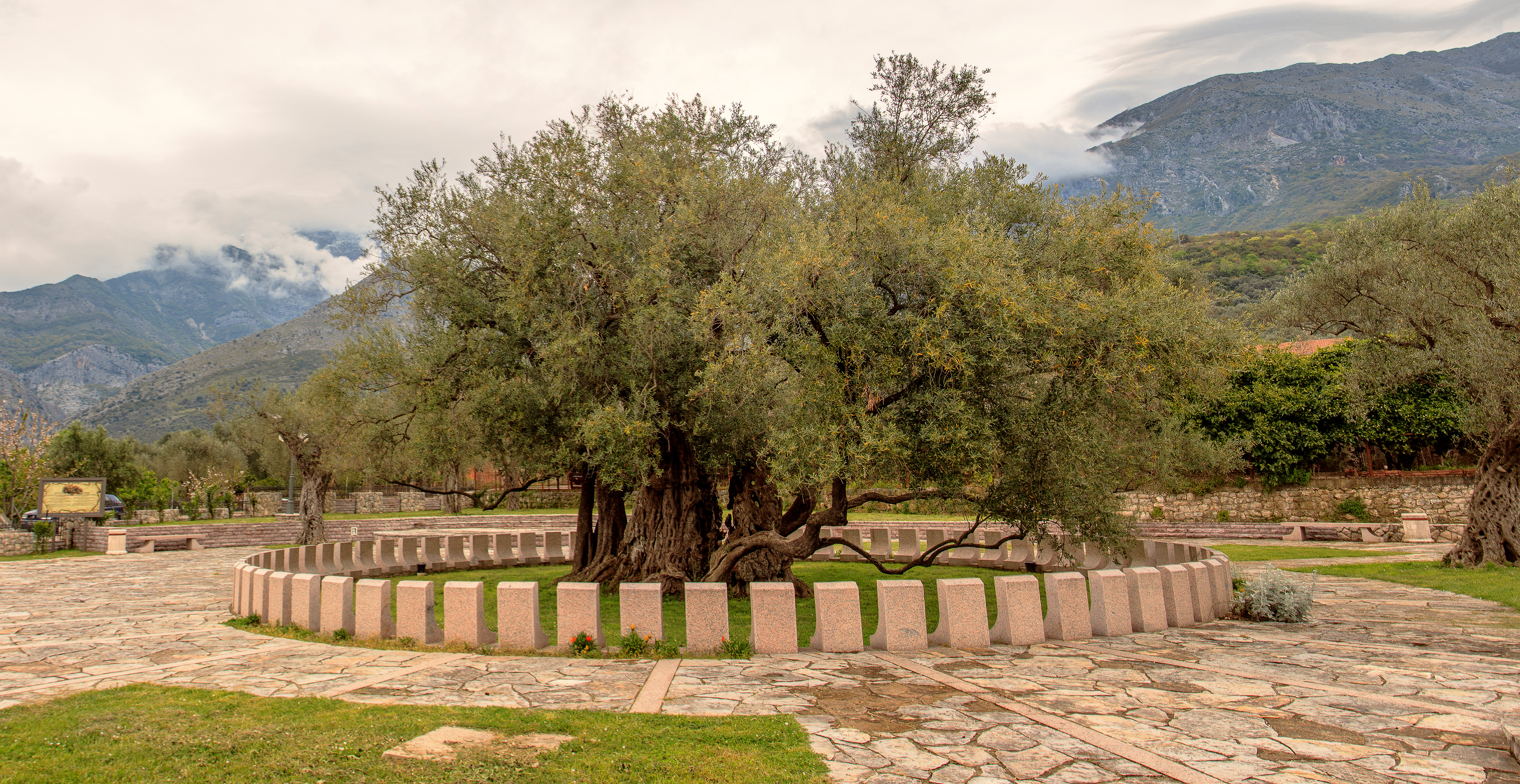
"Olea europea”, a 2000 year old tree.

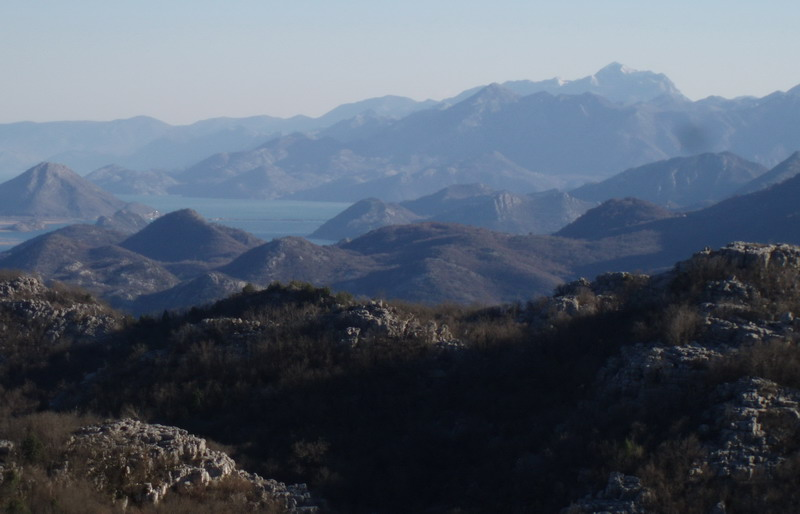
Rumija Mounthain and Skadar Lake

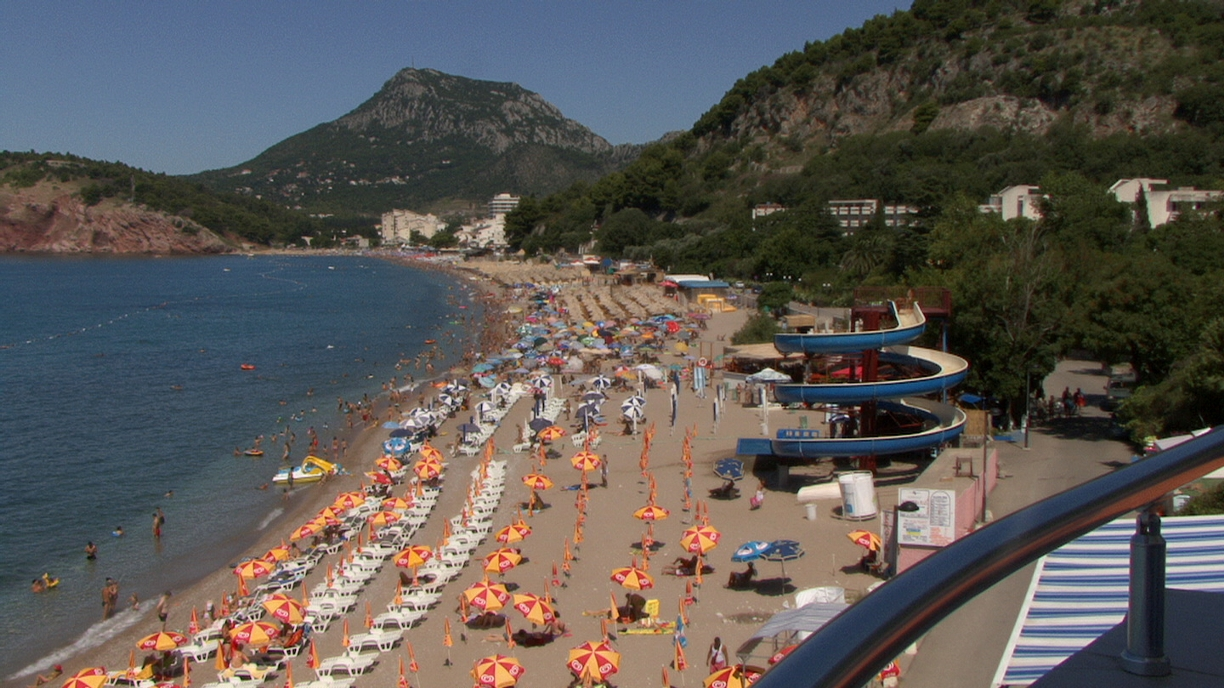
Sutomore

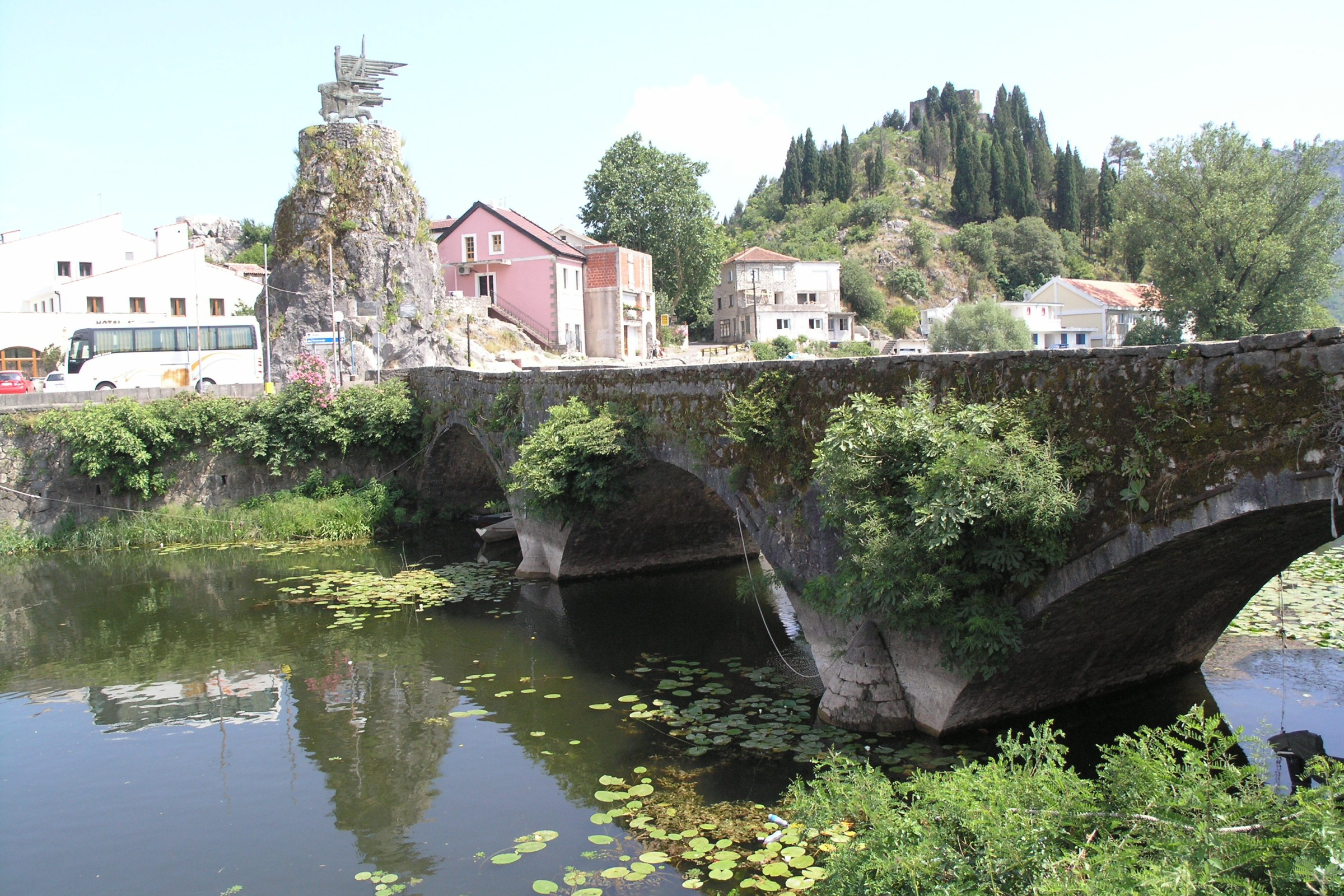
Virpazar near Lake Skadar

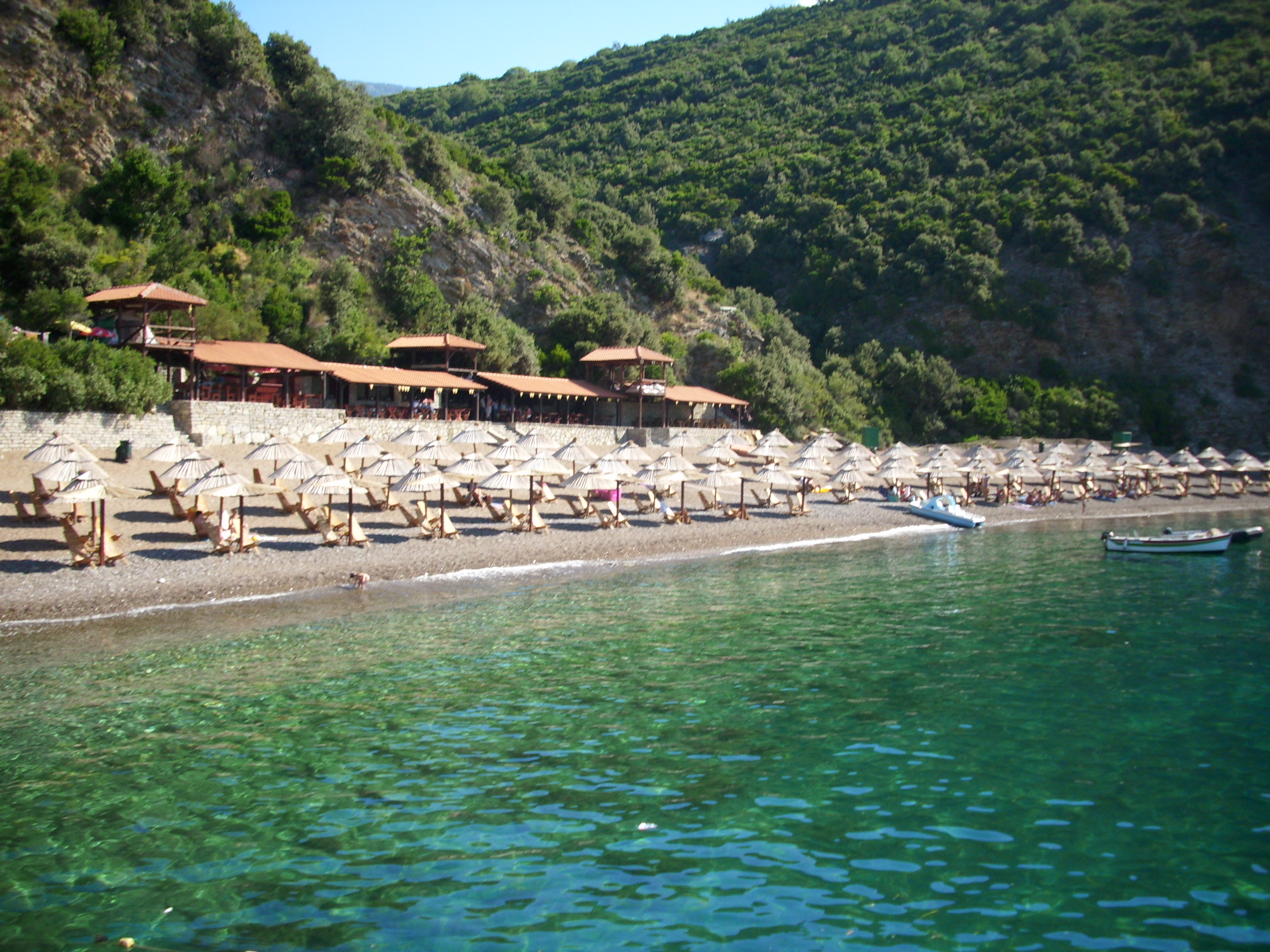
Queen's Beach near Čanj

Church of St. Jovan Vladimir, Bar in Bar

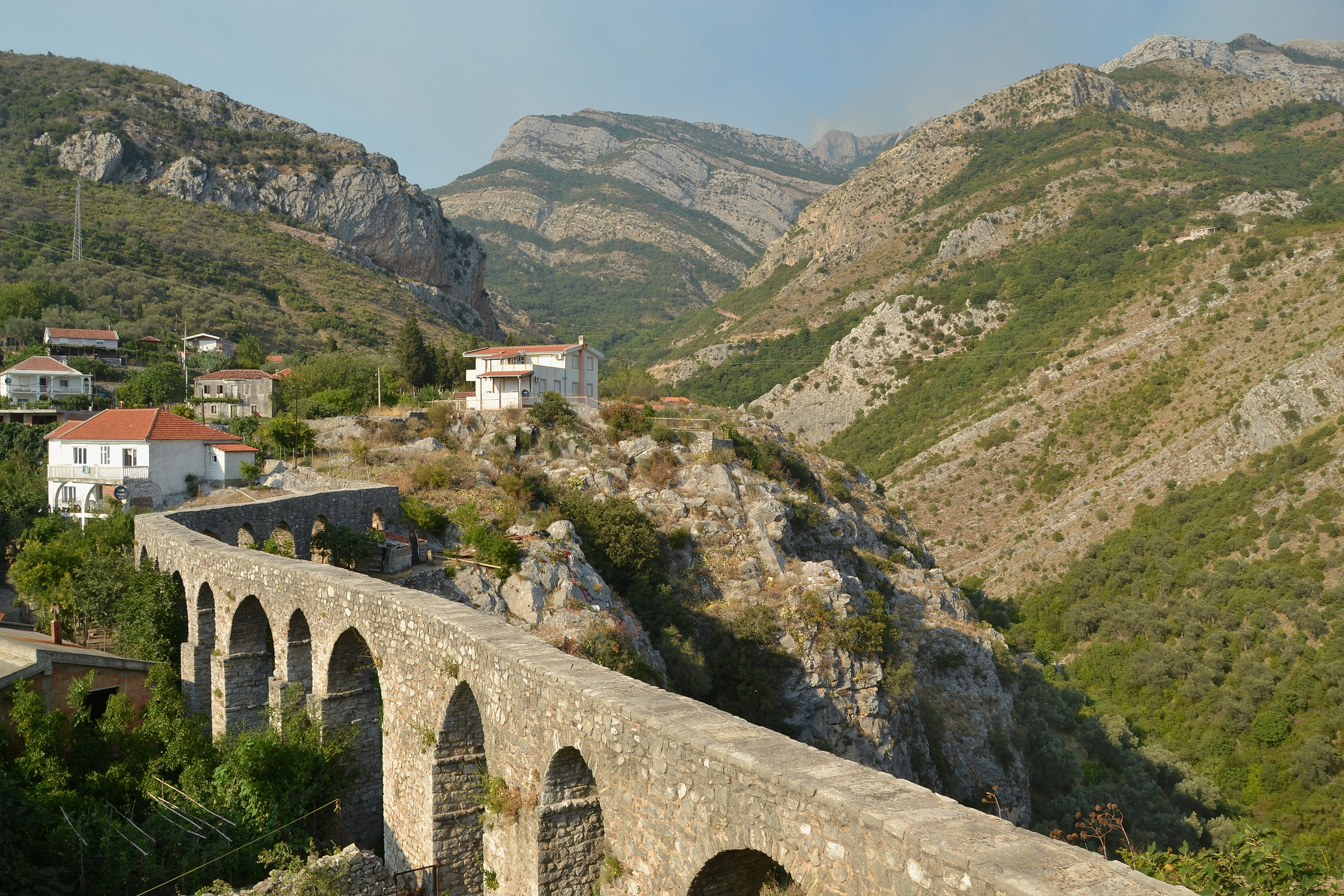
Bar Aqueduct
