= Šušanj =

Šušanj Шушањ
- Town
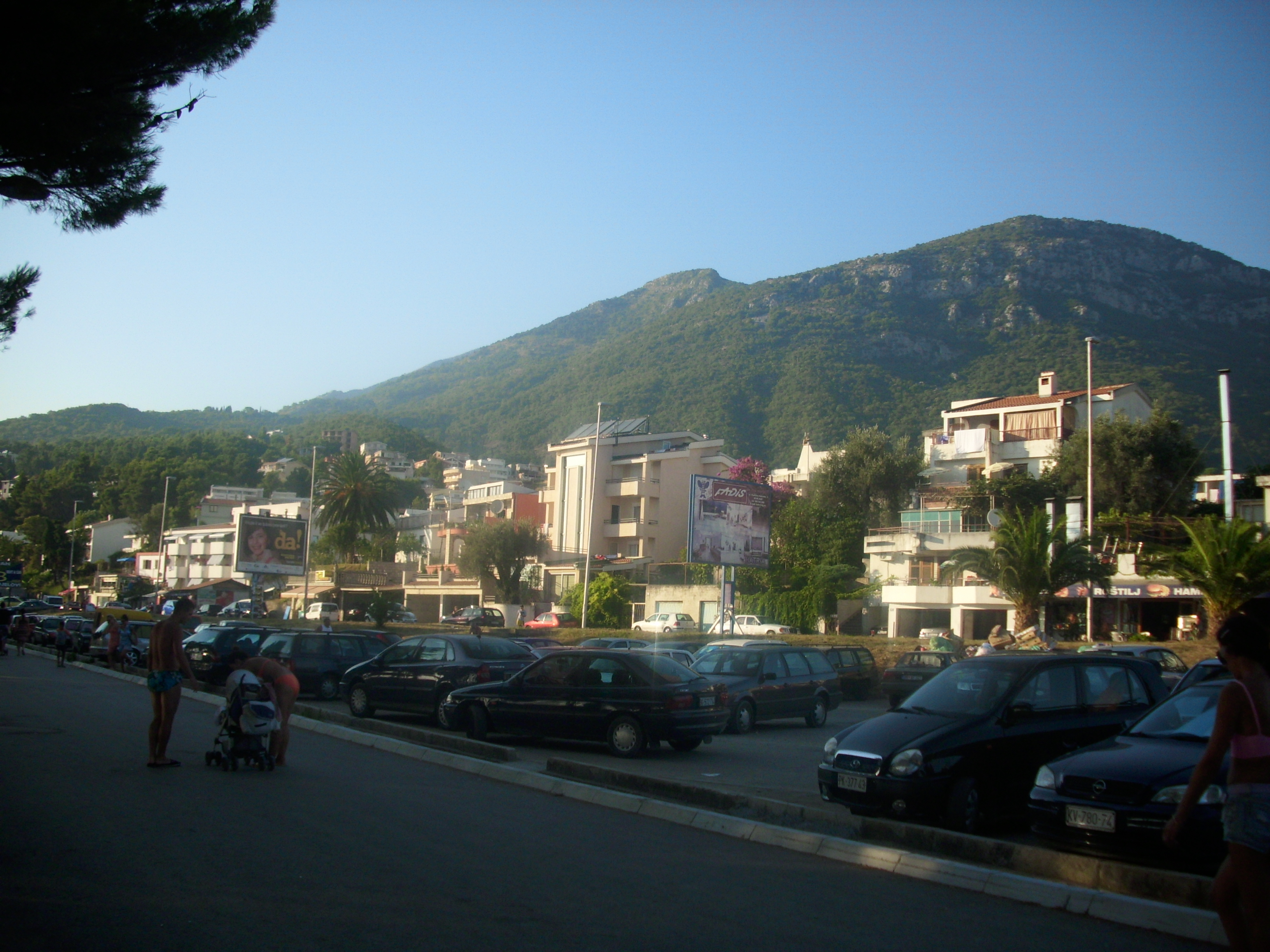
- View of Šušanj from beach promenade.

- Location within Montenegro
- Coordinates: 42°06′34″N 19°05′11″E
- Country: Montenegro
- Municipality: Bar
- Elevation: 151 ft (46 m)

Population (2011)
  - Total: 2,630
- Time zone: UTC+1 (CET)
  - Summer (DST): UTC+2 (CEST)
- Area code: +382 30
- Car plates: BR

Šušanj (Montenegrin: Шушањ, pronounced [ʃûːʃaɲ]) is a small town in the municipality of Bar, Montenegro. A 2011 census put the population at 2,630.

== Overview ==
The town is located on the coast of the Adriatic Sea between Sutomore and Bar. The settlement is actually a suburban area of Bar, adjoining it closely from the north side. Šušanj is protected from all sides by the forested slopes of Mount Rumia, so the Adriatic Sea coast in this place warms up much earlier - a lot of sun and little wind attract vacationers here from early spring to late autumn. On the territory of Šušanj, there is the famous Žukotrlica beach, named after the Spanish broom, a plant that the Montenegrins themselves call žukva. It's quite popular because of the nice shade and air quality provided by the pine trees. In summer the town has many tourists staying in local accommodation; bars, restaurants and shops are open throughout the warmer months. The Belgrade–Bar railway passes through the town on its approach to Bar. The town is 1 kilometer from the Bar and connected with a beach promenade.

== History ==
Just three decades ago, on the site of today's resort, there was a field where local farmers grew Greek and Italian olives. After the expansion of Bar, the inhabitants of Old Pristan settled here, and the rapidly growing town actually became the northern suburb of a large municipality.

== Demographics ==
According to the 2011 census, the town has a population of 2,630 people.

Population of Šušanj
Year	Pop.	±%
1948	307	—
1953	340	+10.7%
1961	580	+70.6%
1971	1,328	+129.0%
1981	2,520	+89.8%
1991	1,324	−47.5%
2003	2,212	+67.1%
2011	2,630	+18.9%

Ethnicity in 2011
Ethnicity	Number	Percentage
Montenegrins	1,216	46.23%
Serbs	851	32.35%
Bosniaks	163	6.19%
ethnic Muslims	94	3.57%
Albanians	14	0.53%
Russians	51	1.93%
Croats	20	0.76%
Macedonians	13	0.49%
Romani	20	0.76%
Yugoslavs	8	0.30%
Undeclared	132	5.01%
Unknown	8	0.36%
Others	26	0.98%
Total	2,630	100%
