= BRCA =

Brca or BRCA may refer to:

- Brca (Bar Municipality), a village in Montenegro
- BRCA mutation, mutations in two genes which produce a hereditary breast-ovarian cancer syndrome
  - BRCA1, the first of these genes to be discovered
  - BRCA2, the second of these genes to be discovered
- British Radio Car Association, a British radio controlled car racing organisation
- Brotherhood Railway Carmen of America, a defunct American trade union
- Bureau Central de Renseignements et d'Action, the Free French intelligence agency during World War II
