= Montenegrin Littoral =

Coastal region of Montenegro

Coordinates: 42°12′N 19°00′E

The Montenegrin Littoral (Montenegrin: Црногорско приморје / Crnogorsko primorje), historically known as the Littoral or the Maritime, is the littoral or coastline region of Montenegro which borders the Adriatic Sea. The littoral was lost to Austria and Turkey during its collapse due to Ottoman invasion - but it was regained in 1878 (Turkish-occupied portion) and 1918 (Austrian-occupied portion) following the Montenegrin victories in the Russo-Turkish War and World War I, respectively.

== Geography ==
Kotor is part of the World Heritage Site dubbed the Natural and Culturo-Historical Region of Kotor.

== History ==
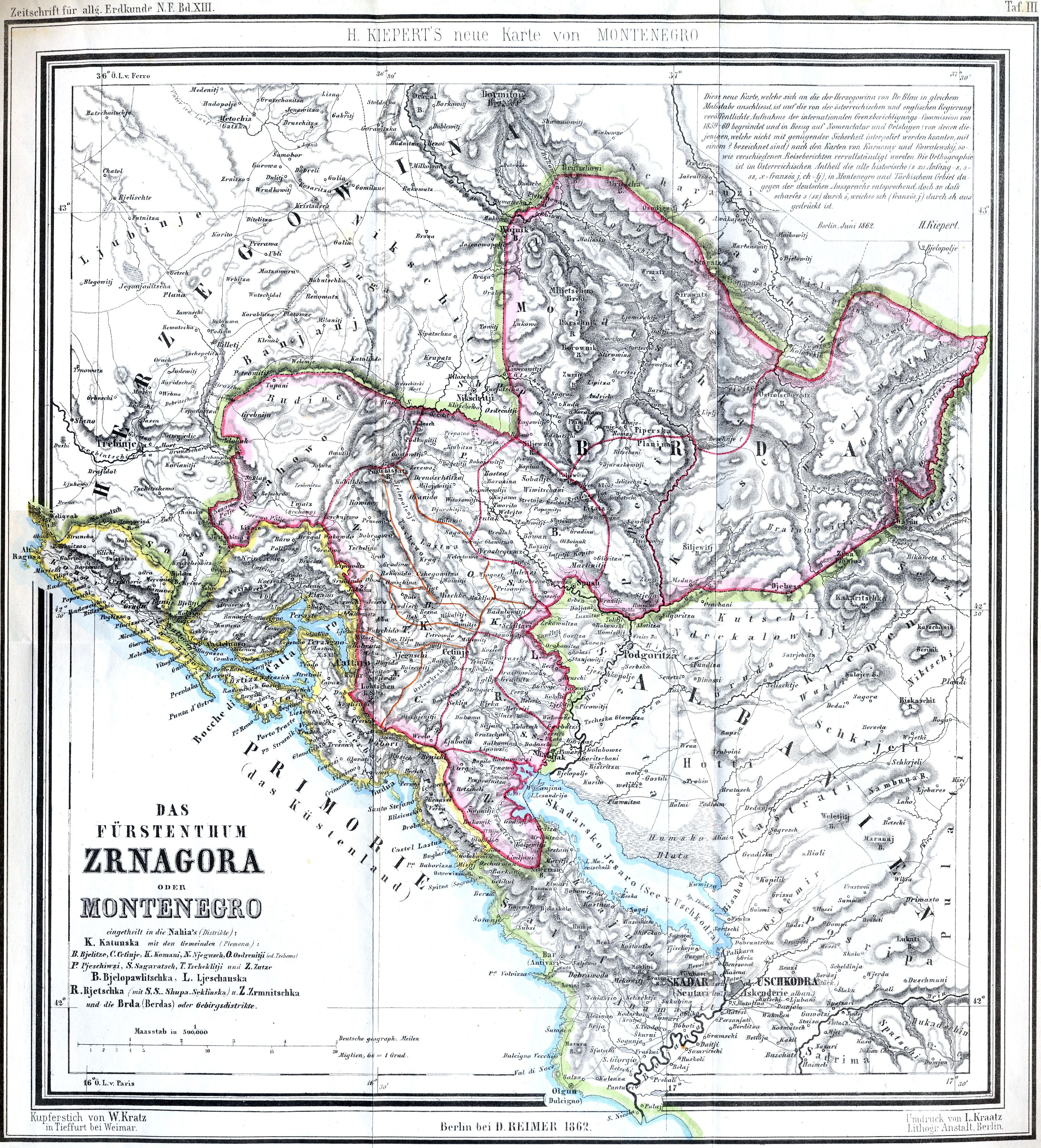
1862 map, Montenegrin Littoral (yellow); Principality of Montenegro (red).

=== Middle Ages ===
The region was part of Serbia in the Middle Ages. With the fall of the Serbian Empire, most of it was subsequently part of the Serbian Despotate. Zeta, in the hands of the Crnojevići lost its status of independent state, though vassal of Ottoman Empire, when it was added to territory of Sanjak of Scutari in 1499. In 1514 this territory was separated from the Sanjak of Scutari and established as separate Sanjak of Montenegro, under the rule of Skenderbeg Crnojević. When he died in 1528, the Sanjak of Montenegro was joined to the Sanjak of Scutari, as a unique administrative unit with certain degree of autonomy. The Republic of Venice had greatly expanded under the years (see Venetian Albania).

=== Modern history ===
The westernmost parts of the coastline were conquered by Napoleonic France in 1810. It was organized into the Cattaro subdélégation of the Illyrian Provinces (1811). In 1815, the same parts were taken by the Habsburg monarchy, and organized into Kingdom of Dalmatia.

== Municipalities ==
The region includes following municipalities:

- Herceg Novi Municipality
- Tivat Municipality
- Kotor Municipality
- Budva Municipality
- Bar Municipality
- Ulcinj Municipality

== Gallery ==
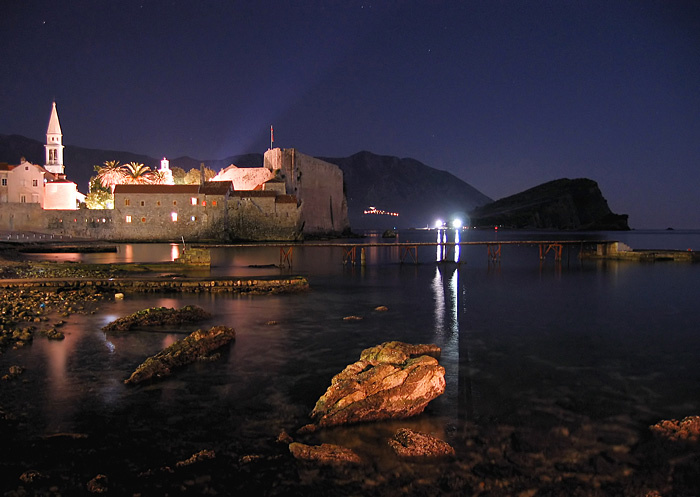
Budva

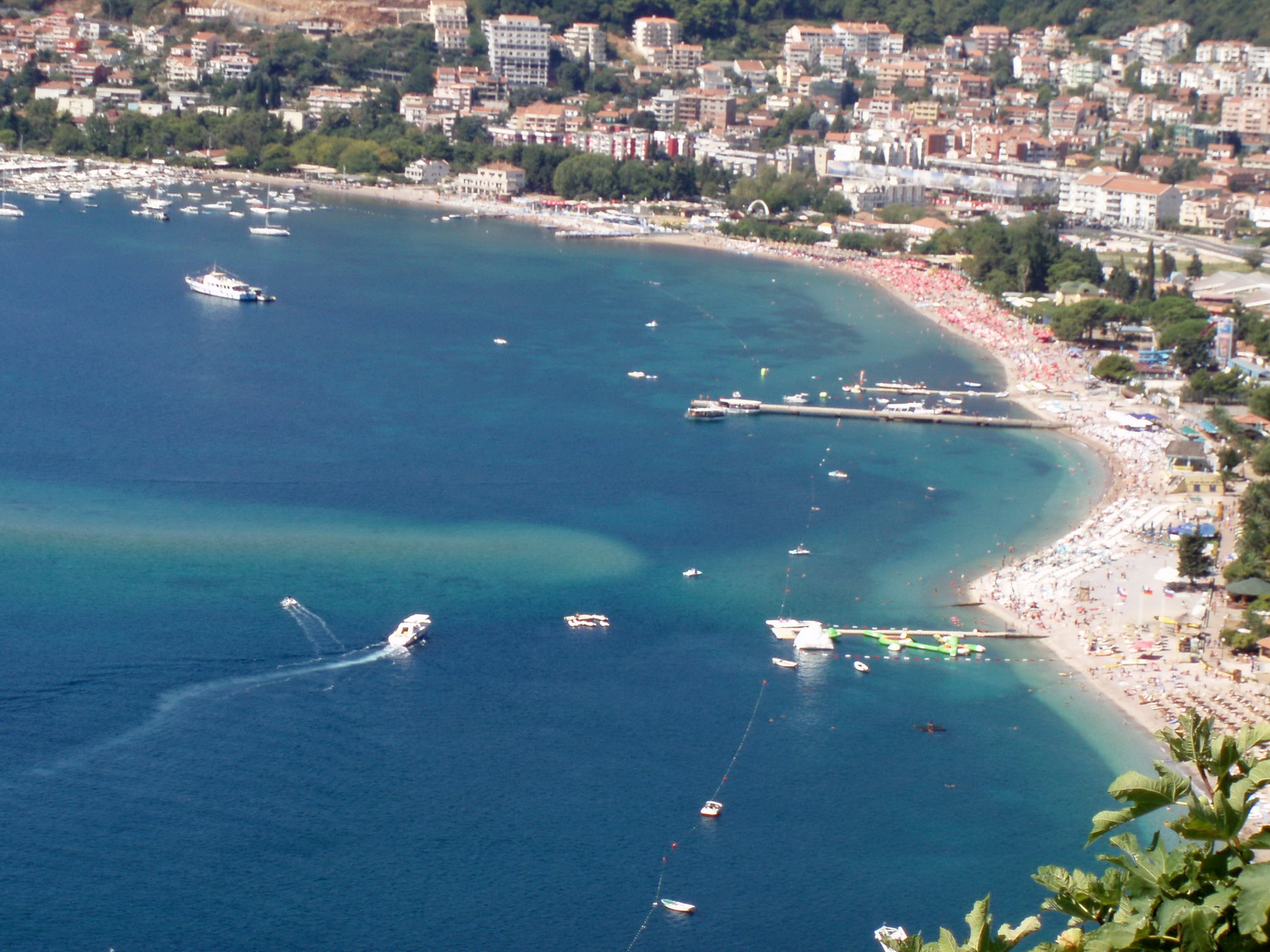
Slovenska beach in Budva

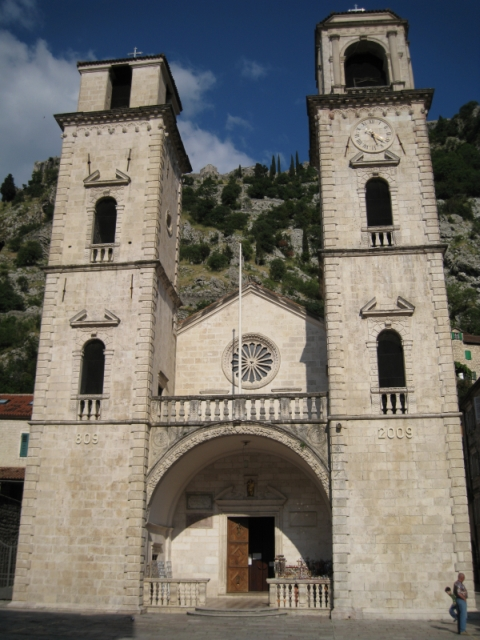
Cathedral of Saint Tryphon in Kotor

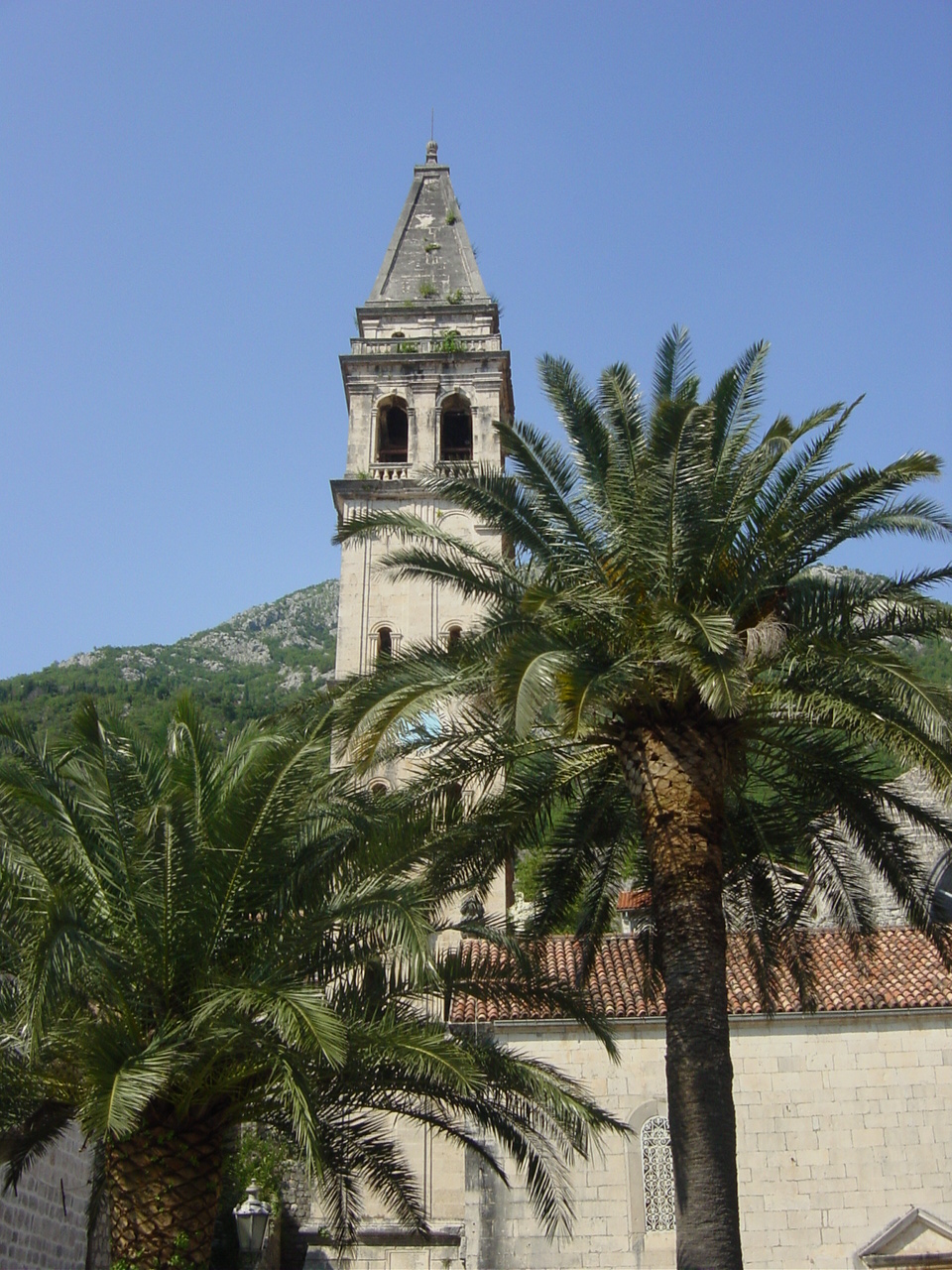
Church in Perast

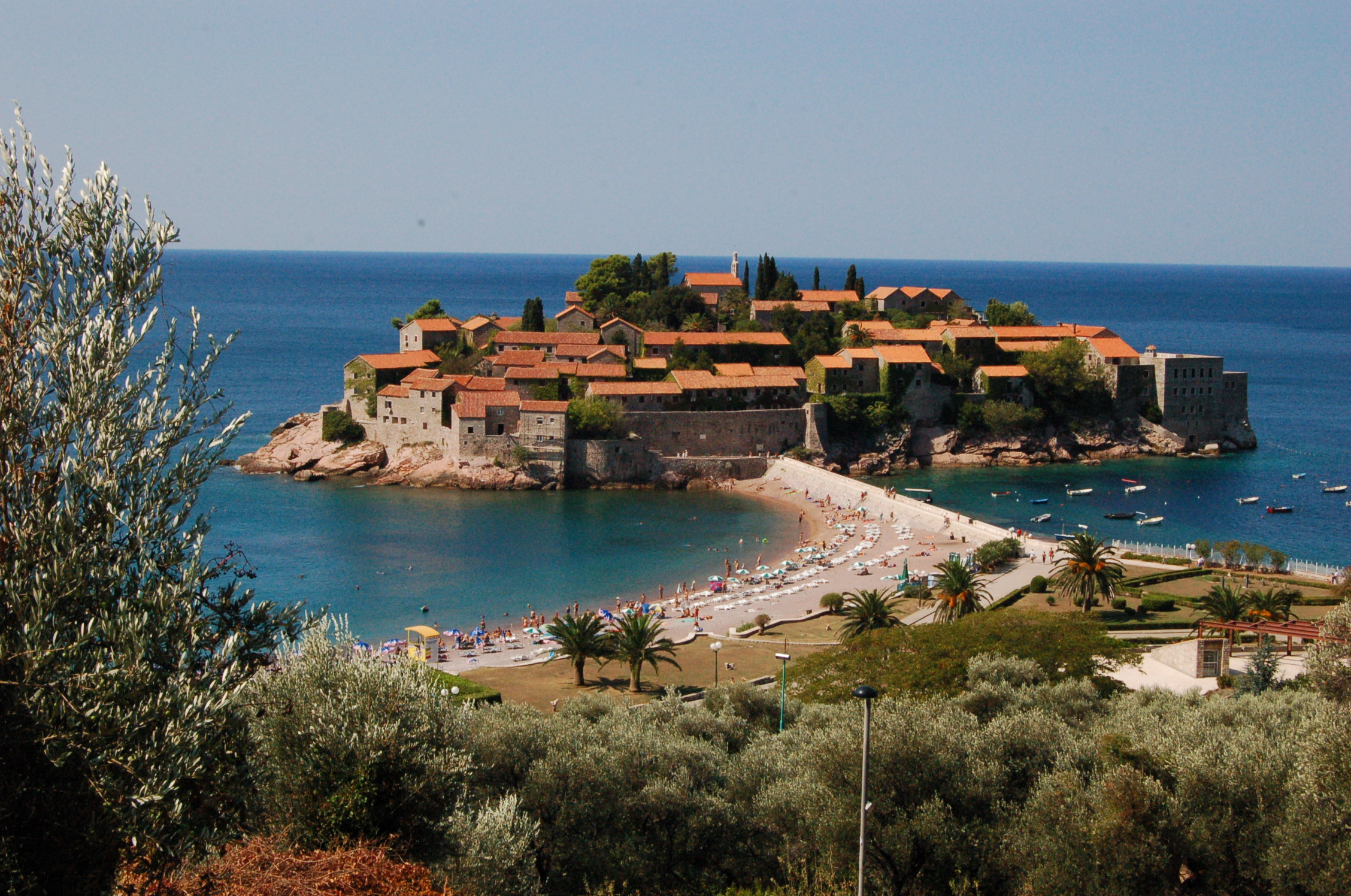
Sveti Stefan

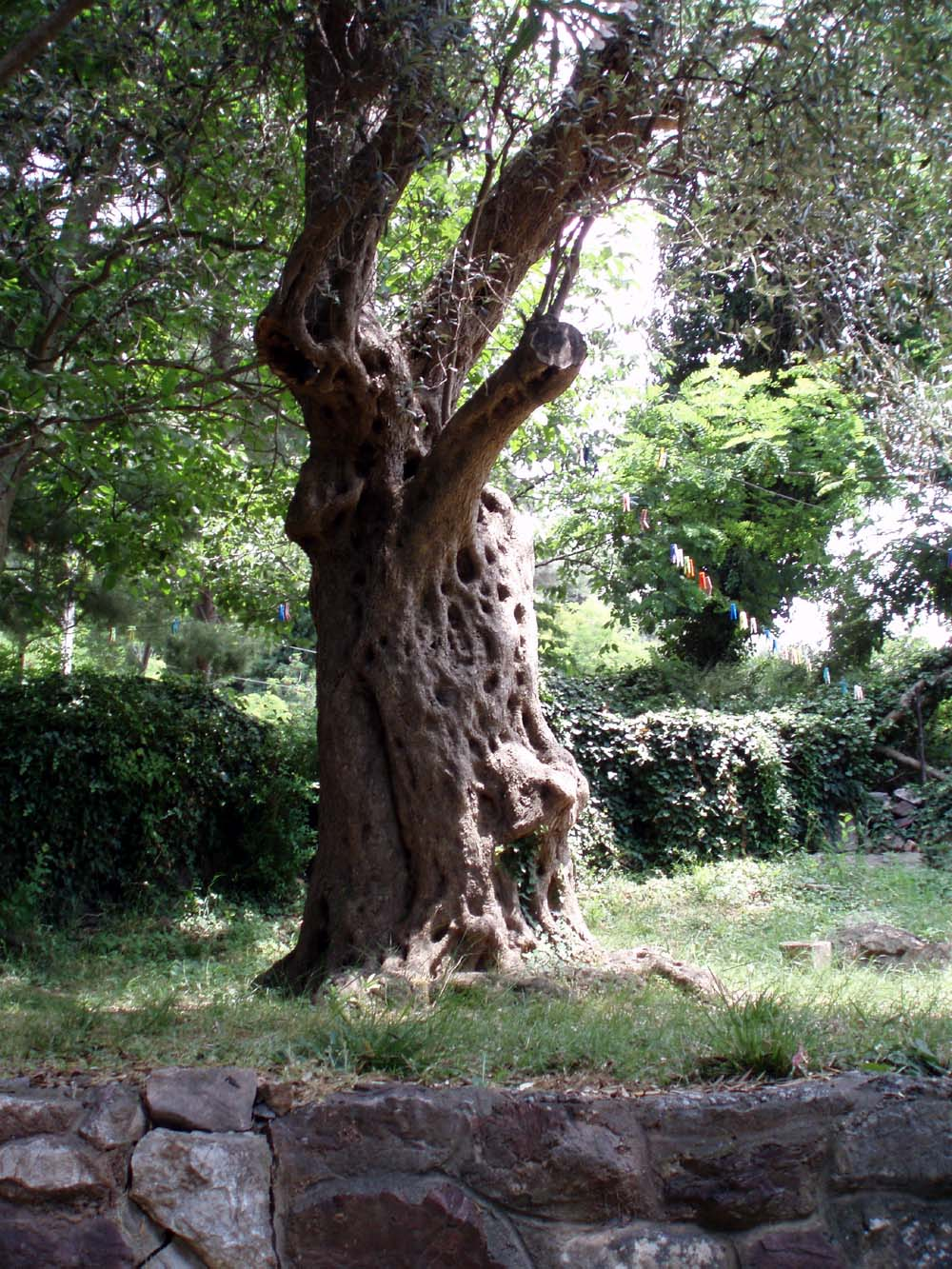
A 2000-year-old olive tree in Bar

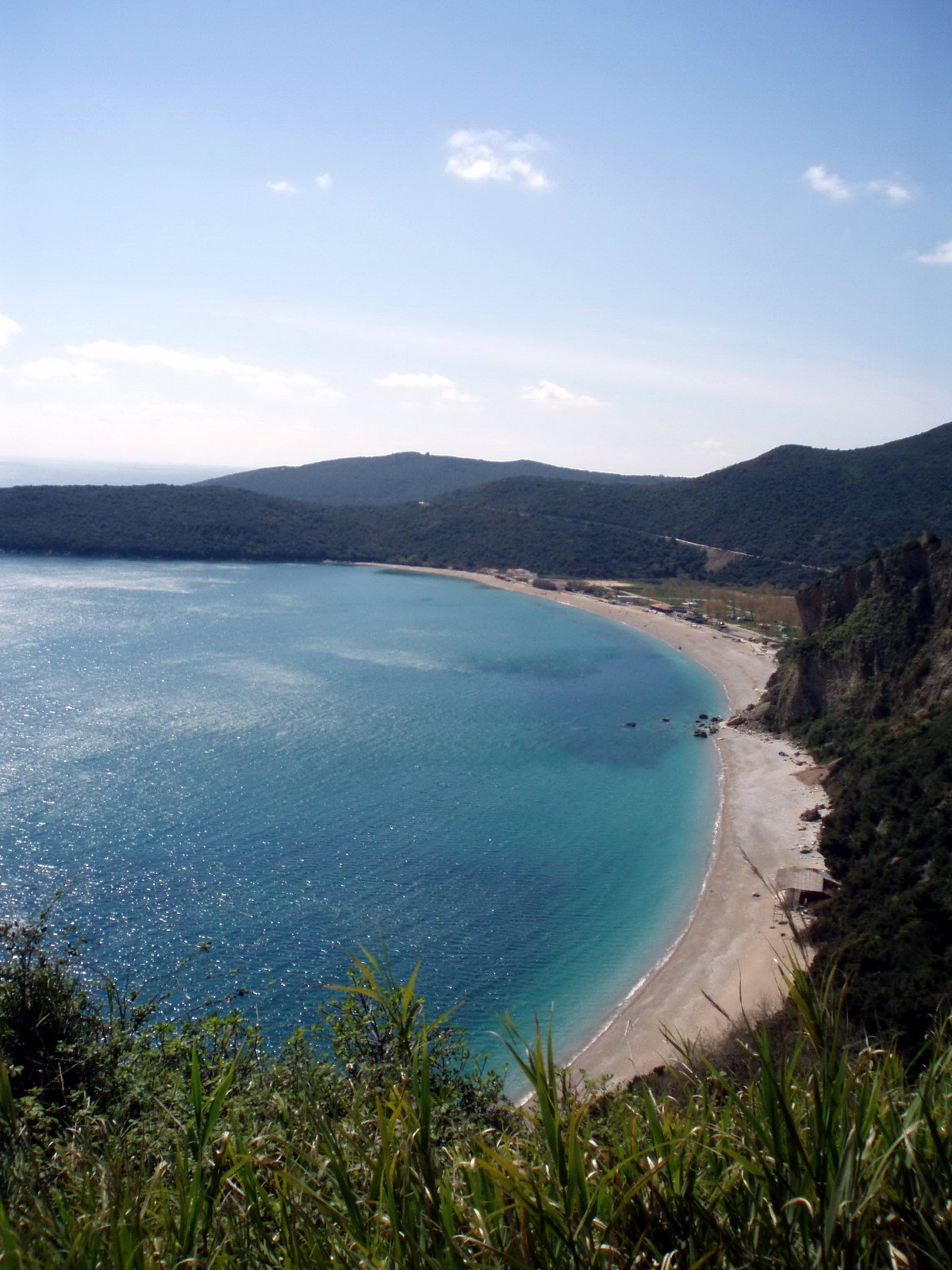
Jaz beach

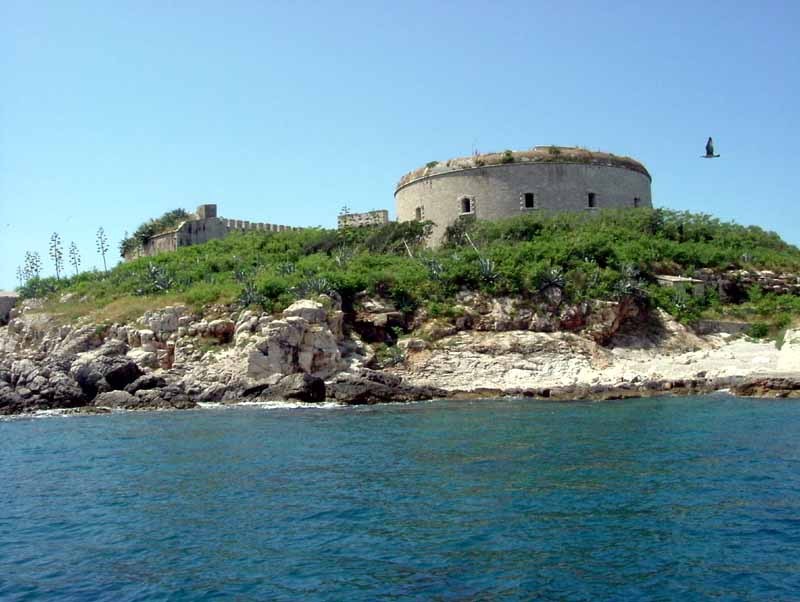
Mamula island

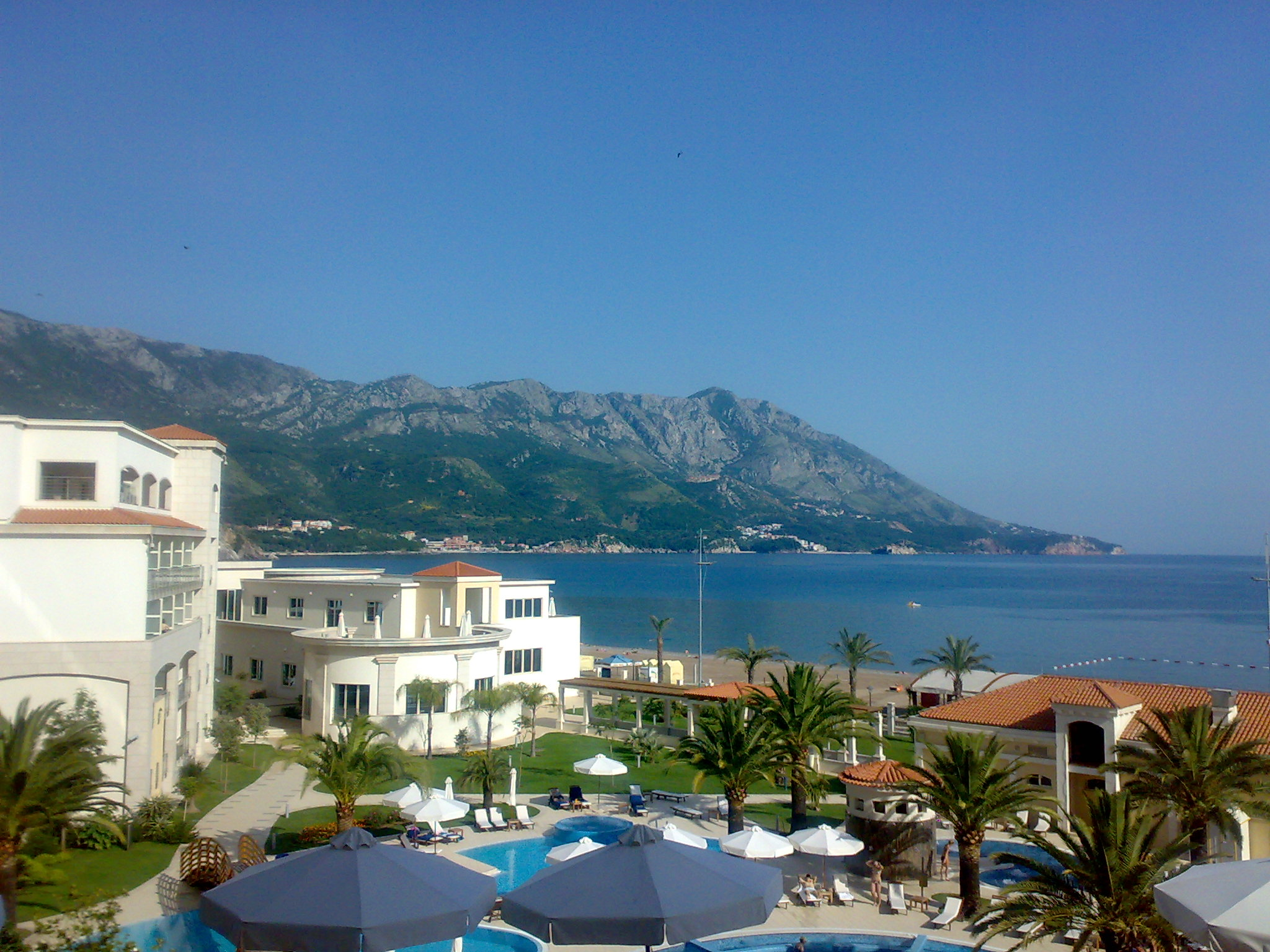
View from Hotel Splendid in Bečići

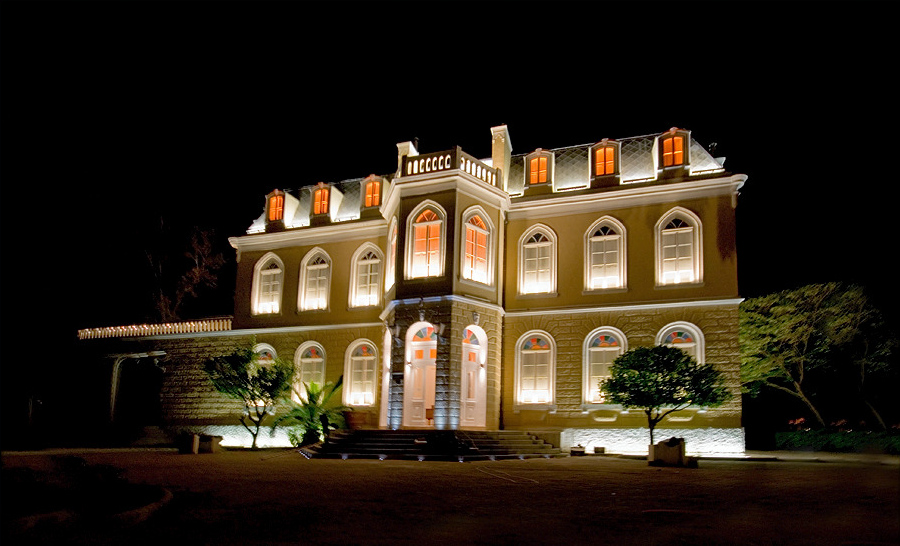
The palace of King Nicholas I of Montenegro in Bar

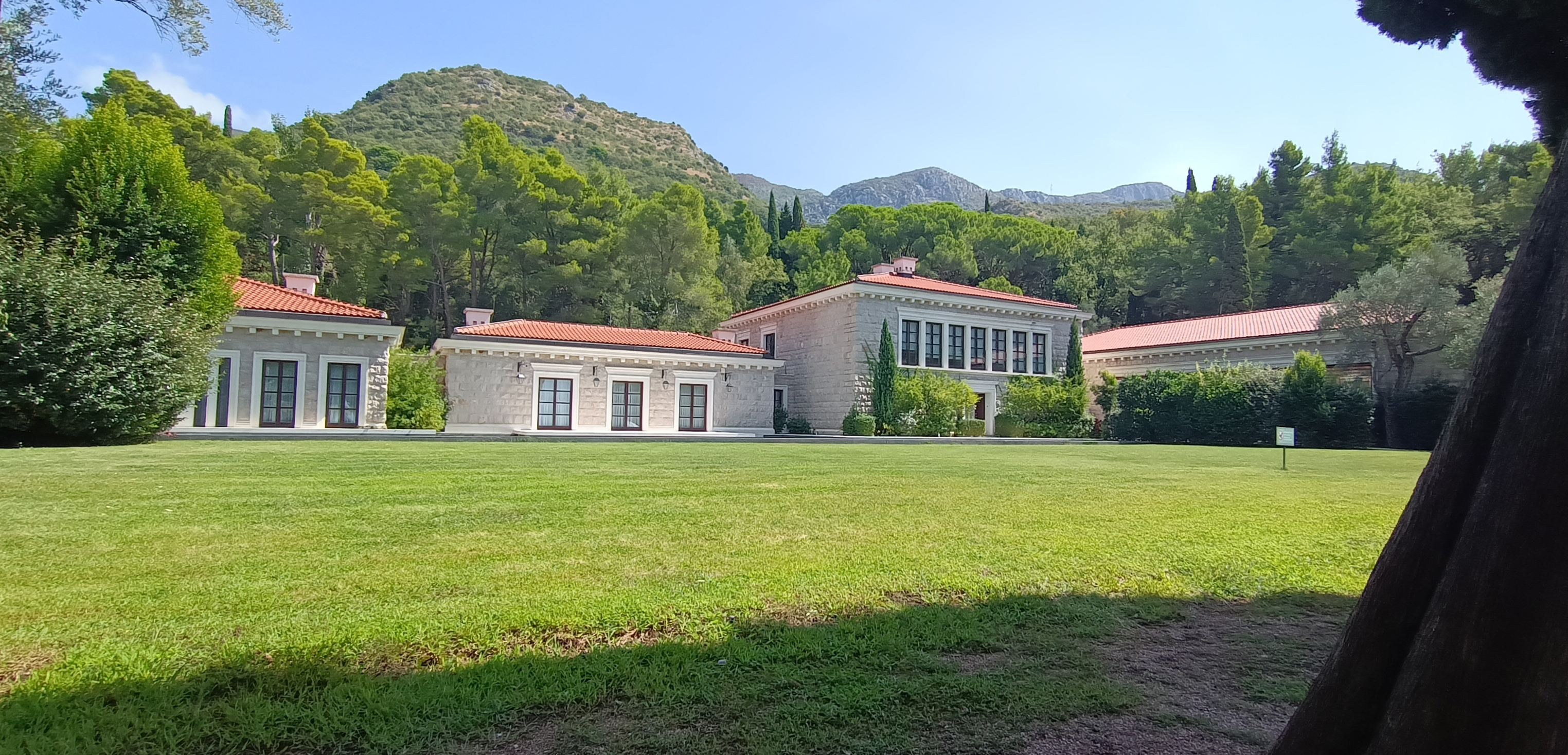
The palace of King Nicholas I of Montenegro on Kraljičina plaža (Queen's Beach) in Miločer, Budva Municipality

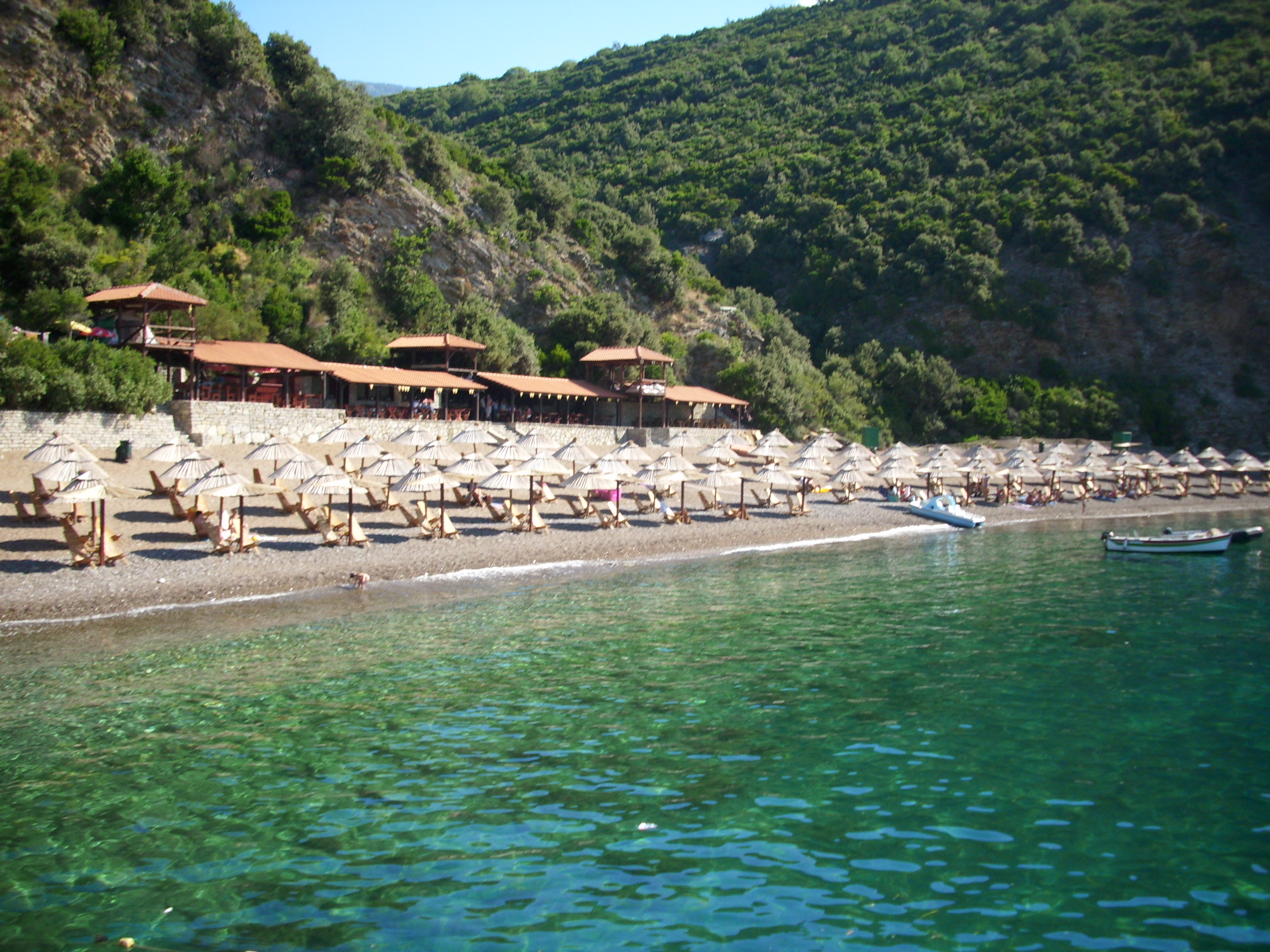
Queen's Beach near Čanj, Bar Municipality

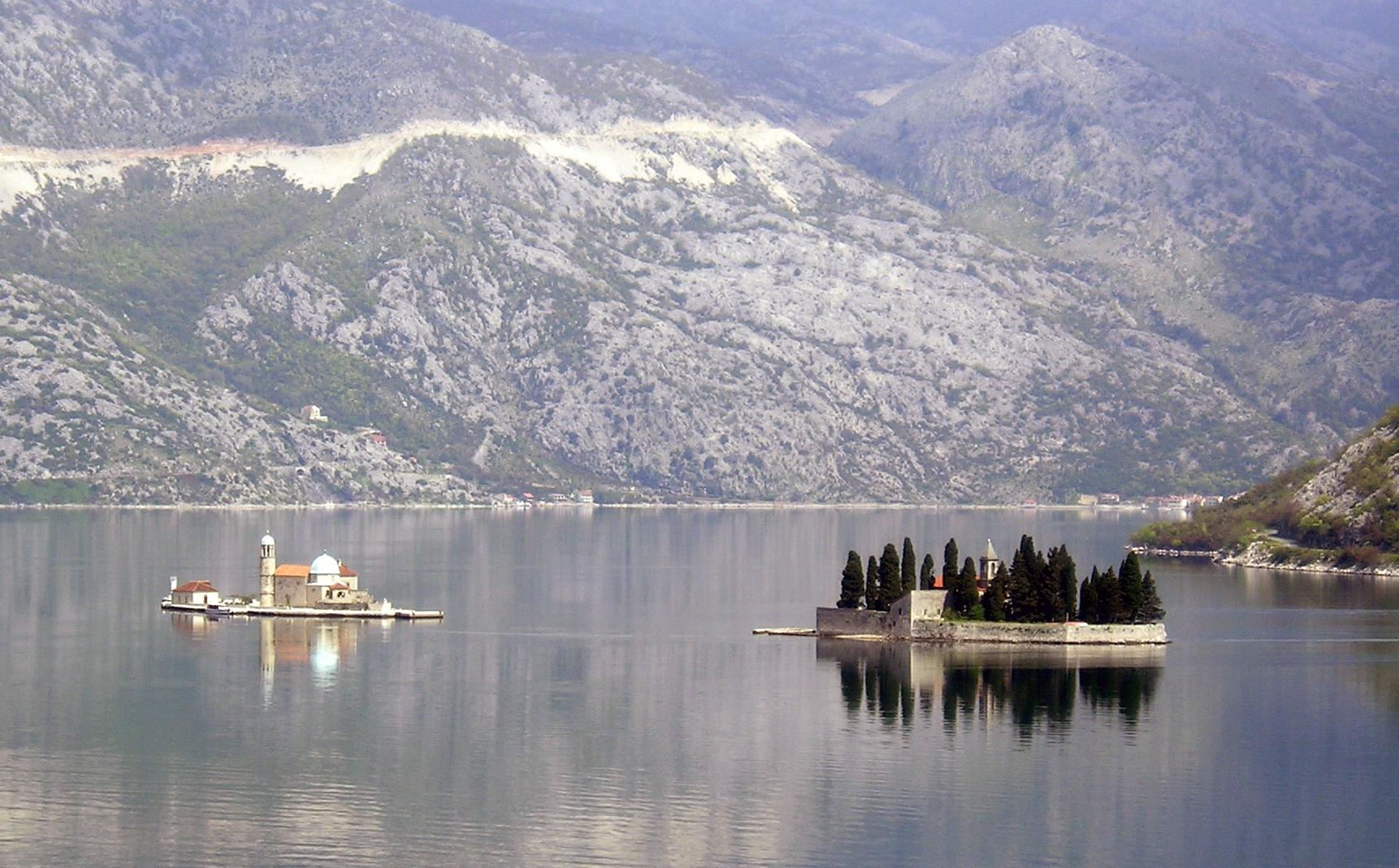
Our Lady of the Rocks, near Kotor

== See also ==
- Montenegro
