= Gornja Briska =

Gornja Briska Горња Бриска Brisku i Naltë
- Village
- Location within Montenegro
- Coordinates: 42.115556°N 19.220833°E
- Country: Montenegro
- Municipality: Bar

Population (2011)
  - Total: 22
- Time zone: UTC+1 (CET)
  - Summer (DST): UTC+2 (CEST)

Gornja Briska (Serbian Cyrillic: Горња Бриска; Albanian: Brisku i Naltë) is a village in the Šestani commune and Bar municipality of Montenegro.

== Demographics ==
According to the 2011 census, its population was 22.

Ethnicity in 2011
| Ethnicity | Number | Percentage |
|---|---|---|
| Montenegrins | 8 | 36.36% |
| Albanians | 14 | 63.67% |
| Total | 22 | 100% |
