= Grdovići =

Grdovići may refer to:

- Grdovići (Bar Municipality), Montenegro
- Grdovići (Arilje), Serbia
