= Mišići =

Mišići may refer to:

- Mišići (Bar Municipality), Montenegro
- "Mišići" (song), by Slovenian singer-songwriter Senidah
- Mišići, a village in Milići, Republika Srpska, Bosnia and Herzegovina
- mišići:
  - the Serbo-Croatian plural of mišić "muscle"
  - the Serbo-Croatian plural of mišić "small mouse"
