= Čeluga =

Čeluga Челуга Çelluga
- Town
- Location within Montenegro
- Coordinates: 42°04′31″N 19°06′28″E
- Country: Montenegro
- Municipality: Bar
- Elevation: 299 ft (91 m)

Population (2011)
  - Total: 1,481
- Time zone: UTC+1 (CET)
  - Summer (DST): UTC+2 (CEST)
- Postal code: 85353
- Area code: +382 30
- Car plates: BR

Čeluga (Cyrillic: Челуга; Albanian: Çelluga) is a settlement in the municipality of Bar, Montenegro. It is located approximately four kilometres from the city of Bar.

According to the 2011 census, its population was 1,481.

== Demographics ==
Population of Čeluga:

Historical population
Year	Pop.	±%
1948	272	—
1953	330	+21.3%
1961	364	+10.3%
1971	631	+73.4%
1981	921	+46.0%
1991	1,164	+26.4%
2003	1,404	+20.6%

Ethnicity in 2003
Ethnicity	Number	Percentage
Montenegrins	709	50.49%
Serbs	194	13.81%
Muslims	188	13.39%
Bosniaks	101	7.19%
Albanians	86	6.12%
Yugoslavs	12	0.85%
Croats	10	0.71%
Slovenes	1	0.07%
Macedonians	1	0.07%
Others	102	7.3%
Total	1,404	100%
