= Bartula =

Bartula Бартула Bartulla
- Village
- Location within Montenegro
- Coordinates: 42.083697°N 19.136847°E
- Country: Montenegro
- Municipality: Bar

Population (2011)
  - Total: 342
- Time zone: UTC+1 (CET)
  - Summer (DST): UTC+2 (CEST)

Bartula (Serbian Cyrillic: Бартула; Albanian: Bartulla) is a village in the municipality of Bar, Montenegro.

== Demographics ==
According to the 2011 census, its population was 342.

Ethnicity in 2011
Ethnicity	Number	Percentage
Montenegrins	212	62.0%
Albanians	41	12.0%
Serbs	25	7.3%
other/undeclared	64	18.7%
Total	342	100%
