= Kunje (Bar) =

Kunje Куње
- Village
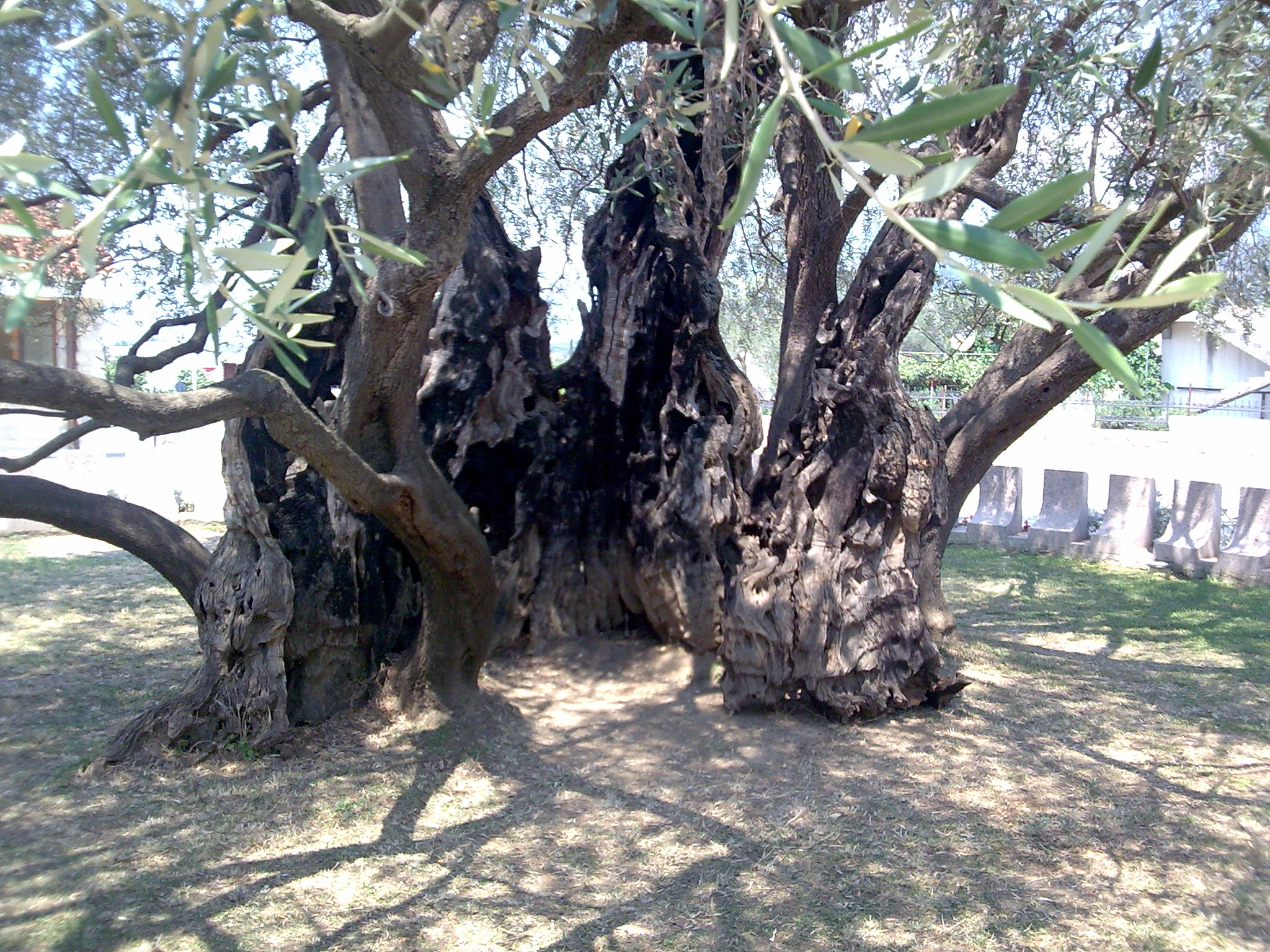
- Kunje Montenegro.panoramio.jpg

- Location within Montenegro
- Coordinates: 42.013114°N 19.183231°E
- Country: Montenegro
- Municipality: Bar

Population (2011)
  - Total: 415
- Time zone: UTC+1 (CET)
  - Summer (DST): UTC+2 (CEST)

Kunje (Serbian Cyrillic: Куње) is a village in the municipality of Bar, Montenegro.

== Demographics ==
According to the 2011 census, its population was 415.

Ethnicity in 2011
Ethnicity	Number	Percentage
Montenegrins	148	35.7%
Serbs	50	12.0%
Russians	12	2.9%
other/undeclared	205	49.4%
Total	415	100%
