= Zagrađe, Bar =

Zagrađe Заграђе
- Village
- Location within Montenegro
- Country: Montenegro
- Municipality: Bar

Population (2011)
  - Total: 364
- Time zone: UTC+1 (CET)
  - Summer (DST): UTC+2 (CEST)

Zagradje (Montenegrin: Заграђе) is a village in the municipality of Bar, south Montenegro, located next to Sutomore. It is renowned for its air quality and beaches.

The village itself is on a hill to the west of Sutomore. A small single-track road leads up the hill. The mean house height in the area is around 100m and the highest house on the eastern slope of the hill is 184m above sea level (GPS data).

== Demographics ==
According to the 2011 census, its population was 364.

Ethnicity in 2011
Ethnicity	Number	Percentage
Serbs	159	43.7%
Montenegrins	146	40.1%
other/undeclared	59	16.2%
Total	364	100%

The population of the village is not fixed. In the winter, it can be as low as 5 (five), but in the summer (as it is a tourist location with many weekend-homes) its population can go up to 2000. As such, it is very quiet in the winter and over-populated in the summer.

== Weather ==
The winters are harsh. Winds of up to 160 kpm (100 mph) are not uncommon.

== Other information ==
The village was previously an army site, but since Montenegro's independence, the Yugoslavian army has moved out.

During NATO's bombardment of Serbia and Montenegro in 1999, a bomb dropped on one of the peninsulas close to the village, missed the army and hit a civilian area close to a beach. There is still radioactivity around the area.

Some of the beaches have a radioactive mud which is said to be a cure for many bodily issues related to bones and skin. This has not been proven to-date however.
