= Tomba, Montenegro =

Tomba Томба Tombë
- Town
- Location within Montenegro
- Country: Montenegro
- Municipality: Bar

Population (2011)
  - Total: 1,187
- Time zone: UTC+1 (CET)
  - Summer (DST): UTC+2 (CEST)

Tomba (Montenegrin and Serbian: Томба; Albanian: Tombë) is a village in the municipality of Bar, Montenegro.

== Demographics ==
According to the 2011 census, its population was 1,187.

Ethnicity in 2011
Ethnicity	Number	Percentage
Montenegrins	683	57.5%
Serbs	115	9.7%
Albanians	110	9.3%
Bosniaks	52	4.4%
other/undeclared	227	19.1%
Total	1,187	100%
