= Polje, Bar =

Polje Поље
- Town
- Location within Montenegro
- Country: Montenegro
- Municipality: Bar

Population (2011)
  - Total: 1,869
- Time zone: UTC+1 (CET)
  - Summer (DST): UTC+2 (CEST)

Polje (Montenegrin and Serbian: Поље) is a village in the municipality of Bar, Montenegro.

== Demographics ==
According to the 2011 census, its population was 1,869.

Ethnicity in 2011
Ethnicity	Number	Percentage
Montenegrins	954	51.0%
Serbs	405	21.7%
other/undeclared	510	27.3%
Total	1,869	100%
