= Dobra Voda (Bar) =

Dobra Voda Миловандија
- Village
- Location within Montenegro
- Coordinates: 42.043909°N 19.143158°E
- Country: Montenegro
- Municipality: Bar

Population (2011)
  - Total: 1,046
- Time zone: UTC+1 (CET)
  - Summer (DST): UTC+2 (CEST)

Dobra Voda (Cyrillic: Добра Вода) is a village in the municipality of Bar, Montenegro.

== Demographics ==
According to the 2011 census, its population was 1,046.

Ethnicity in 2011
Ethnicity	Number	Percentage
Montenegrins	369	35.3%
Bosniaks	148	14.1%
Serbs	62	5.9%
Albanians	28	2.7%
other/undeclared	439	42.0%
Total	1,046	100%
