= Velje Selo =

Velje Selo Веље Село
- Village
- Location within Montenegro
- Coordinates: 42.033002°N 19.198312°E
- Country: Montenegro
- Municipality: Bar

Population (2011)
  - Total: 233
- Time zone: UTC+1 (CET)
  - Summer (DST): UTC+2 (CEST)

Velje Selo (Montenegrin Cyrillic: Веље Село) is a village in the municipality of Bar, Montenegro.

== Demographics ==
According to the 2011 census, its population was 233.

Ethnicity in 2011
Ethnicity	Number	Percentage
Montenegrins	86	36.9%
other/undeclared	147	63.1%
Total	233	100%
