= Pečurice =

Pečurice Печурице
- Village
- Location within Montenegro
- Coordinates: 42.031023°N 19.173232°E
- Country: Montenegro
- Municipality: Bar

Population (2011)
  - Total: 573
- Time zone: UTC+1 (CET)
  - Summer (DST): UTC+2 (CEST)

Pečurice (Cyrillic: Печурице) is a village in the municipality of Bar, Montenegro, located approximately 9.4 km from Bar's capital city Bar.

== Demographics ==
According to the 2011 census, its population was 573.

Ethnicity in 2011
Ethnicity	Number	Percentage
Bosniaks	125	21.8%
Montenegrins	96	16.8%
Serbs	72	12.6%
Albanians	13	2.3%
other/undeclared	267	46.6%
Total	573	100%
