= Dabezići =

Dabezići Дабезићи
- Village
- Location within Montenegro
- Coordinates: 42.037317°N 19.207503°E
- Country: Montenegro
- Municipality: Bar

Population (2011)
  - Total: 160
- Time zone: UTC+1 (CET)
  - Summer (DST): UTC+2 (CEST)

Dabezići (Serbian Cyrillic: Дабезићи) is a village in the municipality of Bar, Montenegro.

== Demographics ==
According to the 2011 census, its population was 160.

Ethnicity in 2011
Ethnicity	Number	Percentage
Montenegrins	68	42.5%
other/undeclared	92	57.5%
Total	160	100%
