= Pelinkovići =

Pelinkovići Пелинковићи Pelika
- Village
- Location within Montenegro
- Coordinates: 42.003333°N 19.234333°E
- Country: Montenegro
- Municipality: Bar

Population (2011)
  - Total: 141
- Time zone: UTC+1 (CET)
  - Summer (DST): UTC+2 (CEST)

Pelinkovići (Serbian Cyrillic: Пелинковићи; Albanian: Pelika) is a village in the municipality of Bar, Montenegro.

== Demographics ==
According to the 2011 census, its population was 141.

Ethnicity in 2011
Ethnicity	Number	Percentage
Montenegrins	83	58.9%
Albanians	12	8.5%
other/undeclared	46	32.6%
Total	141	100%
