= Čanj =

Čanj Чањ
- Village
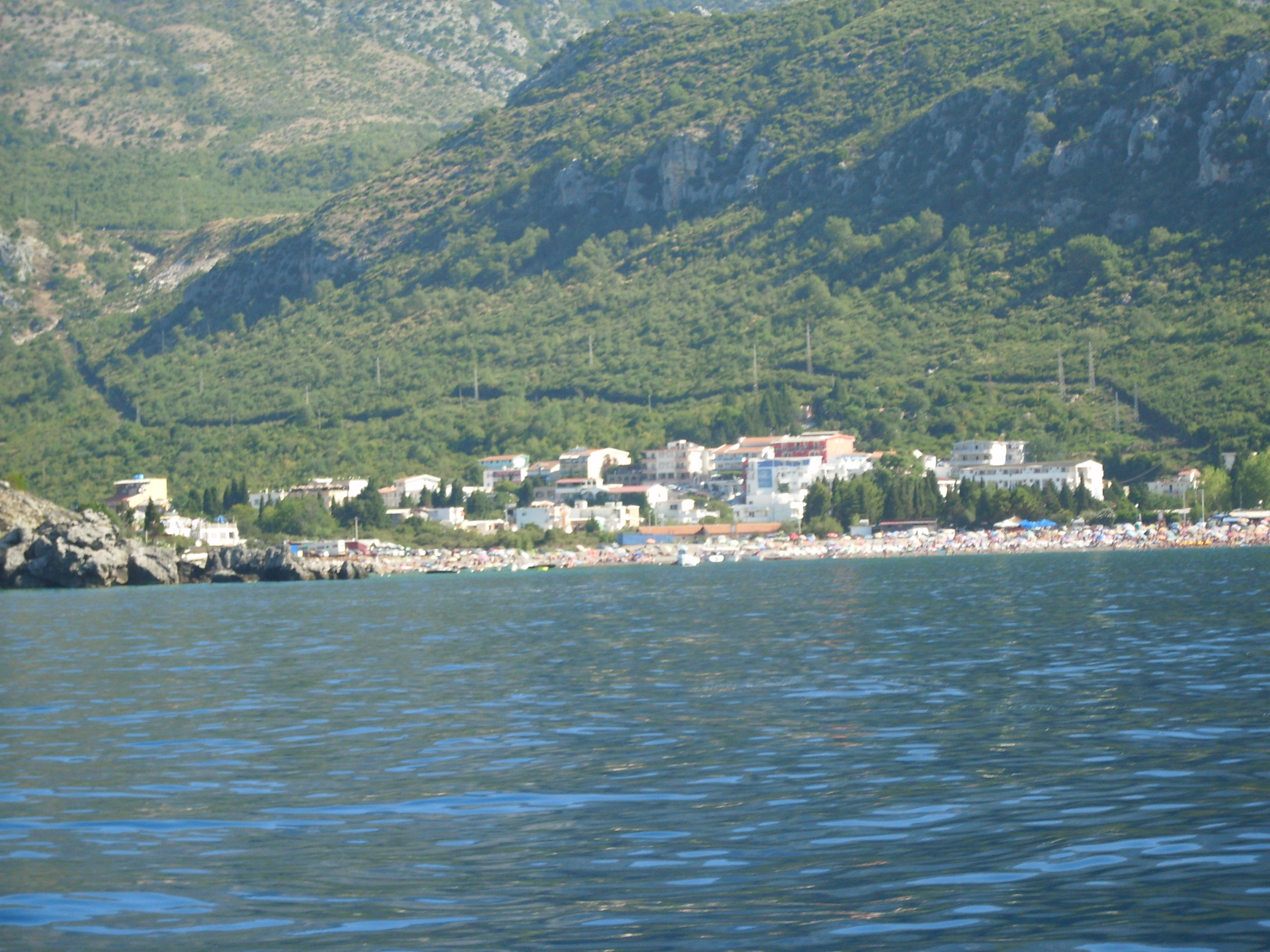
- View of Čanj

- Location within Montenegro
- Country: Montenegro
- Municipality: Bar
- Time zone: UTC+1 (CET)
  - Summer (DST): UTC+2 (CEST)

Čanj (Serbian Cyrillic: Чањ) is a small tourist settlement and town, located in the Bar Municipality in the southern Montenegrin littoral region.

In Čanj there is a complex of hotels and cottages. In the summer the town has many tourists staying in the local accommodations. Meanwhile, bars, restaurants and shops are also open throughout the warmer months. The settlement extends along the isolated coast for about 1200 metres. The town's main beach is called Biserna Obala (The Pearl Coast) and its popular with local residents and tourists.

The settlement is also situated on the Adriatic coast approximately halfway between the town of Petrovac (part of the Budva Municipality) and the city of Bar, very close to the main road that connects these two settlements.
