= Burtaiši =

Burtaiši Буртаиши
- Town
- Location within Montenegro
- Coordinates: 42°5′25″N 19°6′29″E
- Country: Montenegro
- Municipality: Bar

Population (2011)
  - Total: 3,800
- Time zone: UTC+1 (CET)
  - Summer (DST): UTC+2 (CEST)

Burtaiši (Montenegrin: Буртаиши) is a village in the municipality of Bar, Montenegro.

== Demographics ==
According to the 2011 census, its population was 3,800.

Ethnicity in 2011
Ethnicity	Number	Percentage
Montenegrins	1707	44.9%
Serbs	1072	28.2%
Bosniaks	438	11.5%
other/undeclared	583	15.3%
Total	3800	100%
