= Sustaš =

Sustaš Сусташ
- Village
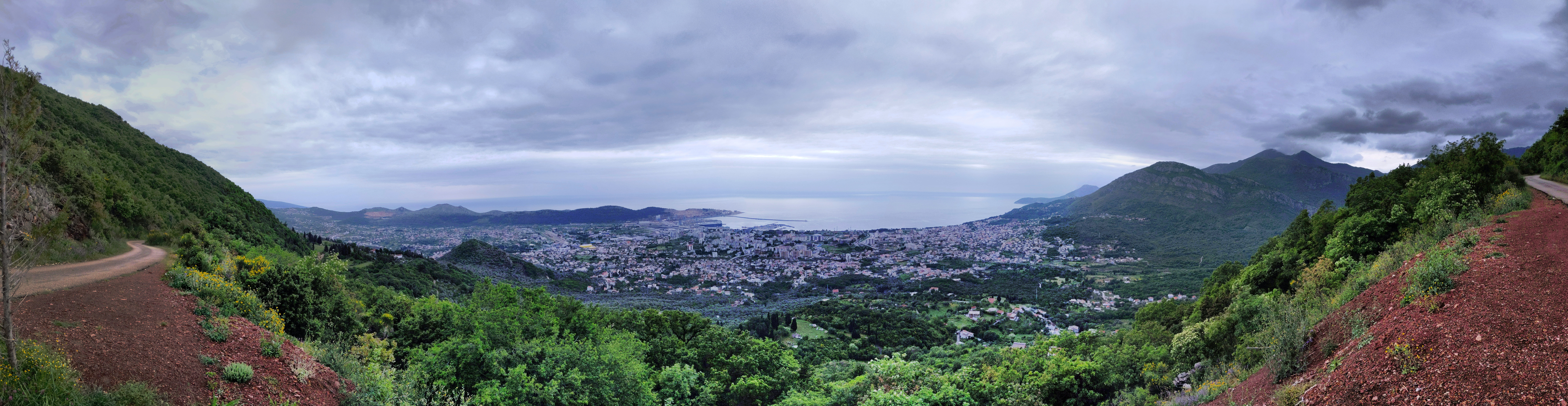
- A view of Sustaš, Bar and surrounding villages

- Location within Montenegro
- Coordinates: 42.111838°N 19.119213°E
- Country: Montenegro
- Municipality: Bar

Population (2011)
  - Total: 498
- Time zone: UTC+1 (CET)
  - Summer (DST): UTC+2 (CEST)

Sustaš (Montenegrin Cyrillic: Добра Вода) is a village in the municipality of Bar, Montenegro.

== Demographics ==
According to the 2011 census, its population was 498.

Ethnicity in 2011
Ethnicity	Number	Percentage
Montenegrins	277	55.6%
Bosniaks	75	15.1%
Serbs	55	5.9%
Albanians	9	11.0%
other/undeclared	82	16.5%
Total	498	100%
