= Tuđemili =

Tuđemili Туђемили
- Village
- Location within Montenegro
- Coordinates: 42.133717°N 19.144857°E
- Country: Montenegro
- Municipality: Bar

Population (2011)
  - Total: 146
- Time zone: UTC+1 (CET)
  - Summer (DST): UTC+2 (CEST)

Tuđemili (Montenegrin: Туђемили) is a village in the municipality of Bar, Montenegro.

== Demographics ==
According to the 2011 census, its population was 146.

Ethnicity in 2011
Ethnicity	Number	Percentage
Montenegrins	117	80.1%
Serbs	7	4.8%
other/undeclared	22	15.1%
Total	146	100%
