= Bjeliši =

Bjeliši Бјелиши
- Town
- Location within Montenegro
- Coordinates: 42°06′03″N 19°06′15″E
- Country: Montenegro
- Municipality: Bar

Population (2011)
  - Total: 1,712
- Time zone: UTC+1 (CET)
  - Summer (DST): UTC+2 (CEST)

Bjeliši (Montenegrin: Бјелиши) is a village in the municipality of Bar, Montenegro.

== Demographics ==
According to the 2011 census, its population was 1712.

Ethnicity in 2011
Ethnicity	Number	Percentage
Montenegrins	773	45.1%
Serbs	531	31.0%
other/undeclared	408	23.8%
Total	1712	100%
