= Velembusi =

Velembusi Велембуси
- Village
- Location within Montenegro
- Coordinates: 42.099671°N 19.130434°E
- Country: Montenegro
- Municipality: Bar

Population (2011)
  - Total: 911
- Time zone: UTC+1 (CET)
  - Summer (DST): UTC+2 (CEST)

Velembusi (Montenegrin Cyrillic: Велембуси) is a village in the municipality of Bar, Montenegro.

== Demographics ==
According to the 2011 census, its population was 911.

Ethnicity in 2011
Ethnicity	Number	Percentage
Montenegrins	470	51.6%
Serbs	189	20.7%
Bosniaks	58	6.2%
other/undeclared	194	21.3%
Total	911	100%
