= Boljevići (Bar Municipality) =

Boljevići Бољевићи
- Village
- Location within Montenegro
- Coordinates: 42.223953°N 19.088441°E
- Country: Montenegro
- Municipality: Bar

Population (2011)
  - Total: 181
- Time zone: UTC+1 (CET)
  - Summer (DST): UTC+2 (CEST)

Boljevići (Montenegrin: Бољевићи) is a village in the municipality of Bar, Montenegro.

== Demographics ==
According to the 2011 census, its population was 181.

Ethnicity in 2011
Ethnicity	Number	Percentage
Montenegrins	111	61.3%
Serbs	58	32.0%
other/undeclared	12	6.6%
Total	181	100%
