= Godinje =

Godinje Годиње
- Village
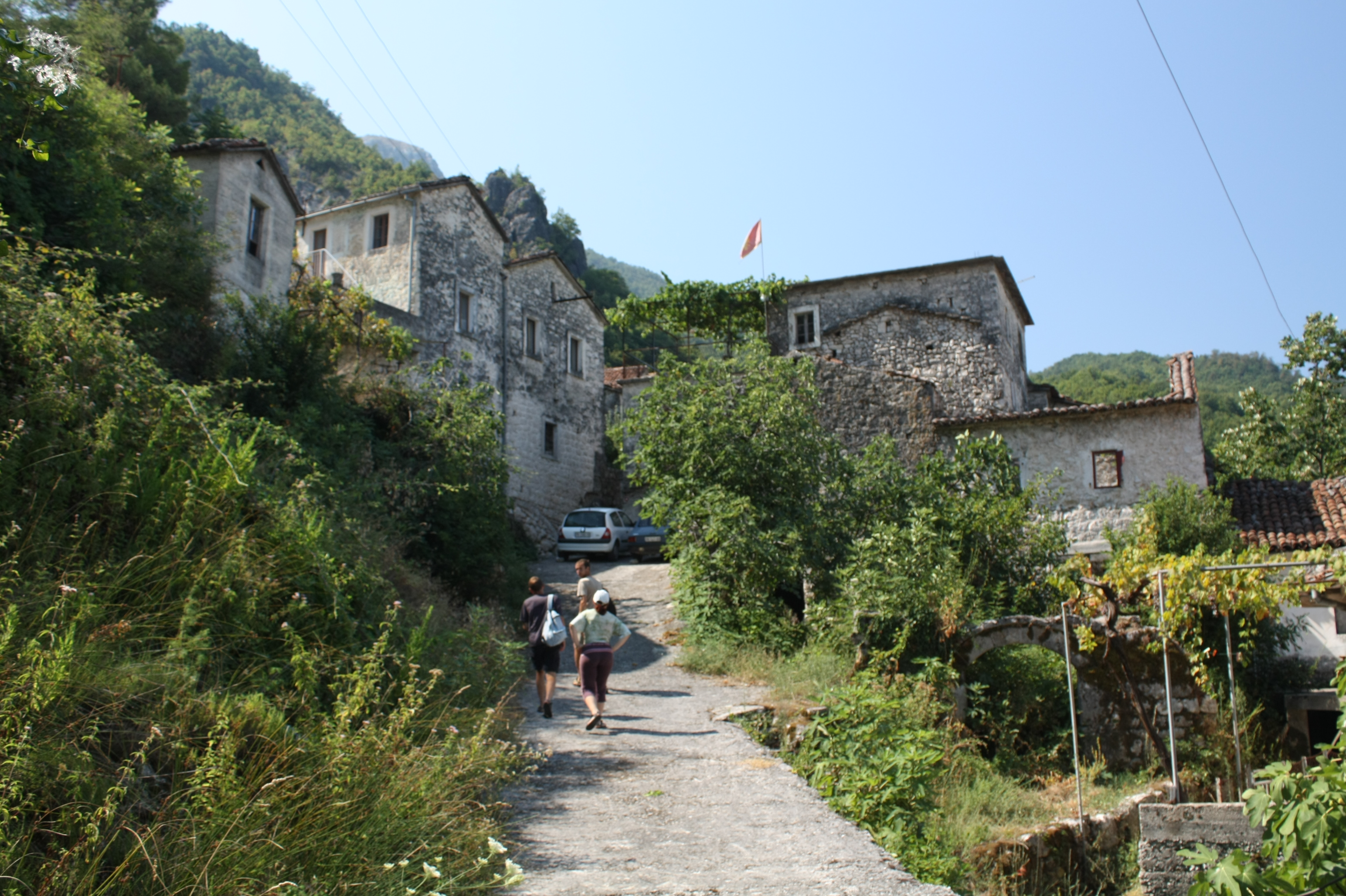
- Godinje, Montenegro - old village

- Location within Montenegro
- Country: Montenegro
- Municipality: Bar

Population (2011)
  - Total: 49
- Time zone: UTC+1 (CET)
  - Summer (DST): UTC+2 (CEST)

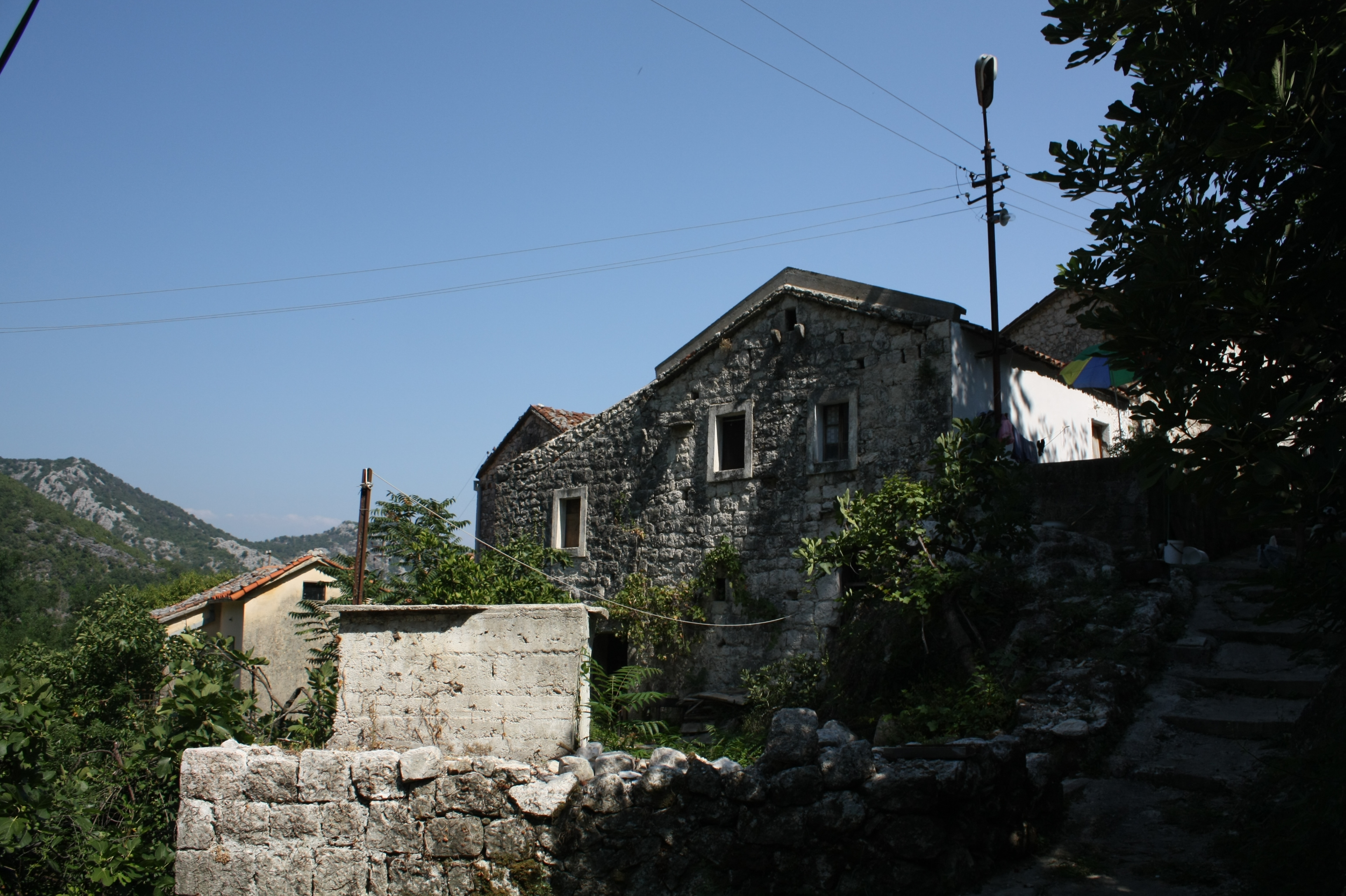
Godinje, Montenegro - old village

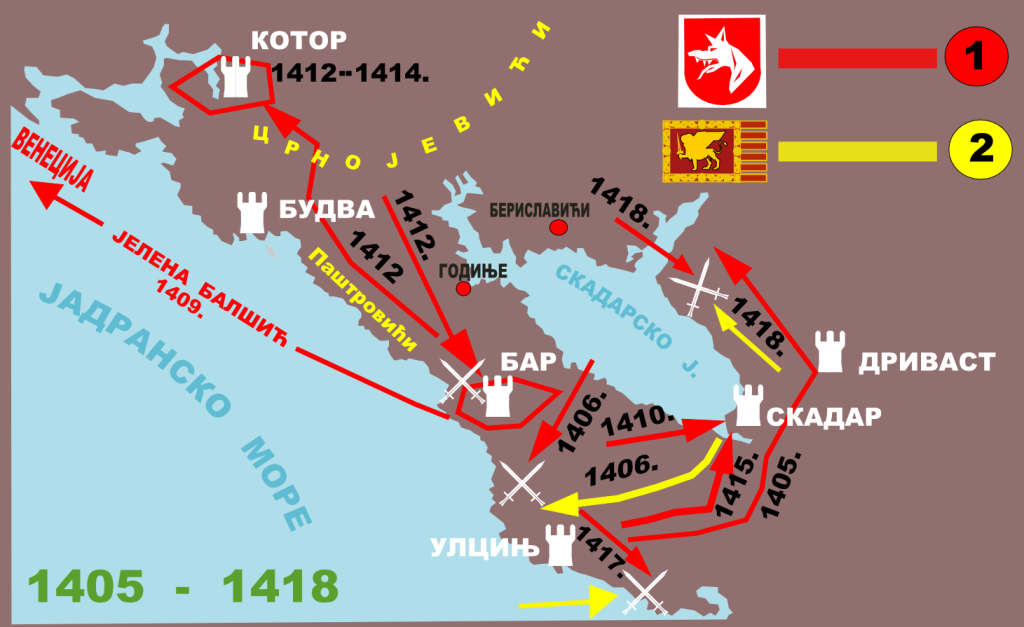
Temporary "palaces" of Balša III Balšić in Godinje and Berislavić, during the war with Venice

Godinje (Montenegrin Cyrillic: Годиње) is a village in the municipality of Bar, Montenegro. It is located on a hill overlooking Lake Skadar.

The village is the ancestral home of the Lekovići and Nikač brotherhoods. In 1977, residents of Godinje would say in a joking manner that: "In Godinje, everyone's surname is Leković". A reminder of a time when family clans lived in mountainous isolation in Montenegro.

== Demographics ==
According to the 2011 census, its population was 49.

Ethnicity in 2011
Ethnicity	Number	Percentage
Montenegrins	25	51.0%
Serbs	13	26.5%
other/undeclared	11	22.4%
Total	49	100%

=== Ancestral homes ===
- Central: Lekovići (45 houses)
- East: Perazići (19 houses)
- West: Velovići (4 houses)
- West: Nikači (17 houses).
