= Mišići (Bar Municipality) =

Mišići Мишићи
- Village
- Location within Montenegro
- Coordinates: 42.166472°N 19.012630°E
- Country: Montenegro
- Municipality: Bar

Population (2011)
  - Total: 224
- Time zone: UTC+1 (CET)
  - Summer (DST): UTC+2 (CEST)

Mišići (Cyrillic: Мишићи) is a village in the municipality of Bar, Montenegro.

== Demographics ==
According to the 2011 census, its population was 224.

Ethnicity in 2011
Ethnicity	Number	Percentage
Serbs	106	47.3%
Montenegrins	101	45.1%
other/undeclared	17	7.6%
Total	224	100%
