= Seoca, Bar =

Seoca Сеоца
- Location within Montenegro
- Coordinates: 42.2184°N 19.1404°E
- Country: Montenegro
- Municipality: Bar

Population (2011)
  - Total: 34
- Time zone: UTC+1 (CET)
  - Summer (DST): UTC+2 (CEST)
- ISO 3166-2 code: ME-02
- Climate: Csa

Seoca (Montenegrin Cyrillic: Сеоца) is a town in the municipality of Bar, Montenegro.

== Demographics ==
According to the 2011 census, its population was 34.

Ethnicity in 2011
Ethnicity	Number	Percentage
Montenegrins	32	94.1%
other/undeclared	2	5.9%
Total	34	100%
