= Miljevci (Bar Municipality) =

Miljevci Миљевци
- Village
- Location within Montenegro
- Coordinates: 42.142608°N 19.050390°E
- Country: Montenegro
- Municipality: Bar

Population (2011)
  - Total: 340
- Time zone: UTC+1 (CET)
  - Summer (DST): UTC+2 (CEST)

Miljevci (Cyrillic: Миљевци) is a village in the municipality of Bar, Montenegro.

== Demographics ==
According to the 2011 census, its population was 340.

Ethnicity in 2011
Ethnicity	Number	Percentage
Serbs	155	45.6%
Montenegrins	128	37.6%
Russians	6	1.8%
other/undeclared	51	15.0%
Total	340	100%
