= Grdovići (Bar Municipality) =

Grdovići Грдовићи
- Village
- Location within Montenegro
- Coordinates: 42.084882°N 19.321622°E
- Country: Montenegro
- Municipality: Bar

Population (2011)
  - Total: 175
- Time zone: UTC+1 (CET)
  - Summer (DST): UTC+2 (CEST)

Grdovići (Montenegrin Cyrillic: Грдовићи) is a village in the municipality of Bar, Montenegro. It is located in the Skadarska Krajina region, by Lake Skadar.

== Demographics ==
According to the 2011 census, its population was 175.

Ethnicity in 2011
Ethnicity	Number	Percentage
Montenegrins	62	35.4%
other/undeclared	113	64.6%
Total	175	100%
