= Zgrade =

Zgrade Зграде
- Village
- Location within Montenegro
- Coordinates: 42.147660°N 19.040101°E
- Country: Montenegro
- Municipality: Bar

Population (2011)
  - Total: 512
- Time zone: UTC+1 (CET)
  - Summer (DST): UTC+2 (CEST)

Zgrade (Montenegrin Cyrillic: Зграде) is a village in the municipality of Bar, Montenegro.

== Demographics ==
According to the 2011 census, its population was 512.

Ethnicity in 2011
Ethnicity	Number	Percentage
Montenegrins	222	43.4%
Serbs	211	41.2%
Croats	13	2.5%
other/undeclared	66	12.9%
Total	512	100%
