= Gluhi Do =

Gluhi Do Глухи До
- Village
- Location within Montenegro
- Coordinates: 42.202226°N 19.049022°E
- Country: Montenegro
- Municipality: Bar

Population (2011)
  - Total: 113
- Time zone: UTC+1 (CET)
  - Summer (DST): UTC+2 (CEST)

Gluhi Do (Montenegrin: Глухи До) is a village in the municipality of Bar, Montenegro.

== Demographics ==
According to the 2011 census, its population was 113.

Ethnicity in 2011
Ethnicity	Number	Percentage
Montenegrins	78	69.0%
Serbs	24	21.2%
other/undeclared	11	9.7%
Total	113	100%
