= Zankovići =

Zankovići Занковићи
- Village
- Location within Montenegro
- Coordinates: 42.144605°N 19.047802°E
- Country: Montenegro
- Municipality: Bar

Population (2011)
  - Total: 305
- Time zone: UTC+1 (CET)
  - Summer (DST): UTC+2 (CEST)

Zankovići (Montenegrin Cyrillic: Занковићи) is a village in the municipality of Bar, Montenegro.

== Demographics ==
According to the 2011 census, its population was 305.

Ethnicity in 2011
Ethnicity	Number	Percentage
Montenegrins	163	53.4%
Serbs	120	39.3%
other/undeclared	22	7.2%
Total	305	100%
