= Brca (Bar Municipality) =

Brca Брца
- Village
- Location within Montenegro
- Coordinates: 42.133176°N 19.065692°E
- Country: Montenegro
- Municipality: Bar

Population (2015)
  - Total: 278
- Time zone: UTC+1 (CET)
  - Summer (DST): UTC+2 (CEST)

Brca (Montenegrin: Брца) is a village in the municipality of Bar, Montenegro. This village is famous for Ratac Abbey and the Villa Brca, places known to many in Montenegro and the Bar Municipality.

== Demographics ==
According to the 2015 census, its population was 278.

Ethnicity in 2015
Ethnicity	Number	Percentage
Montenegrins	123	44.2%
Serbs	119	42.8%
Other/Undeclared	36	12.9%
Total	278	100%
