= Rumija =

Mountain in Montenegro

- Montenegrin: Румија; Albanian: Rumi
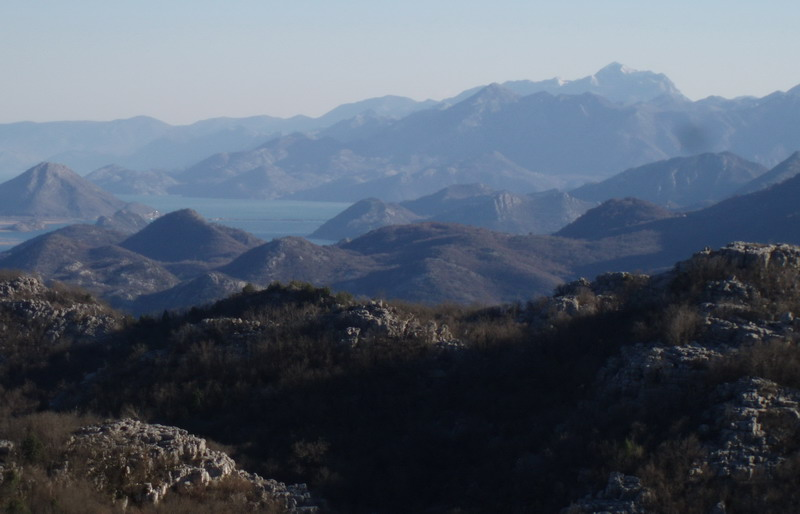

Highest point
- Elevation: 1,594 m (5,230 ft)
- Prominence: 1,500 m (4,900 ft)
- Coordinates: 42°6′10″N 19°11′37″E

Geography
- Location within Montenegro
- Location: southern Montenegro
- Parent range: Dinaric Alps

Rumija (Montenegrin: Румија, romanized: Rumija; Albanian: Rumi) is a mountain in southern Montenegro, situated between the Adriatic and Lake Skadar. The highest point is Rumija, which is 1,594 m (5,230 ft) high. Rumija rises above the town of Bar, and is a natural Dinaric barrier, separating the Adriatic from the Skadar basin. It is the southernmost mountain of Montenegro, and with prominence of 1,500 m (4,921 ft), one of the most prominent.

Mount Rumija is a site of great religious significance. The Cross of Jovan Vladimir is carried every year during August on the Feast of Pentecost from the village of Velji Mikulići to the summit of Rumija. Traditionally, in addition to Orthodox Christians of the Bar area, Catholics and Muslims also take part in the procession and ascent to the summit of Rumija. The pilgrimage has symbolised cooperation among the religions and ethnic groups within the country, even during difficult moments.

== Church controversy ==
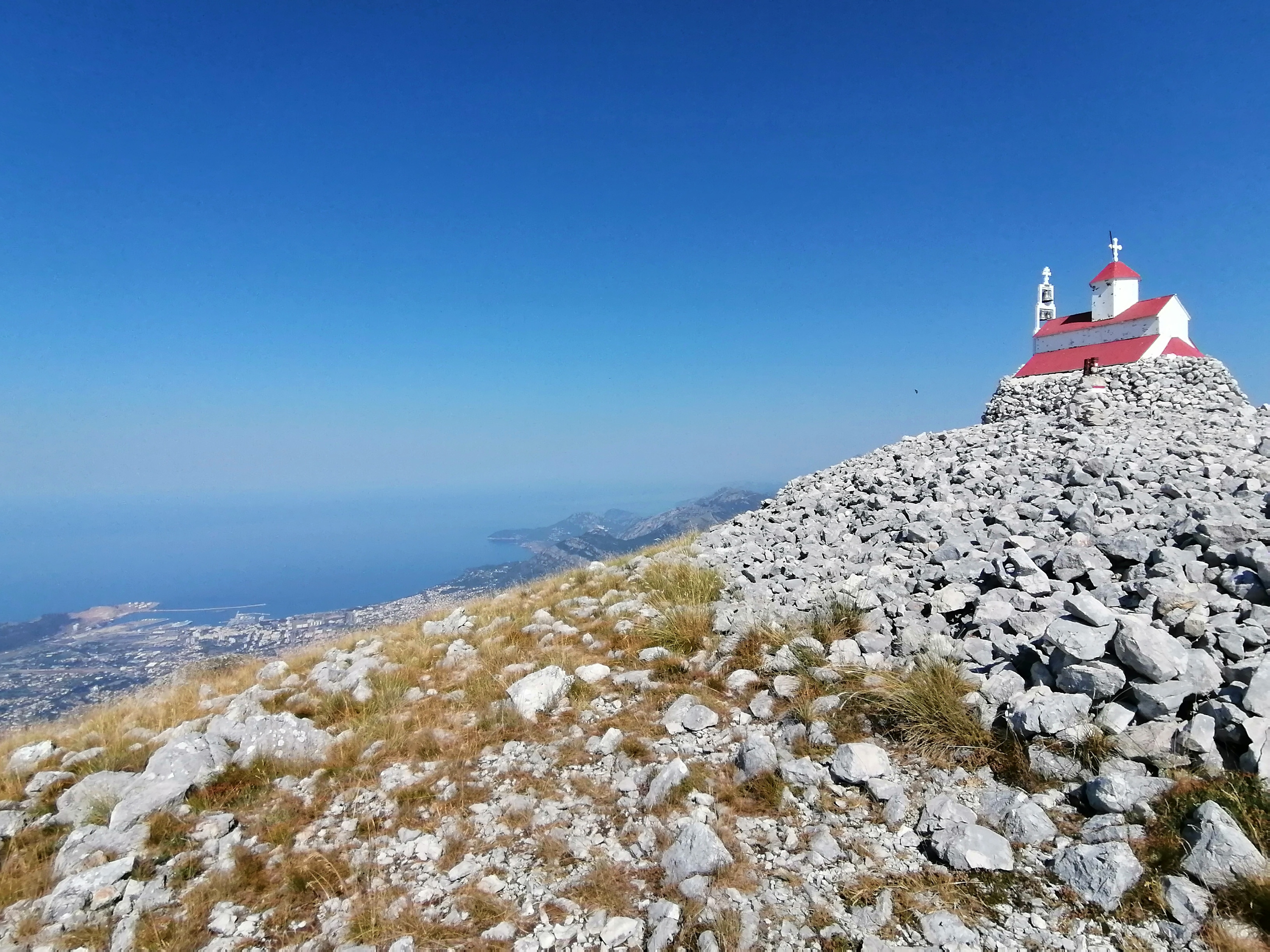
Small metal church atop the peak of Mt. Rumija

On 18 June 2005, a small prefabricated metal church was placed by a helicopter atop the summit of Mount Rumija by the 172nd Airborne Brigade of the Serbian and Montenegrin Army of Podgorica at the request of the Council Church of Podgorica, a dependent of the Orthodox Serb Metropolitan of Montenegro. The metal building is known as the Orthodox Church of the Holy Trinity. The symbolic action aimed at demonstrating the dominance of the Serbian Orthodox Church (SOC) over other religions and to reaffirm the Serbian character of Montenegro, the event also revealed the close links between Metropolitan Amfilohije and the army. The SOC stated that a former Orthodox church existed in that location until 1571, which was destroyed by the Ottomans. The SOC is against removal of the church. In letters addressed to politicians, Amfilohije stated to Milo Đukanović that any removal would be an act of vandalism and Patriarch Pavle asked Svetozar Marović "not to destroy the church that the Turks destroyed in 1571".

The installation of the church caused controversy, as construction of the church was not approved by Montenegrin authorities and the act generated anger from people that viewed Rumija as a symbol of religious harmony. The use of the Air Force helicopter was perceived by some people in Montenegro as a provocation in view of the anticipated 2006 Montenegrin independence referendum. Minority communities stated that Mt Rumija was for all religious and ethnic groups in the country. Montenegrin pro-independence organisations like the newly created Montenegrin Orthodox Church (MOC) and like-minded political parties interpreted the action as a threat toward the pursuit of independence and as the SOC designating ownership over locations in the country. The Doclean Academy of Sciences and Arts issued an announcement that accused Amfilohije of appropriating the location as a Serbian site and criticized the action as "vandalistic" and "clerico-fascist".

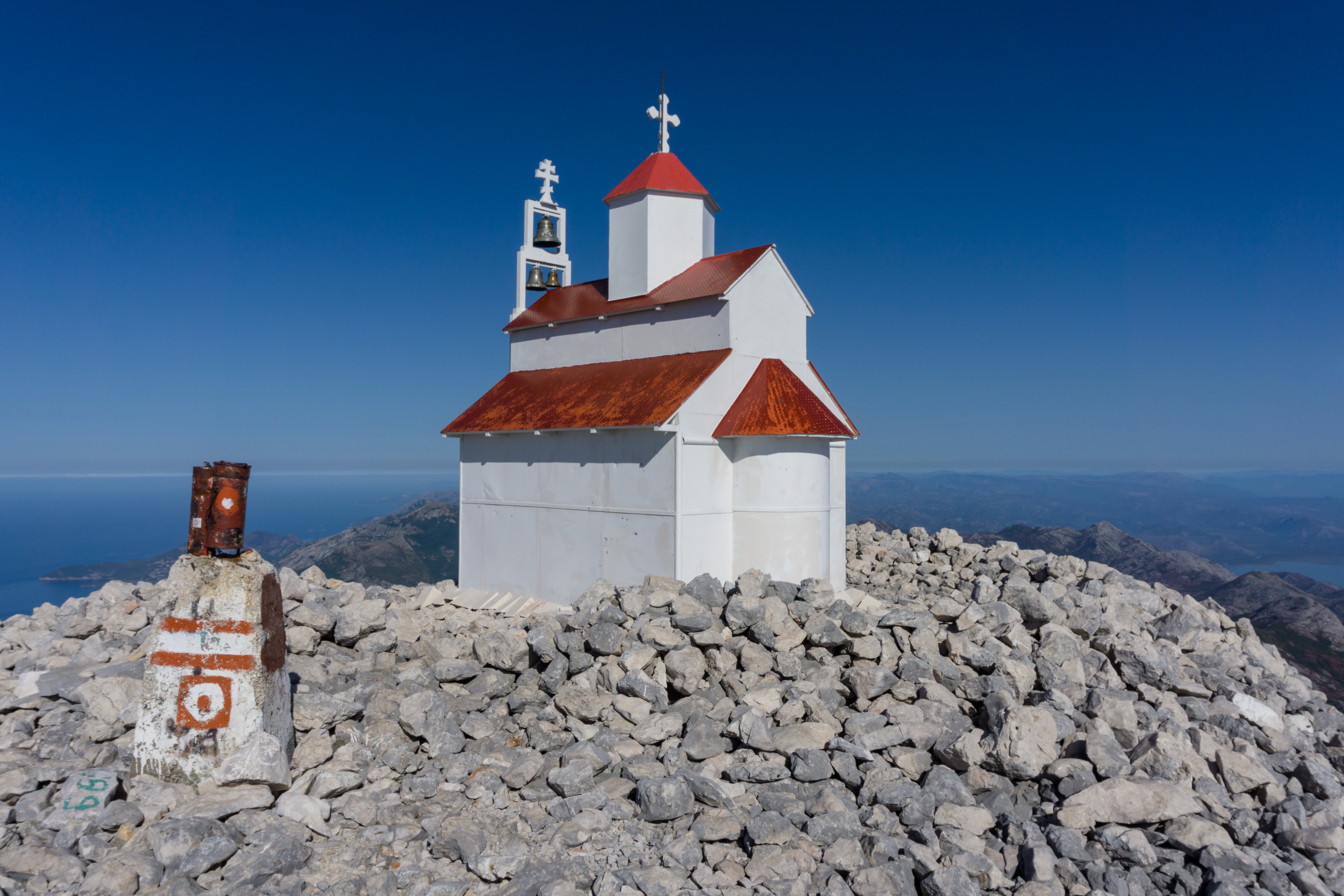
Small metal church atop the peak of Mt. Rumija.

The act was criticised in Montenegro by public figures such as Andrej Nikolaidis who stated there never was a church in that location and Amfilohije received negative press from Montenegrin media of appropriating the site for one faith to the exclusion of others and generating inter religious disharmony. The newspaper Vijesti, supporting Montenegrin independence, adopted a stance that reflected the position of Montenegrin authorities. Commentaries and reactions in Vijesti were mainly about the illegality of installing a church atop the summit and disruption of harmony among religions.

Vijesti also gave much space to minority spokespeople such as publishing the Albanian reaction by Montenegrin politician Mehmet Bardhi who stated that the action was the biggest provocation toward Albanians within a 50-year period. The MOC stated that the whole affair demonstrated the SOC's improper use of religion for political purposes. The newspaper Dan, against Montenegrin independence, published statements from ordinary people and the SOC that supported the church and were against its demolition by state authorities.

At the time in Montenegro, rumors existed that later were unfounded which claimed the SOC may attempt to install similar buildings atop other mountain peaks in the country. A decree that stipulated the demolition of the structure was adopted by the Montenegrin Ministry for Spatial Planning in 2009. The proposed removal of the church generated different positions among public opinion. A survey in 2011 found that 43% of respondents were against demolition and 23.7% supported removal. In the same survey the group against demolition was split along national affiliation lines, with 71% of respondents that identified as Serbs and 37% of those that identified as Montenegrins holding that position. A divergence exists between the government position on the issue and a large section of public opinion. Divisions over the church highlight its symbolism and attachment among people in Montenegro toward land as a location demarcating a sense of belonging.
