= Šestani =

Coordinates: 42.10068°N 19.159998°E

Shestan

Šestani (Albanian: Shestan, Serbian Cyrillic: Шестани) is a sub-region within the Skadarska Krajina region, in southernmost Montenegro. The region is a small mountain plateau of which terrace slopes towards the Skadar Lake. The region is predominantly populated by Albanians, many of whom are Muslims.

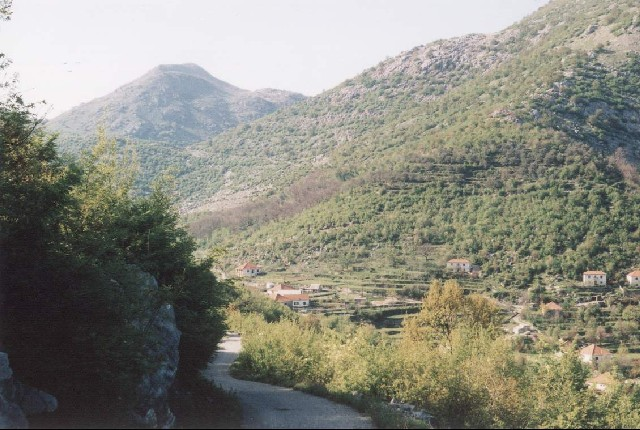
Ljare, village in Shestan

The Arbanasi people in the Zadar region are thought to have hailed from the villages of Briska (Brisk), Šestan (Shestan), Livari (Ljare), and Podi (Pod), having settled the Zadar area in 1726–27 and 1733 on the decision of Archbishop Vicko Zmajević of Zadar, in order to repopulate the land. The Dabovići in Dobra Voda and the Markići in Komina, both villages in Mrkojevići came from the Albanian-speaking region of Shestan.

The region was divided into two, and in 1876, Gornji Šestani encompassed the villages of Lukići (Lukaj), Dedići (Dedaj), Marvučići (Rud), Gurza (Gurrëzë) and Barlovići (Bardhaj), while Donji Šestani encompassed Ðuravci (Gjuraç), Karanikići (Nrekaj, Nenmal), Dračevica (Pecaj), Marstijepovići (Bujgër) and Vučedabići (Uçdabaj). In 1857, Šestani was inhabited by 579 people.

The Albanian dialect spoken in Shestan is part of the Northwestern Gheg group.

== Geography ==
Shestan is a sub-region and an extension of Krajina, encompassing some of the following villages and hamlets:

- Bapsulj /Babsul
- Besa / Besë
- Donja Briska / Brisk i Poshtëm
- Donji Murići / Muriq i Poshtëm
- Gornja Briska / Brisk i Nalt
- Gornji Murići / Muriq i Nalt
- Livari / Ljare
- Pinčići / Pinç
- Dedići / Dedaj
- Dračevica / Pecaj
- Gurza / Gurrëzë
- Karanikići / Nënmal
- Lukići / Lukaj

== Demographics ==
Population in Shestani according to censuses
Village name		Population							
Montenegrin	Albanian	1948	1953	1961	1971	1981	1991	2003	2011
Besa	Besë	152	167	179	235	246	272	67	41
Gornja Briska	Brisk i Nalt	121	139	143	137	85	92	20	22
Gornji Murići	Muriq i Nalt	101	95	155	114	96	124	25	12
Gurza	Gurrëz	74	87	47	39	26	15	-	-
Dedići	Dedaj	110	114	118	51	22	12	3	-
Donja Briska	Brisk i Poshtëm	99	116	109	129	130	145	46	29
Donji Murići	Muriq i Poshtëm	232	249	246	260	312	367	125	101
Dračevica	Pecaj	118	117	105	72	37	9	8	5
Đuravci	Gjuraç	86	81	74	64	36	36	11	4
Karanikići	Nënmal	99	104	98	57	30	20	5	6
Livari	Ljare	323	326	297	297	231	166	94	61
Lukići	Lukaj	89	76	70	54	25	12	-	-
Marstijepovići	Bujgër	70	65	68	47	25	16	-	-
Pinčići	Pinç	160	179	166	151	143	85	18	11
Total		1834	1915	1875	1707	1444	1371	422	292

== See also ==
- Albanians in Montenegro
- Hotski Hum
- Lower Zeta

== Sources ==
- Pregled geografske literature o Balkanskom poluostrvu za ...: Revue de la littérature géographique de la péninsule Balkanique. Državna štamparija kraljevine Srbije. 1895.
- Andrija Jovićević (1999). Zeta i Lješkopolje, Skadarsko jezero. CID. ISBN 9788649500907.
- Nikola Damjanović (1974). Virpazar, Bar, Ulcinj. Obod.
- Pleme Šestani: istorijsko-etnografska studija. Udruženje građana "Šestani". 2006. ISBN 978-86-908693-0-5.
