= List of populated places in Montenegro =

This is a list of populated places in Montenegro, sorted by municipality. Places with more than 1,000 residents are shown in italics. For each settlement with a significant Albanian population, the Albanian name for the settlement is given after a forward-slash (/).

== Andrijevica ==
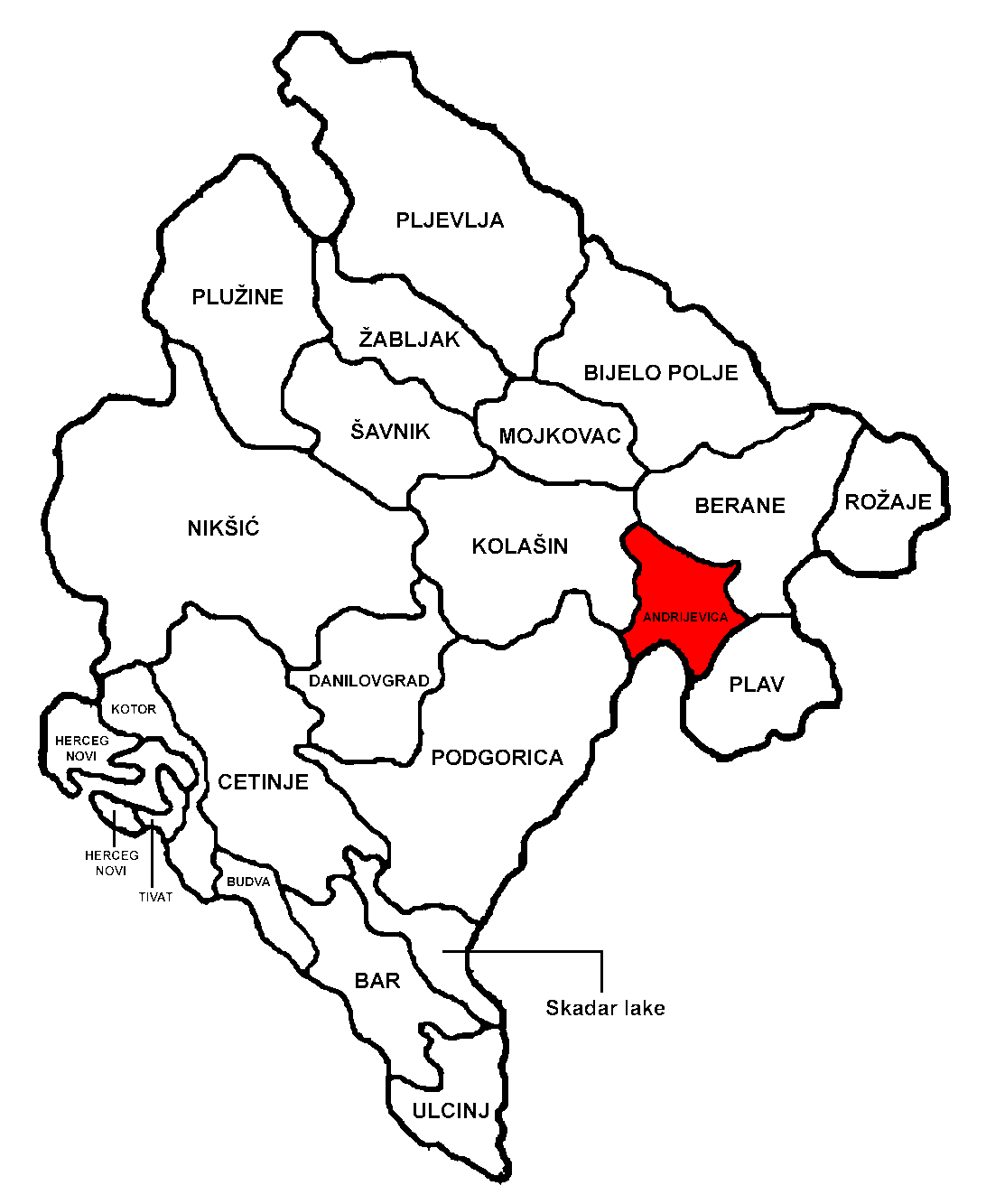
Andrijevica municipality

- Andrijevica
- Andželati
- Bojovići
- Božići
- Cecuni
- Đulići
- Dulipolje
- Gnjili Potok
- Gornje Luge
- Gračanica
- Jošanica
- Košutići
- Kralje
- Kuti
- Oblo Brdo
- Prisoja
- Rijeka Marsenića
- Seoca
- Sjenožeta
- Slatina
- Trepča
- Trešnjevo
- Ulotina
- Zabrđe

== Bar ==
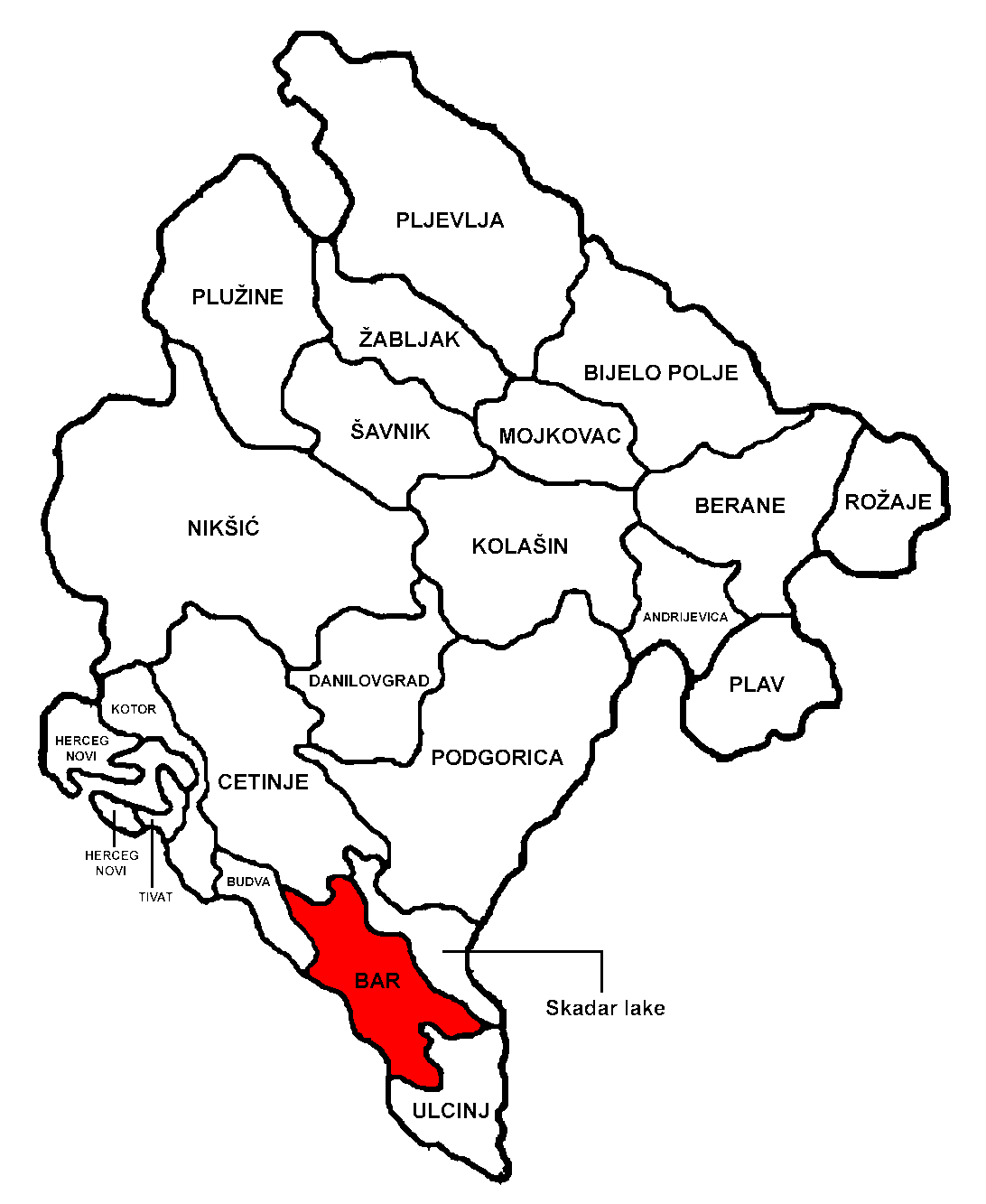
Bar municipality

- Arbnež
- Bar
- Bartula
- Besa
- Bjeliši
- Bobovište
- Boljevići
- Braćeni
- Brca
- Brijege
- Bukovik
- Burtaiši
- Čeluga
- Ckla
- Dabezići
- Dedići
- Đenđinovići
- Dobra Voda
- Donja Briska
- Donji Brčeli
- Donji Murići
- Dračevica
- Dupilo
- Đuravci
- Đurmani
- Gluhi Do
- Godinje
- Gornja Briska
- Gornji Brčeli
- Gornji Murići
- Grdovići
- Gurza
- Karanikići
- Komarno
- Koštanjica
- Krnjice
- Kruševica
- Kunje
- Limljani
- Livari
- Lukići
- Mačuge
- Mala Gorana
- Mali Mikulići
- Mali Ostros
- Marstijepovići
- Martići
- Miljevci
- Mišići
- Orahovo
- Ovtočići
- Papani
- Pečurice
- Pelinkovići
- Pinčići
- Podi
- Polje
- Popratnica
- Seoca
- Sotonići
- Sozina
- Stari Bar
- Šušanj
- Sustaš
- Sutomore
- Tejani
- Tomba
- Tomići
- Trnovo
- Tuđemili
- Turčini
- Utrg
- Velembusi
- Veliki Mikulići
- Veliki Ostros
- Velja Gorana
- Velje Selo
- Virpazar
- Vučedabići
- Zagrađe
- Zaljevo
- Zankovići
- Zgrade
- Zupci

== Berane ==
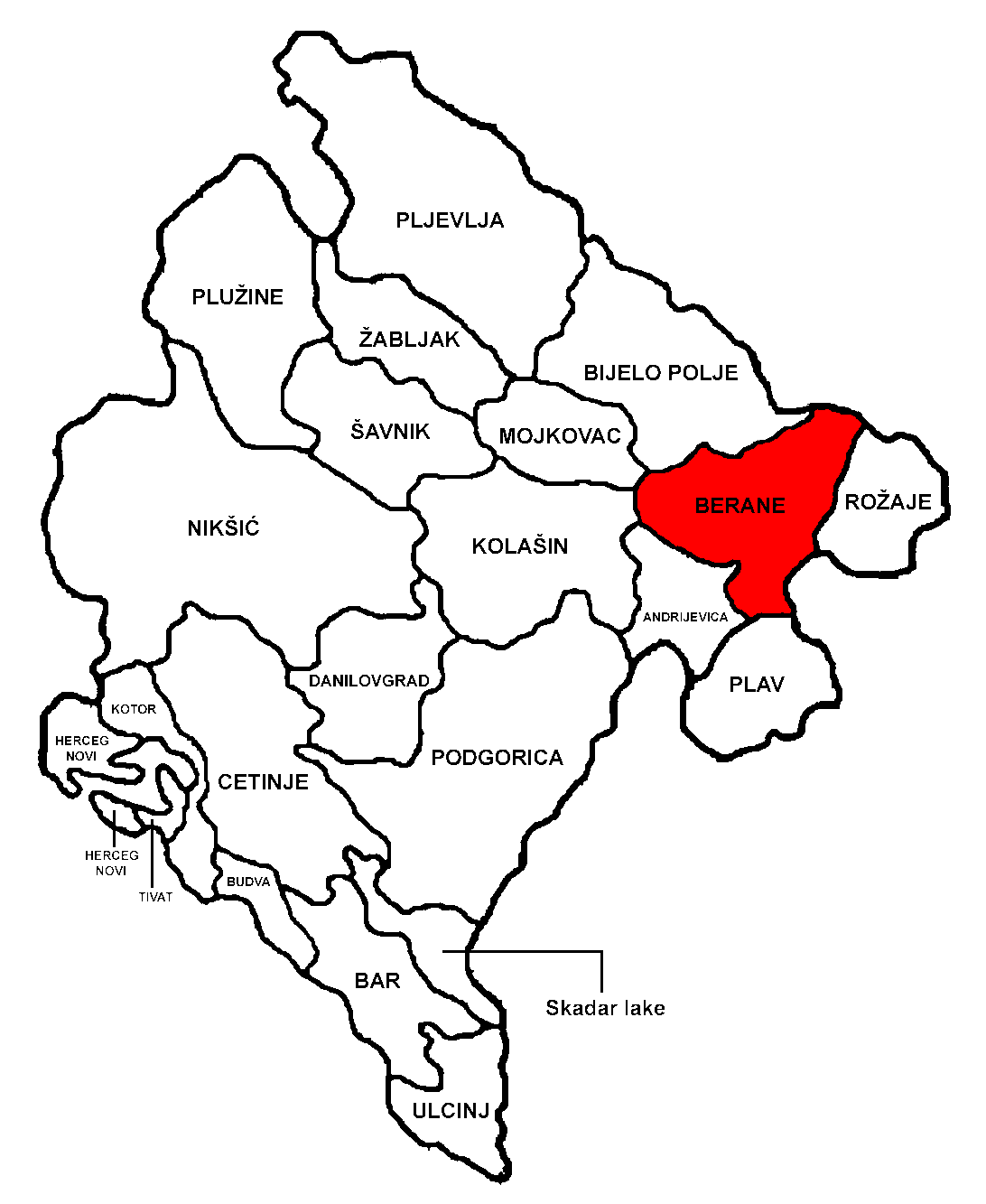
Berane municipality

- Babino
- Bastahe
- Beran Selo
- Berane
- Bubanje
- Buče
- Budimlja
- Crni Vrh
- Crvljevine
- Dapsići
- Dolac
- Donja Ržanica
- Donje Luge
- Donje Zaostro
- Dragosava
- Glavaca
- Goražde
- Gornje Zaostro
- Jašovići
- Kaludra
- Kurikuće
- Lazi
- Lubnice
- Lužac
- Mašte
- Mezgalji
- Orah
- Pešca
- Petnjik
- Praćevac
- Radmuževići
- Rovca
- Rujišta
- Skakavac
- Štitari
- Tmušići
- Veliđe
- Vinicka
- Vuča
- Zagorje
- Zagrad
- Zagrađe

== Bijelo Polje ==
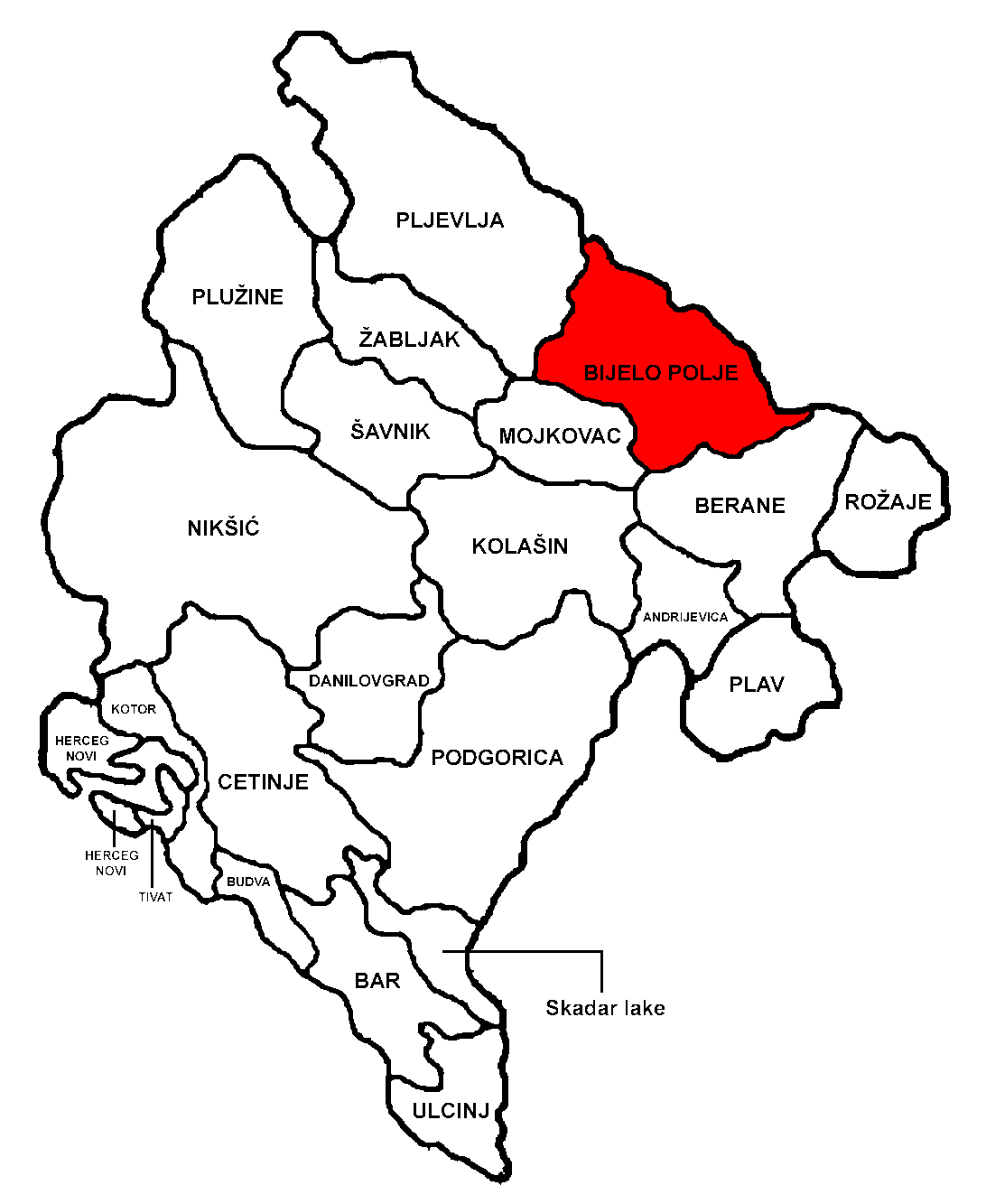
Bijelo Polje municipality

- Babaići
- Barice
- Bijedići
- Bijelo Polje
- Bliškovo
- Bojišta
- Boljanina
- Boturići
- Čeoče
- Cerovo
- Čokrlije
- Crhalj
- Crnča
- Crniš
- Đalovići
- Dobrakovo
- Dobrinje
- Dolac
- Dubovo
- Džafića Brdo
- Femića Krš
- Godijevo
- Goduša
- Grab
- Grančarevo
- Gubavač
- Ivanje
- Jablanovo
- Jabučno
- Jagoče
- Kanje
- Kičava
- Korita
- Kostenica
- Kostići
- Kovren
- Kukulje
- Laholo
- Lazovići
- Lekovina
- Lijeska
- Lješnica
- Lozna
- Loznica
- Majstorovina
- Metanjac
- Milovo
- Mioče
- Mirojevići
- Mojstir
- Mokri Lug
- Muslići
- Nedakusi
- Negobratina
- Njegnjevo
- Obrov
- Okladi
- Orahovica
- Osmanbegovo Selo
- Ostrelj
- Pali
- Pape
- Pavino Polje
- Pećarska
- Pobretići
- Poda
- Potkrajci
- Potrk
- Požeginja
- Prijelozi
- Pripčići
- Radojeva Glava
- Radulići
- Rakita
- Rakonje
- Rasovo
- Rastoka
- Ravna Rijeka
- Resnik
- Rodijelja
- Sadići
- Sela
- Sipanje
- Šipovice
- Sokolac
- Sutivan
- Srđevac
- Stožer
- Stubo
- Tomaševo
- Trubine
- Ujniče
- Unevine
- Voljavac
- Vrh
- Zaton
- Žiljak
- Zminac
- Žurena

== Budva ==
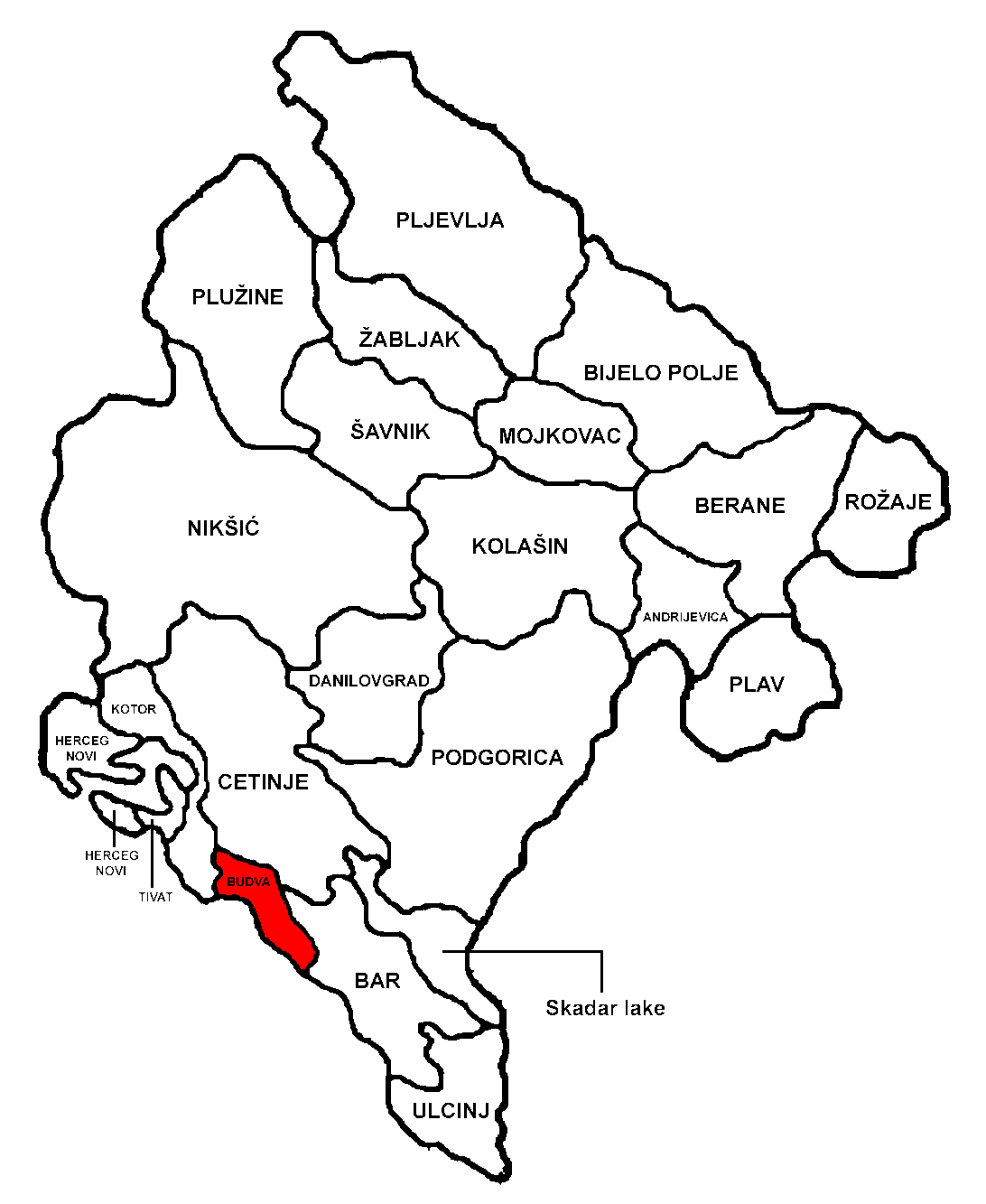
Budva municipality

- Bečići
- Blizikuće
- Boreti
- Brajići
- Brda
- Budva
- Buljarica
- Čami Do
- Čelobrdo
- Čučuke
- Đenaši
- Drobnići
- Ilino Brdo
- Kaluđerac
- Katun Reževići
- Krstac
- Kuljače
- Lapčići
- Markovići
- Novoselje
- Petrovac
- Pobori
- Podbabac
- Podostrog
- Prijevor
- Pržno
- Rađenovići
- Rijeka Reževići
- Stanišići
- Sveti Stefan
- Tudorovići
- Viti Do
- Žukovica

== Cetinje ==
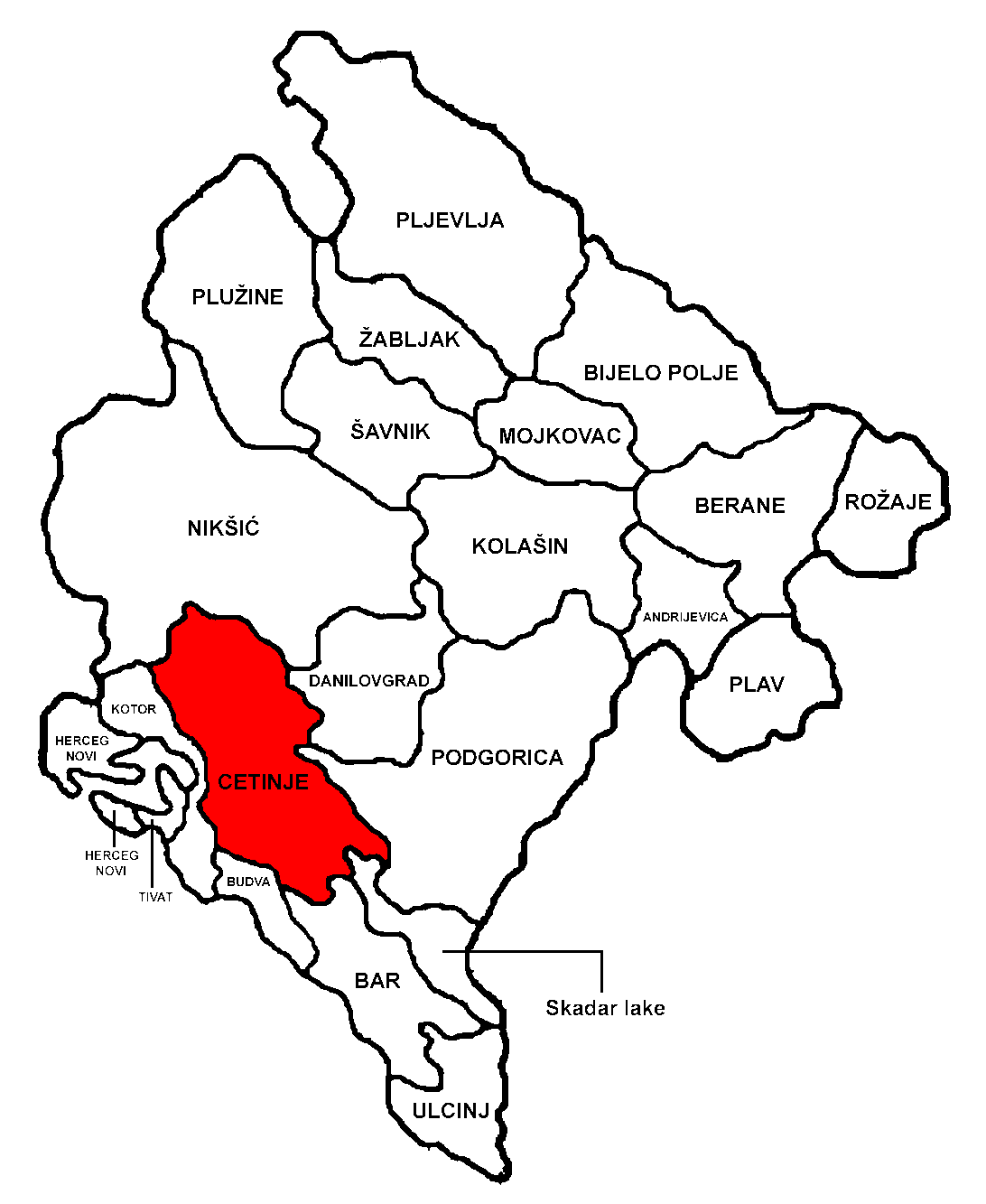
Cetinje municipality

- Bajice
- Barjamovica
- Bijele Poljane
- Bjeloši
- Bobija
- Boguti
- Bokovo
- Češljari
- Cetinje
- Čevo
- Đalci
- Dide
- Đinovići
- Dobrska Župa
- Dobrsko Selo
- Dodoši
- Donja Zaljut
- Donje Selo
- Dragomi Do
- Drušići
- Dubovik
- Dubovo
- Dugi Do
- Dujeva
- Erakovići
- Gađi
- Gornja Zaljut
- Gornji Ceklin
- Grab
- Građani
- Gradina
- Izvori
- Jankovići
- Jezer
- Kobilji Do
- Kopito
- Kosijeri
- Kranji Do
- Kućišta
- Lastva
- Lipa
- Lješev Stub
- Majstori
- Malošin Do
- Markovina
- Meterizi
- Mikulići
- Milijevići
- Mužovići
- Njeguši
- Obzovica
- Oćevići
- Očinići
- Ožegovice
- Pačarađe
- Pejovići
- Petrov Do
- Poda
- Podbukovica
- Prediš
- Prekornica
- Prentin Do
- Prevlaka
- Proseni Do
- Radomir
- Raičevići
- Resna
- Riječani
- Rijeka Crnojevića
- Rokoči
- Rvaši
- Ržani Do
- Šinđon
- Smokovci
- Štitari
- Tomići
- Trešnjevo
- Trnjine
- Uba
- Ubli
- Ublice
- Ugnji
- Ulići
- Velestovo
- Vignjevići
- Vojkovići
- Vrba
- Vrela
- Vučji Do
- Zabrđe
- Začir
- Zagora
- Žabljak Crnojevića
- Žanjev Do

== Danilovgrad ==
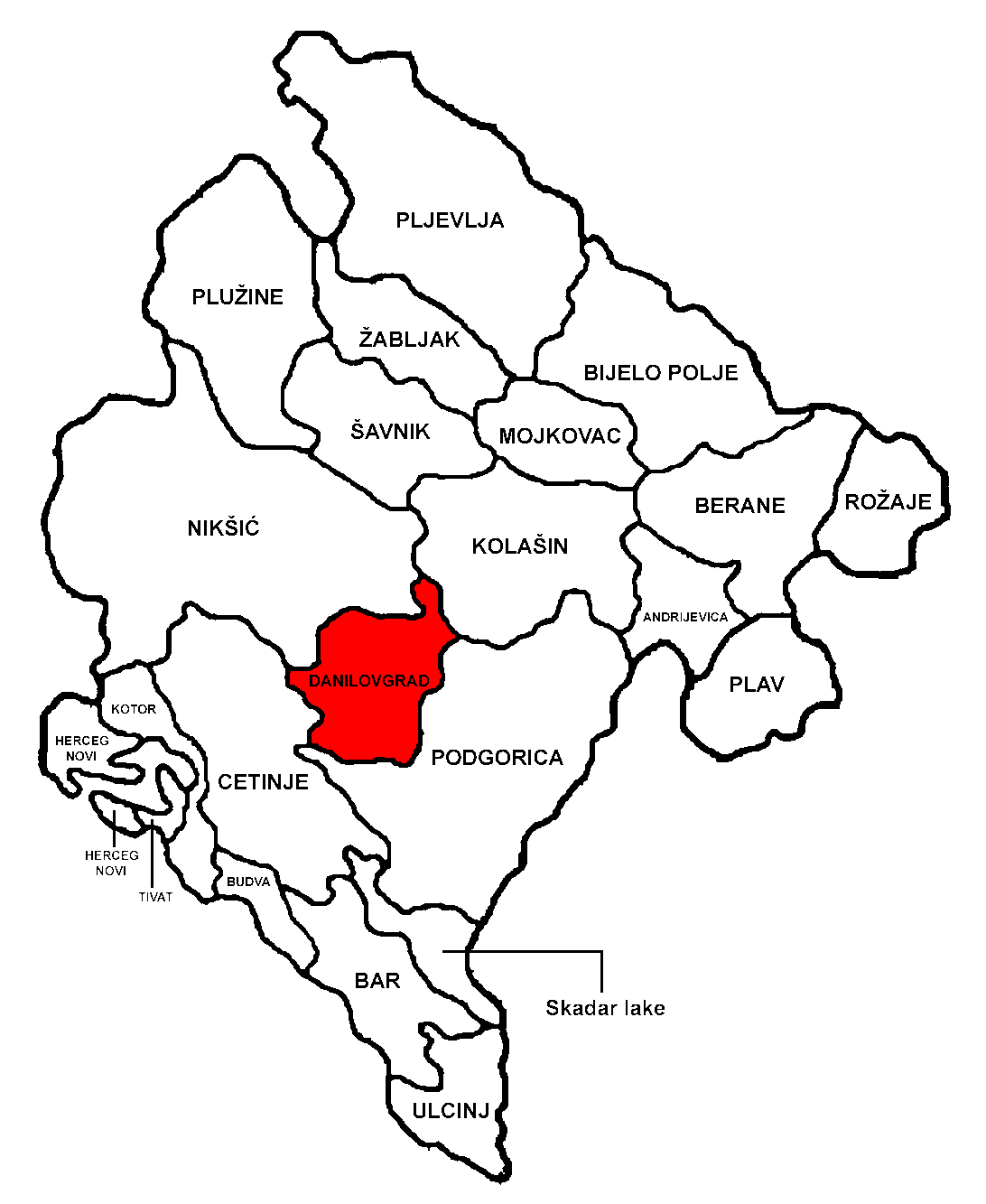
Danilovgrad municipality

- Bare Šumanovića
- Begovina
- Bileća
- Bobulja
- Bogićevići
- Boronjina
- Braćani
- Brajovići
- Brijestovo
- Ćurčići
- Ćurilac
- Dabojevići
- Daljam
- Danilovgrad
- Đeđezi
- Do Pješivački
- Dolovi
- Donje Selo
- Donji Martinići
- Donji Rsojevići
- Drakovići
- Đuričkovići
- Frutak
- Glizica
- Gorica
- Gornji Martinići
- Gornji Rsojevići
- Gostilje Brajovićko
- Gostilje Martinićko
- Gradina
- Grbe
- Grlić
- Gruda
- Jabuke
- Jastreb
- Jelenak
- Jovanovići
- Klikovače
- Kopito
- Kosić
- Kujava
- Kupinovo
- Lalevići
- Lazarev Krst
- Livade
- Lubovo
- Malenza
- Mandići
- Mijokusovići
- Miogost
- Mokanje
- Mosori
- Musterovići
- Novo Selo
- Orja Luka
- Pažići
- Pitome Loze
- Podglavica
- Podvraće
- Poljica
- Potkula
- Potočilo
- Povrhpoljina
- Požar
- Rošca
- Ržišta
- Sekulići
- Sladojevo Kopito
- Slap
- Slatina
- Šobaići
- Spuž
- Sretnja
- Strahinići
- Šume
- Tvorilo
- Veleta
- Vinići
- Viš
- Vučica
- Zagorak
- Zagreda
- Župa

== Gusinje ==
- Dolja / Dolla
- Dosuđe / Dosugja
- Grnčar / Gërnçar
- Gusinje / Gucia
- Kolenovići / Kolenaj
- Kruševo / Krusheva
- Martinovići / Martinaj
- Višnjevo / Vishnjeva
- Vusanje / Vuthaj

== Herceg Novi ==
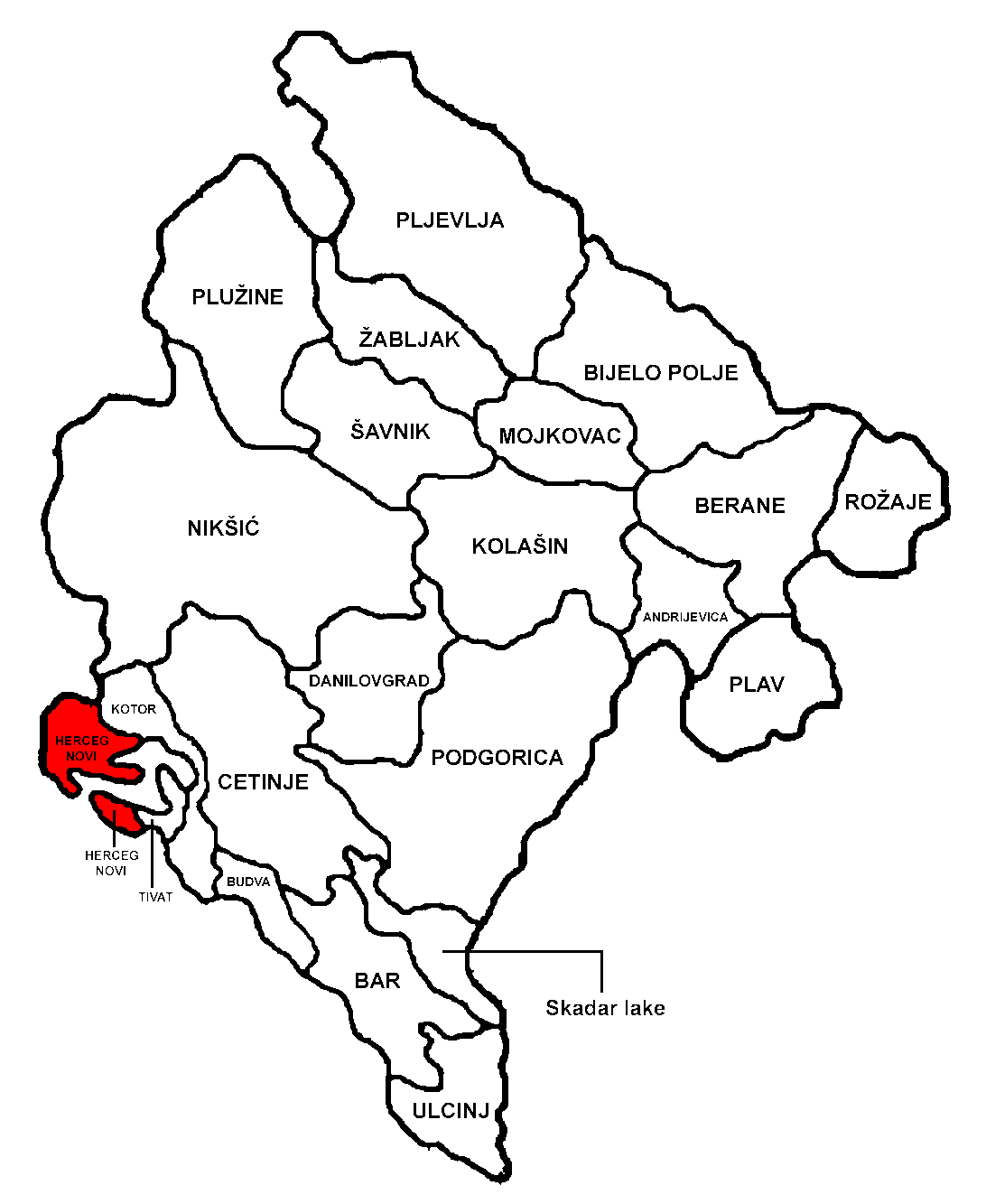
Herceg Novi municipality

- Baošići
- Bijela
- Bijelske Kruševice
- Đenovići
- Đurići
- Gomila
- Herceg Novi
- Igalo
- Jošice
- Kameno
- Kruševice
- Kumbor
- Kuti
- Luštica
- Meljine
- Mojdež
- Mokrine
- Podi
- Prijevor
- Provodina
- Ratiševina
- Savina
- Sasovići
- Sušćepan
- Sutorina
- Trebesinj
- Ubli
- Zelenika
- Žlijebi

== Kolašin ==
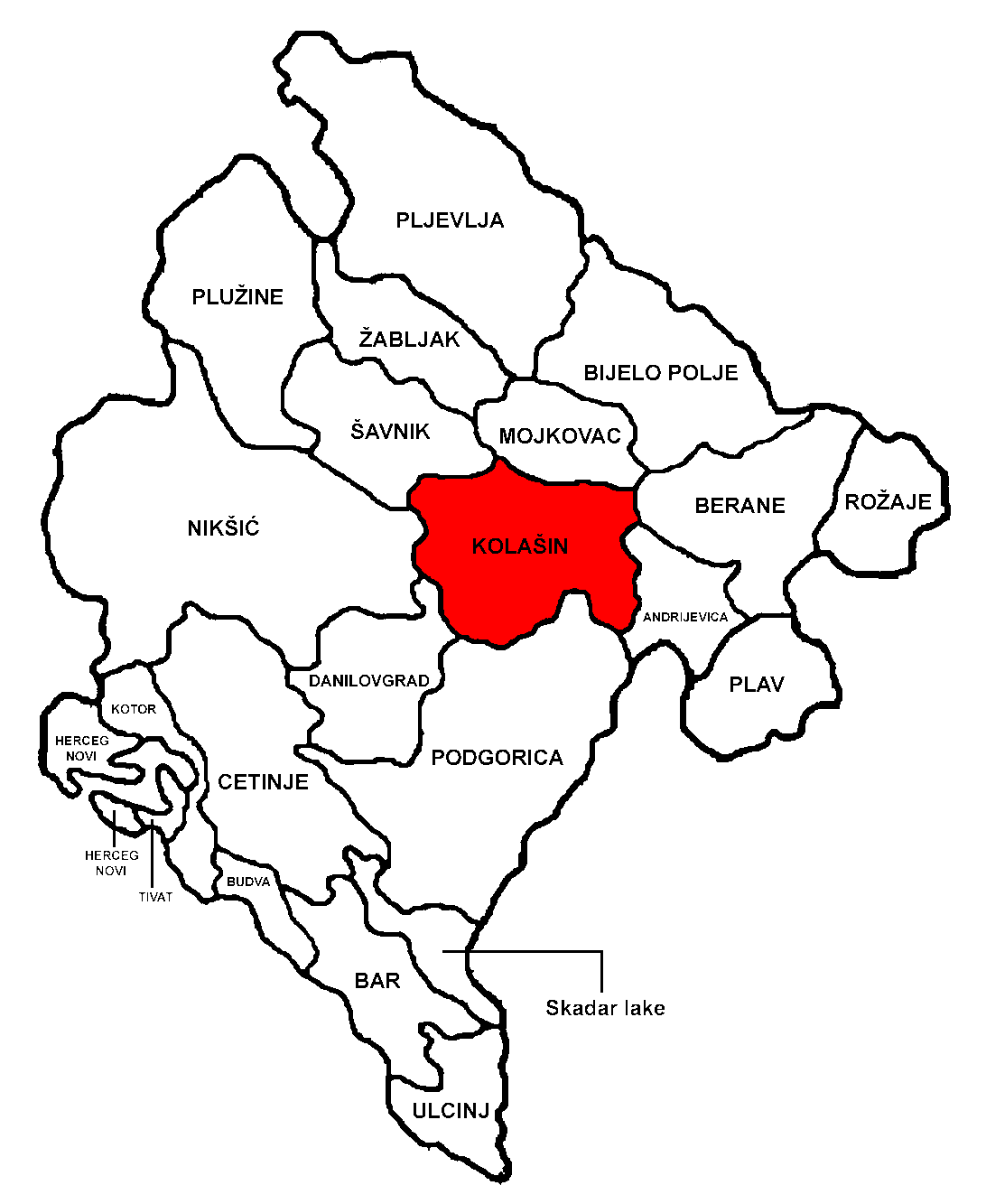
Kolašin municipality

- Babljak
- Bakovići
- Bare
- Bare Kraljske
- Blatina
- Bojići
- Breza
- Cerovice
- Crkvine
- Donje Lipovo
- Dragovića Polje
- Drijenak
- Drpe
- Đuđevina
- Dulovine
- Gornja Rovca Bulatovići
- Gornje Lipovo
- Izlasci
- Jabuka
- Jasenova
- Kolašin
- Kos
- Liješnje
- Lipovska Bistrica
- Ljevišta
- Ljuta
- Manastir Morača
- Mateševo
- Međuriječje
- Mioska
- Moračka Bistrica
- Moračko Trebaljevo
- Mrtvo Duboko
- Mujića Rečine
- Mušovića Rijeka
- Oćiba
- Ocka Gora
- Osretci
- Padež
- Pčinja
- Petrova Ravan
- Plana
- Požnja
- Radigojno
- Raičevina
- Raško
- Ravni
- Redice
- Rovačko Trebaljevo
- Sela
- Selišta
- Sjerogošte
- Skrbuša
- Smailagića Polje
- Smrče
- Sreteška Gora
- Starče
- Svrke
- Tara
- Trnovica
- Ulica
- Uvač
- Velje Duboko
- Višnje
- Vladoš
- Vlahovići
- Vojkovići
- Vranještica
- Vrujica
- Žirci

== Kotor ==
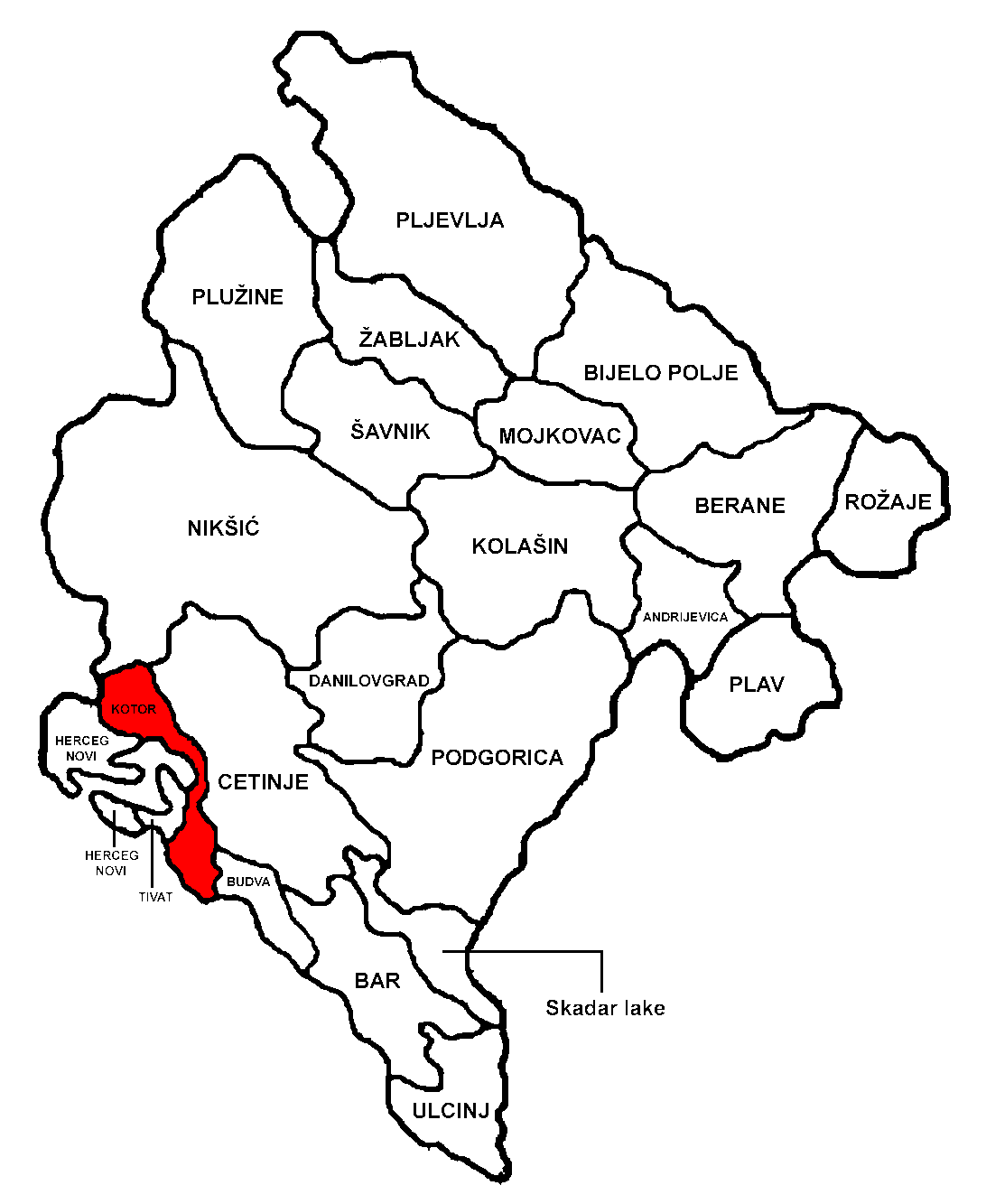
Kotor municipality

- Bigova
- Bratešići
- Bunovići
- Veliki Zalazi
- Višnjeva
- Vranovići
- Glavati
- Glavatičići
- Gornji Morinj
- Gornji Orahovac
- Gornji Stoliv
- Gorovići
- Dobrota
- Donji Morinj
- Donji Orahovac
- Donji Stoliv
- Dragalj
- Dražin Vrt
- Dub
- Zagora
- Zvečava
- Kavač
- Knežlaz
- Kovači
- Kolužunj
- Kostanjica
- Kotor
- Krimovica
- Kubasi
- Lastva Grbaljska
- Ledenice
- Lipci
- Lješevići
- Mali Zalazi
- Malov Do
- Mirac
- Muo
- Nalježići
- Pelinovo
- Perast
- Pištet
- Pobrđe
- Prijeradi
- Prčanj
- Radanovići
- Risan
- Strp
- Sutvara
- Trešnjica
- Ukropci
- Unijerina
- Han
- Čavori
- Šišići
- Škaljari
- Špiljari

== Mojkovac ==
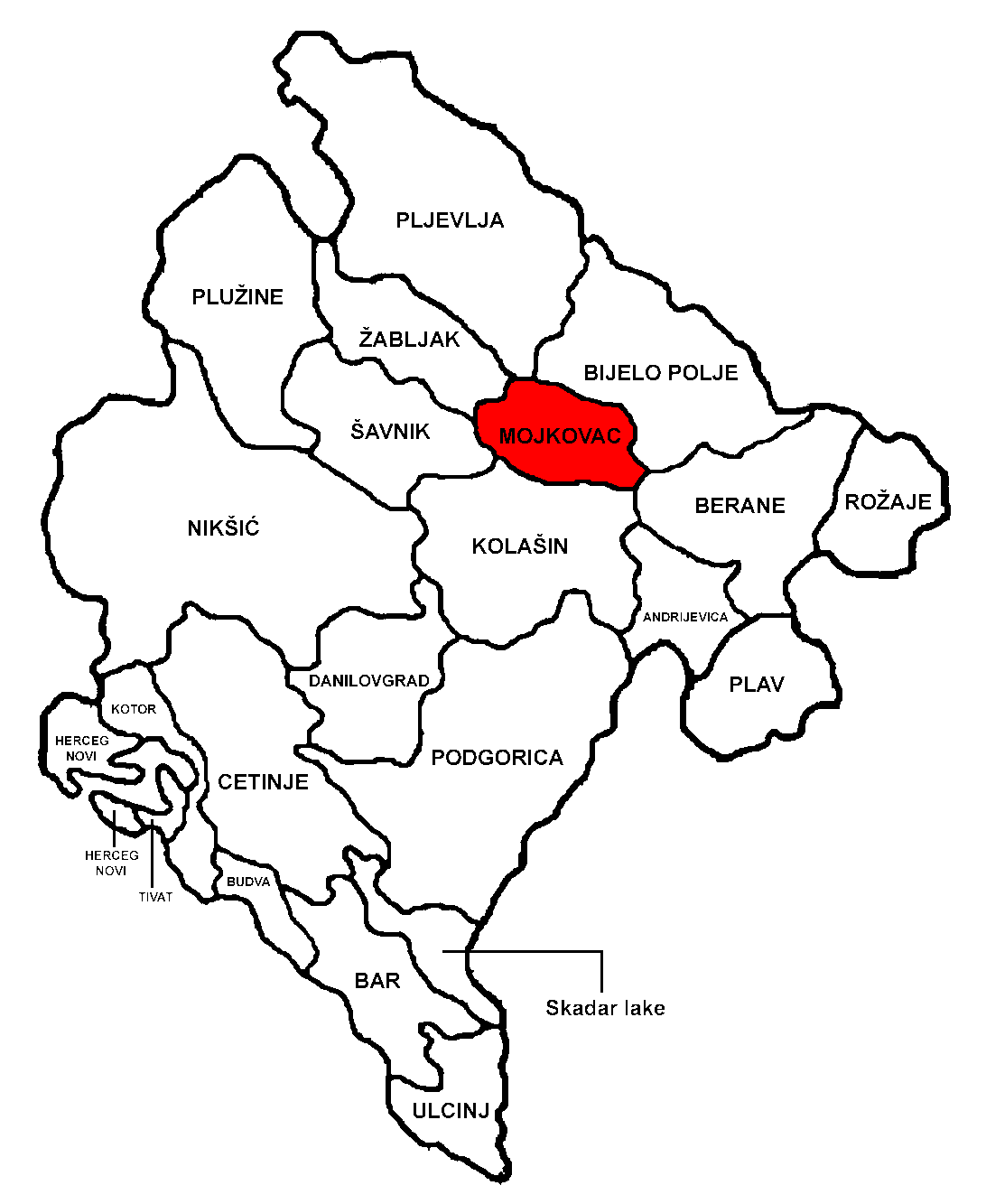
Mojkovac municipality

- Bistrica
- Bjelojevići
- Bojna Njiva
- Brskovo
- Dobrilovina
- Gojakovići
- Lepenac
- Mojkovac
- Podbišće
- Polja
- Prošćenje
- Stevanovac
- Štitarica
- Uroševina
- Žari

== Nikšić ==
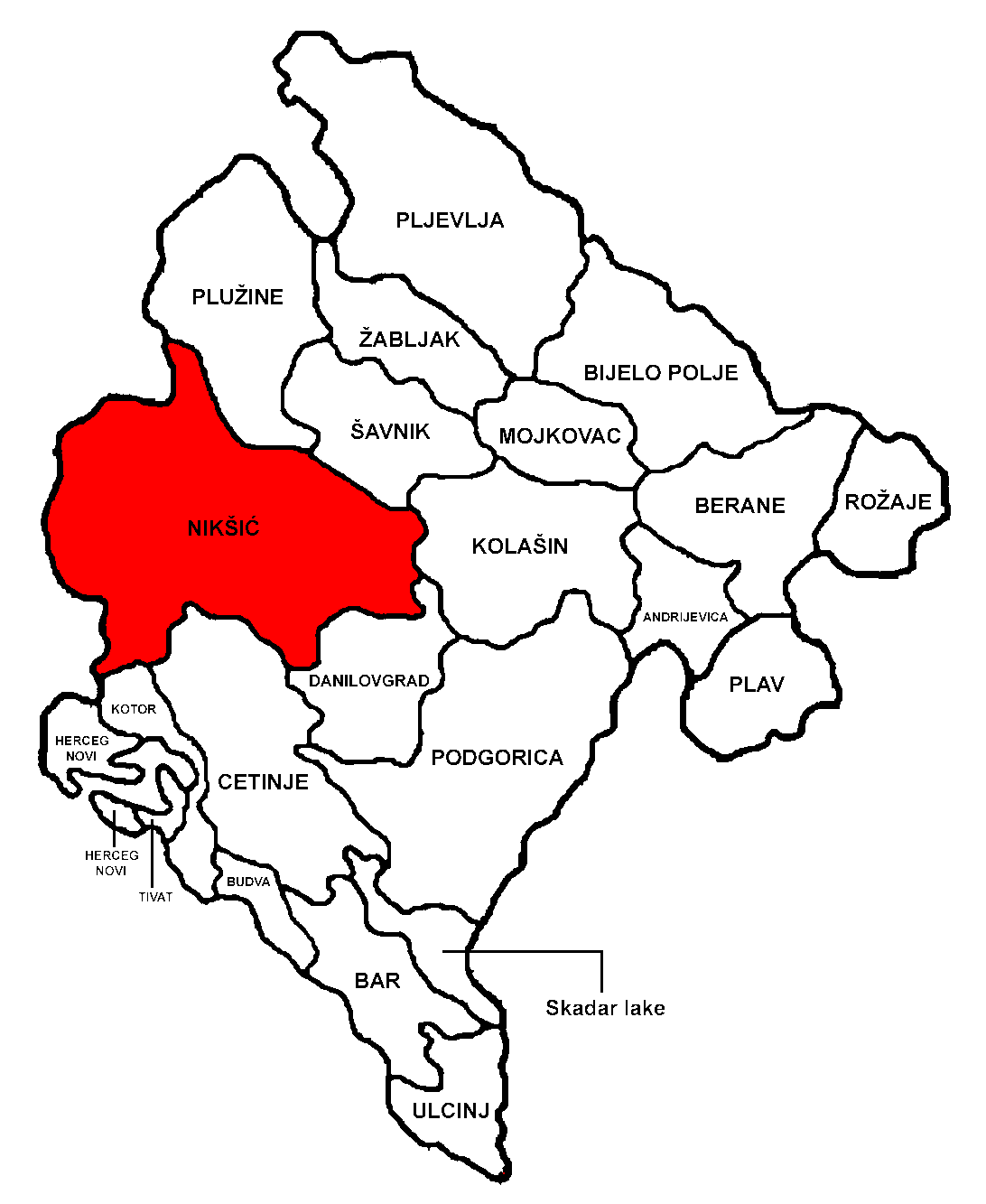
Nikšić municipality

- Balosave
- Bare
- Bastaji
- Bjeloševina
- Bobotovo Groblje
- Bogetići
- Bogmilovići
- Brestice
- Brezovik
- Broćanac Nikšićki
- Broćanac Viluški
- Bršno
- Bubrežak
- Busak
- Carine
- Cerovo
- Crnodoli
- Dolovi
- Donja Trepča
- Donje Čarađe
- Donje Crkvice
- Dragovoljići
- Drenoštica
- Dubočke
- Dučice
- Duga
- Gornja Trepča
- Gornje Čarađe
- Gornje Crkvice
- Gornje Polje
- Goslić
- Gradačka Poljana
- Grahovac
- Grahovo
- Granice
- Gvozd
- Ivanje
- Jabuke
- Jasenovo Polje
- Javljen
- Jugovići
- Kamensko
- Kazanci
- Klenak
- Koprivice
- Koravlica
- Kovači
- Kunak
- Kuside
- Kuta
- Laz
- Liverovići
- Lukovo
- Macavare
- Međeđe
- Miljanići
- Miločani
- Milojevići
- Miruše
- Mokri Do
- Morakovo
- Nikšić
- Nudo
- Oblatno
- Orah
- Orlina
- Ozrinići
- Petrovići
- Pilatovci
- Počekovići
- Podbožur
- Podvrš
- Ponikvica
- Povija
- Praga
- Prigradina
- Prisoje
- Rastovac
- Riđani
- Riječani
- Rudine
- Šipačno
- Sjenokosi
- Smrduša
- Somina
- Spila
- Srijede
- Staro Selo
- Štedim
- Štitari
- Stuba
- Stubica
- Tupan
- Ubli
- Vasiljevići
- Velimlje
- Vidne
- Vilusi
- Vir
- Višnjića Do
- Vitasojevići
- Vraćenovići
- Vrbica
- Vučji Do
- Zagora
- Zagrad
- Zaljutnica
- Zaslap
- Zavrh
- Zlostup

== Petnjica ==
- Azane
- Bor
- Dašča Rijeka
- Dobrodole
- Donja Vrbica
- Godočelje
- Gornja Vrbica
- Javorova
- Johovica
- Kalica
- Kruščica
- Lagatori
- Lješnica
- Murovac
- Orahovo
- Pahulj
- Petnjica
- Ponor
- Poroče
- Radmanci
- Savin Bor
- Trpezi
- Tucanje
- Vrševo

== Plav ==
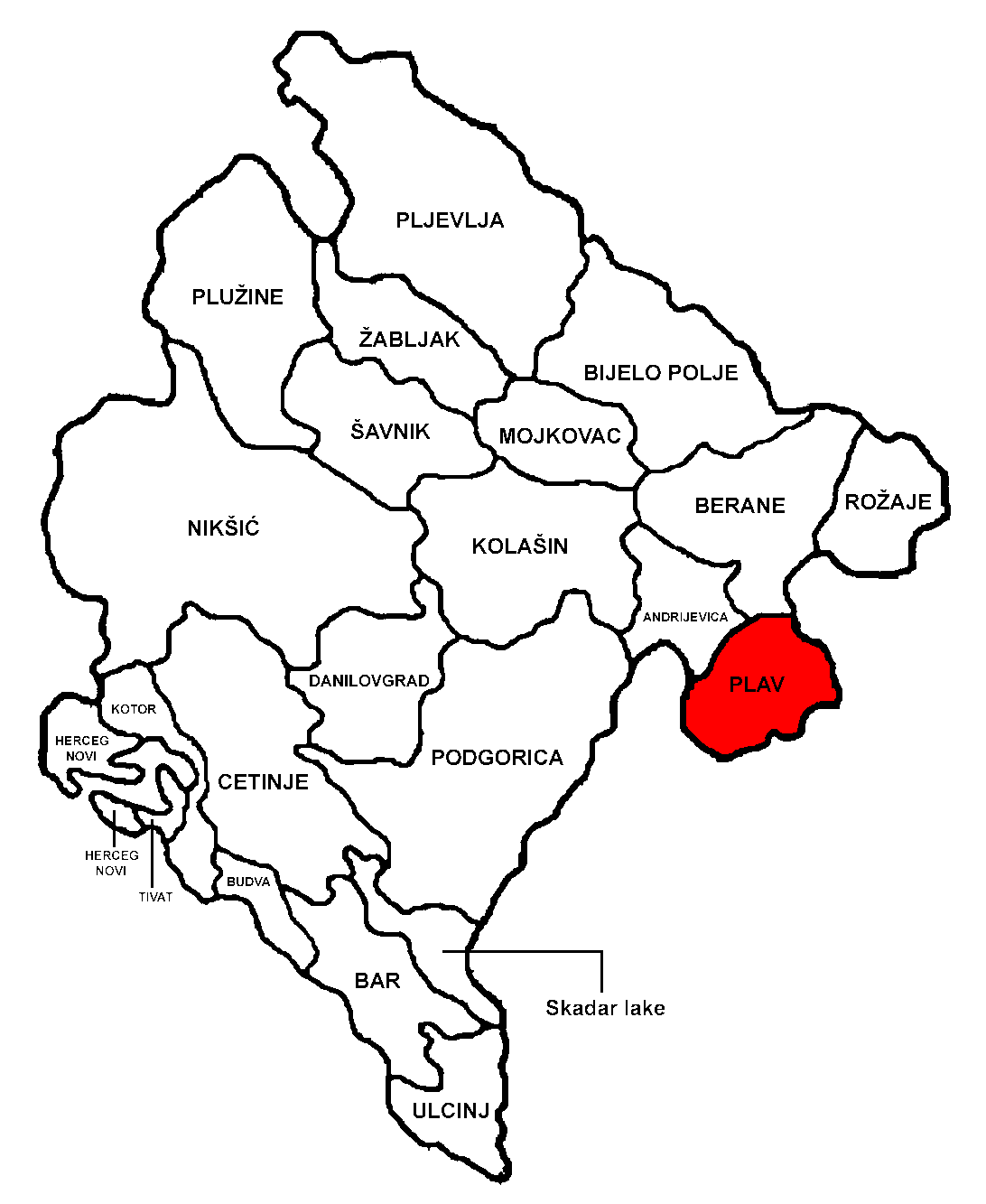
Plav municipality

- Bogajići / Bogaj
- Brezojevica / Brezovica
- Đurička Rijeka / Reka e Xhurës
- Gornja Rženica / Rëzhnica e Epërme
- Hoti / Hoti
- Mašnica / Mashnica
- Meteh
- Murino / Murina
- Novšići / Nokshiq
- Plav / Pllava
- Prnjavor / Prnjavori
- Skić
- Velika
- Vojno Selo

== Plužine ==
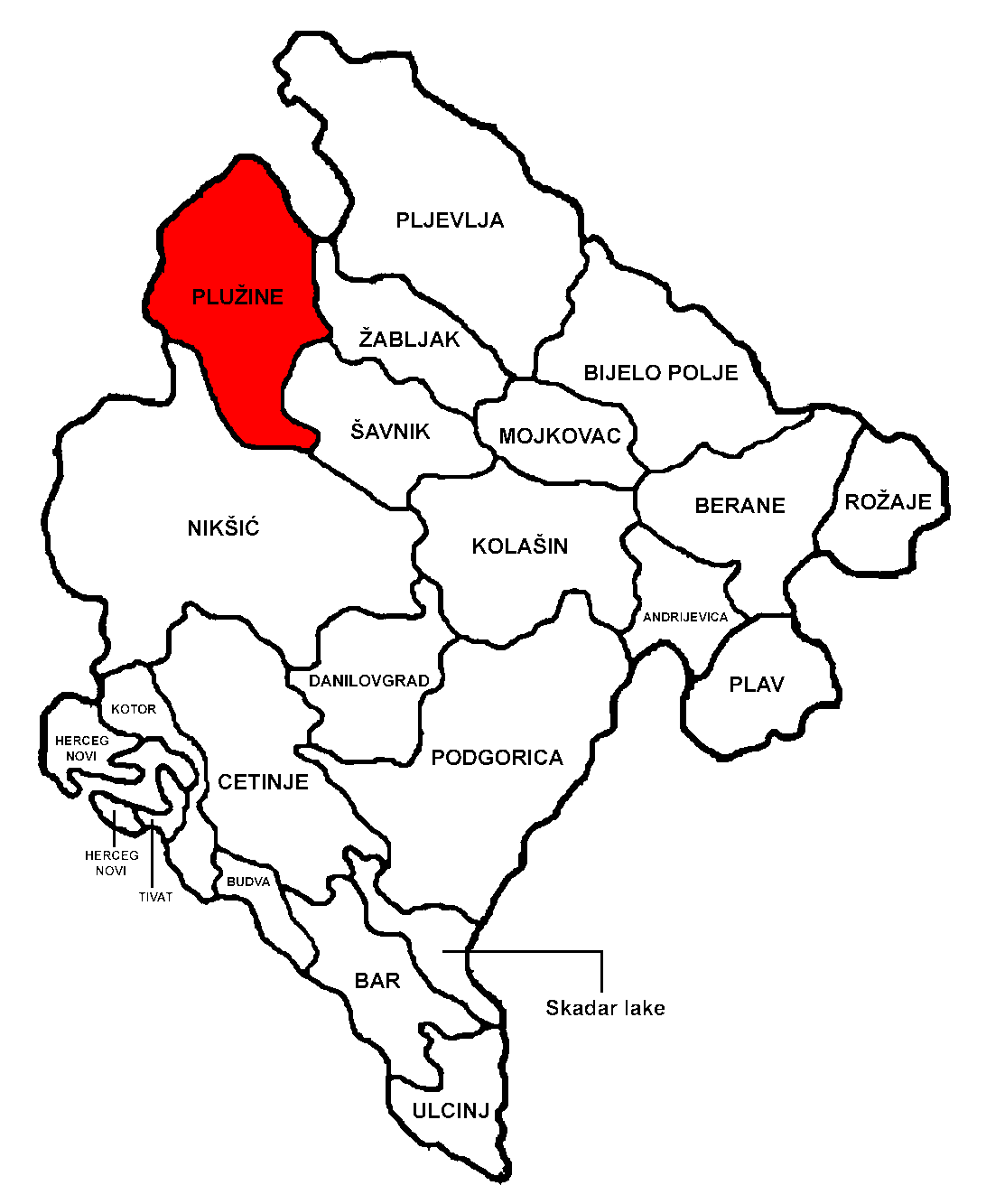
Plužine municipality

- Babići
- Bajovo Polje
- Barni Do
- Bezuje
- Bojati
- Boričje
- Borkovići
- Brijeg
- Brljevo
- Bukovac
- Crkvičko Polje
- Donja Brezna
- Dubljevići
- Goransko
- Gornja Brezna
- Jerinići
- Kneževići
- Kovači
- Lisina
- Miljkovac
- Miloševići
- Mratinje
- Nedajno
- Nikovići
- Osojni Orah
- Pišče
- Plužine
- Poljana
- Prisojni Orah
- Ravno
- Rudinice
- Šarići
- Seljani
- Smriječno
- Stabna
- Stolac
- Stubica
- Trsa
- Unač
- Vojinovići
- Zabrđe
- Žeično
- Zukva

== Pljevlja ==
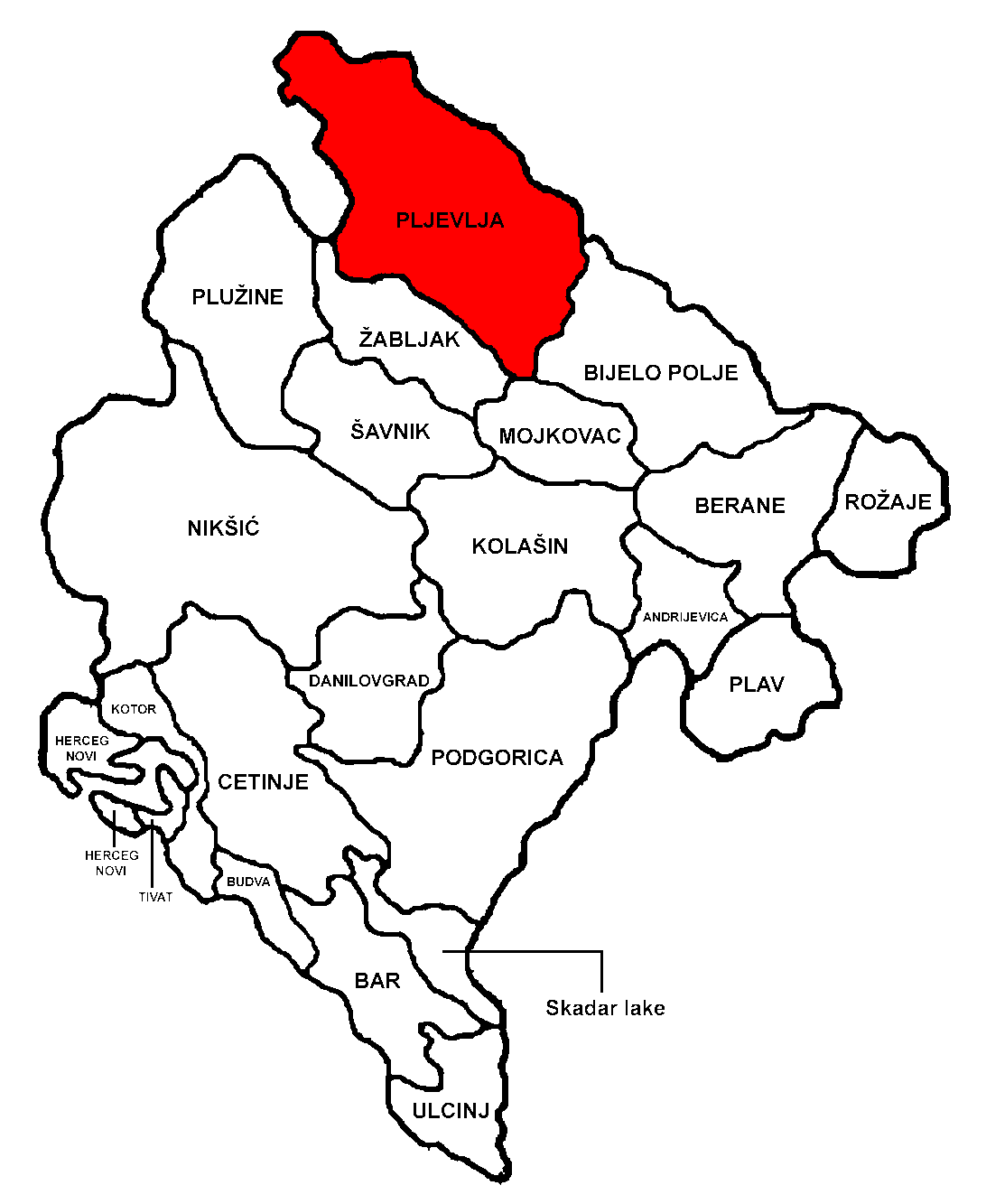
Pljevlja municipality

- Alići
- Beljkovići
- Bjeloševina
- Bobovo
- Boljanići
- Borišići
- Borova
- Borovica
- Boščinovići
- Brda
- Bujaci
- Burići
- Bušnje
- Čardak
- Čavanj
- Čerjenci
- Cerovci
- Čestin
- Crljenice
- Crni Vrh
- Crno Brdo
- Crnobori
- Donja Brvenica
- Dragaši
- Dubac
- Dubočica
- Dubrava
- Đuli
- Đurđevića Tara
- Durutovići
- Dužice
- Geuši
- Glibaći
- Glisnica
- Gornja Brvenica
- Gornje Selo
- Gotovuša
- Gradac
- Gradina
- Grevo
- Hoćevina
- Horevina
- Jabuka
- Jagodni Do
- Jahovići
- Jasen
- Jugovo
- Kakmuži
- Kalušići
- Katun
- Klakorina
- Kolijevka
- Komine
- Kordovina
- Kosanica
- Košare
- Kotlajići
- Kotline
- Kotorac
- Kovačevići
- Kovači
- Kozica
- Krće
- Krupice
- Kruševo
- Kržava
- Kukavica
- Lađana
- Leovo Brdo
- Lever Tara
- Lijeska
- Ljuće
- Ljutići
- Lugovi
- Madžari
- Male Krće
- Maoče
- Mataruge
- Meljak
- Metaljka
- Mijakovići
- Milakovići
- Milunići
- Mironići
- Moćevići
- Moraice
- Mrčevo
- Mrčići
- Mrzovići
- Nange
- Obarde
- Odžak
- Ograđenica
- Orlja
- Otilovići
- Paljevine
- Pauče
- Petine
- Pižure
- Plakala
- Planjsko
- Pliješ
- Pliješevina
- Pljevlja
- Poblaće
- Podborova
- Popov Do
- Potkovač
- Potkrajci
- Potoci
- Potpeće
- Potrlica
- Pračica
- Prehari
- Premćani
- Prisoji
- Prošće
- Pušanjski Do
- Rabitlje
- Rađevići
- Romac
- Rudnica
- Rujevica
- Selac
- Selišta
- Sirčići
- Slatina
- Šljivansko
- Šljuke
- Srećanje
- Stančani
- Strahov Do
- Stranice
- Šula
- Šumani
- Tatarovina
- Trnovice
- Tvrdakovići
- Uremovići
- Varine
- Vaškovo
- Velike Krće
- Vidre
- Vijenac
- Vilići
- Višnjica
- Vodno
- Vojtina
- Vrba
- Vrbica
- Vrulja
- Vukšići
- Zabrđe
- Zaselje
- Zbljevo
- Zekavice
- Zenica
- Zorlovići
- Židovići

== Podgorica ==
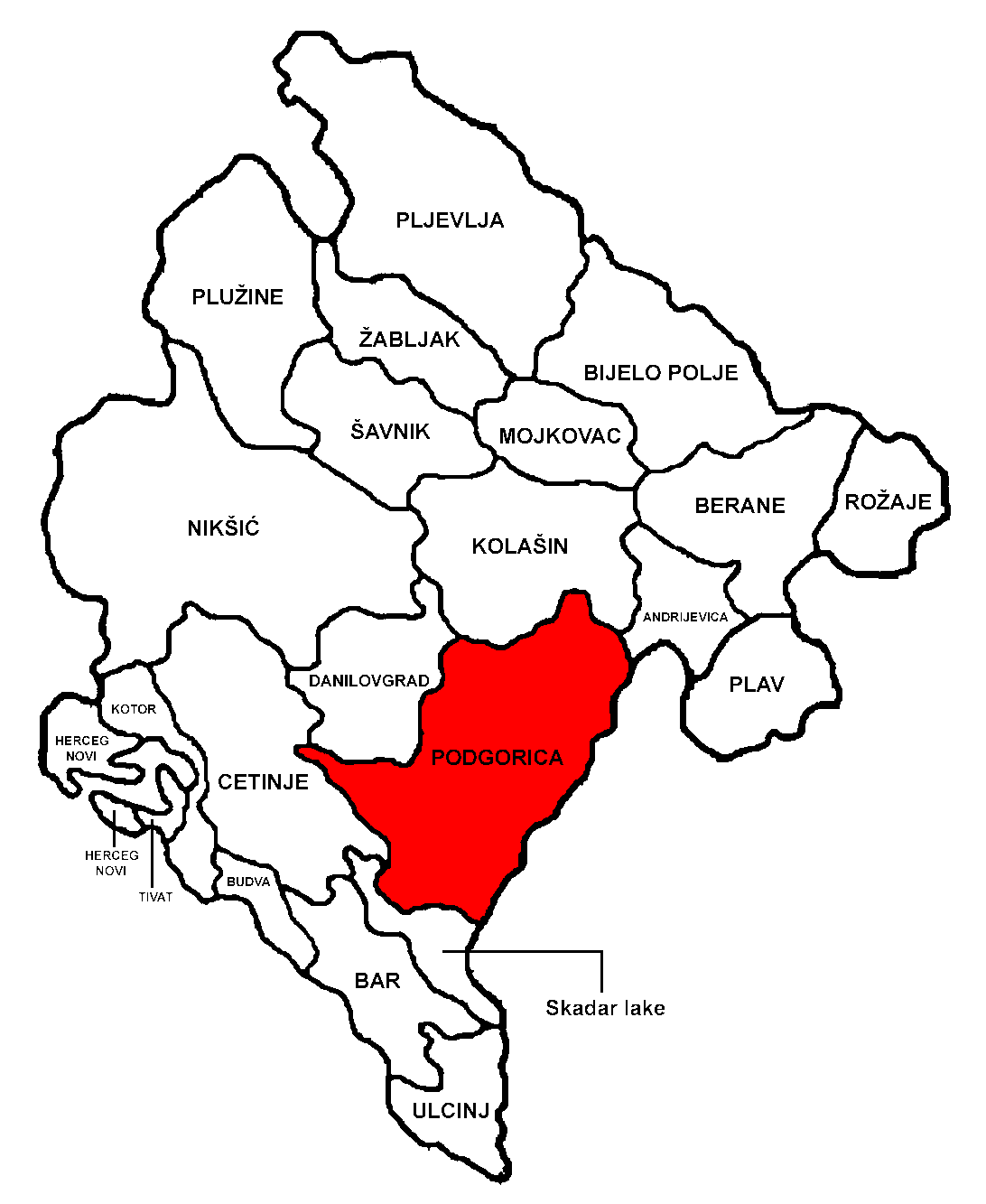
Podgorica municipality

- Baloči
- Begova Glavica
- Beri
- Berislavci
- Bezjovo
- Bigor
- Bioče
- Bistrice
- Blizna
- Bolesestra
- Brežine
- Briđe
- Brskut
- Buronji
- Crnci
- Crvena Paprat
- Cvilin
- Ćafa
- Ćepetići
- Dolovi
- Donje Stravče
- Donji Kokoti / Kokoti i Poshtëm
- Draževina
- Dučići
- Duga
- Đurkovići
- Duške
- Farmaci
- Fundina / Fundëna
- Goljemadi / Gojëmadhi
- Gornje Stravče
- Gornji Kokoti / Kokoti i Epërm
- Gostilj
- Gradac
- Grbavci
- Grbi Do
- Kiselica
- Klopot
- Kopilje
- Korita / Koritë
- Kornet
- Kosor
- Kruse
- Kržanja
- Kurilo
- Lekići / Lekaj
- Liješnje
- Liješta
- Lijeva Rijeka
- Ljajkovići
- Lopate
- Lutovo
- Lužnica
- Mataguži / Mataguzhi
- Medun / Meduni
- Mileti
- Mitrovići
- Momče
- Mrke
- Opasanica
- Orahovo
- Oraovice
- Orasi
- Ožezi
- Parci
- Pelev Brijeg
- Petrovići
- Podgorica
- Ponari
- Prisoja
- Progonovići
- Raći
- Radeća
- Radovče
- Releza
- Rijeka Piperska
- Seoca
- Seoštica
- Sjenice / Sjenica
- Slacko
- Srpska
- Staniselići
- Stanjevića Rupa
- Stijena
- Stupovi
- Šušunja
- Trmanje
- Tuzi Ljevorečke
- Ubalac
- Ubli
- Velje Brdo
- Veruša
- Vidijenje
- Vilac
- Vranjina
- Vrbica
- Zagreda
- Zaugao

== Rožaje ==
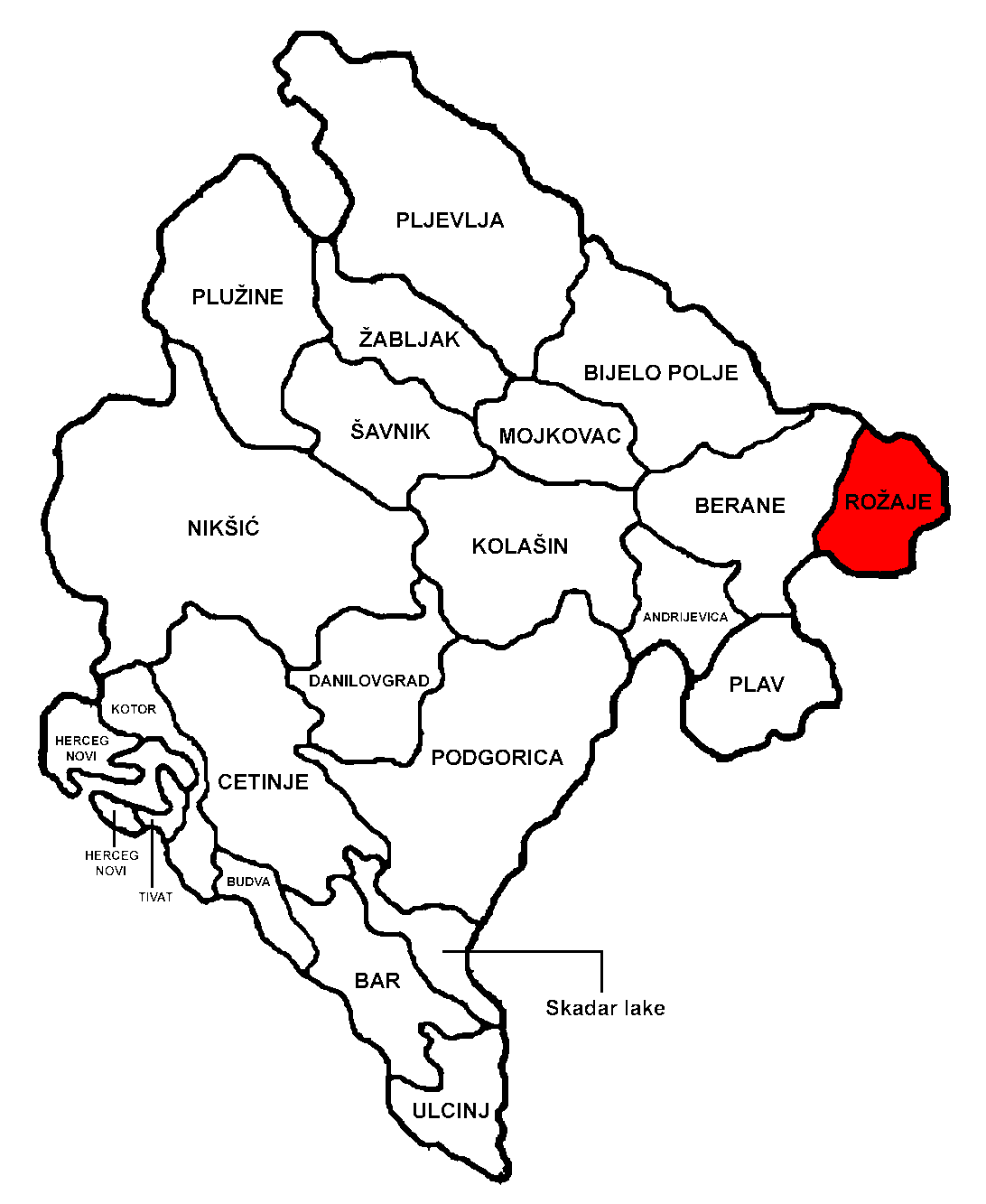
Rožaje municipality

- Bać / Baçi
- Balotići / Balotiqi
- Bandžov / Banxhovi
- Bašča / Bashqa
- Besnik / Besniku
- Bijela Crkva / Bellacërka
- Biševo / Bisheva
- Bogaji
- Bukovica
- Crnokrpe / Cërnokërpi
- Dacići / Dacaj
- Donja Lovnica / Lovnice e Poshtëme
- Gornja Lovnica / Lovnica e Epërme
- Grahovo / Grahova
- Grižice / Grizhica
- Ibarac / Ibërci
- Jablanica / Jablani
- Kalače / Kalaçi
- Koljeno / Kolena
- Paučina / Pauçina
- Plumci / Pëllumbësi
- Radetina
- Rožaje / Rozhaja
- Seošnica / Seoshnica
- Sinanovići / Sinanoviqi
- Vuča / Vuçi

== Šavnik ==
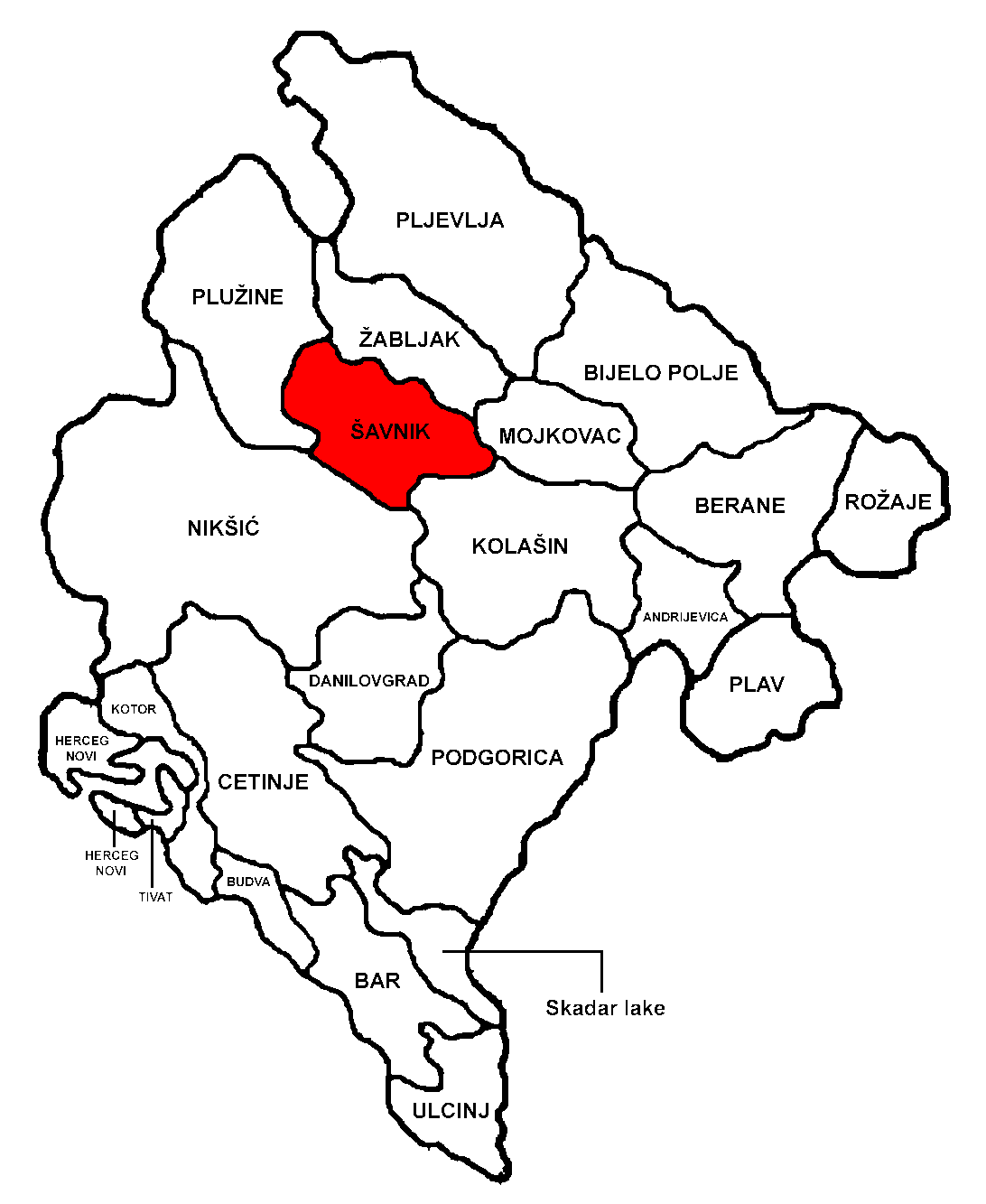
Šavnik municipality

- Bare
- Boan
- Dobra Sela
- Donja Bijela
- Donja Bukovica
- Dubrovsko
- Duži
- Godijelji
- Gornja Bijela
- Gornja Bukovica
- Grabovica
- Komarnica
- Krnja Jela
- Malinsko
- Miloševići
- Mljetičak
- Mokro
- Petnjica
- Pošćenje
- Previš
- Pridvorica
- Provalija
- Šavnik
- Slatina
- Strug
- Timar
- Tušina

== Tivat ==
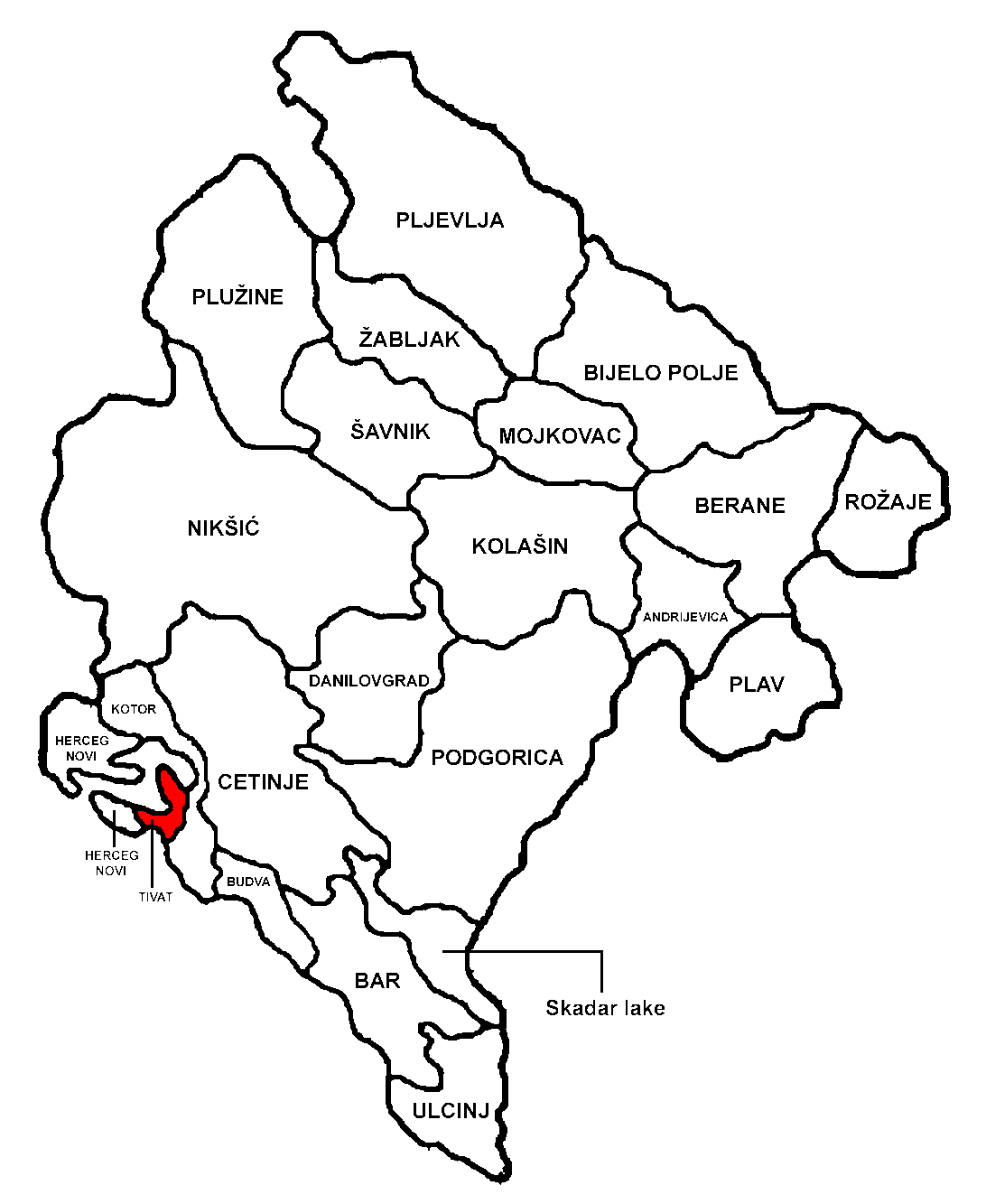
Tivat municipality

- Bogdašići
- Bogišići
- Donja Lastva
- Đuraševići
- Gornja Lastva
- Gošići
- Krašići
- Lepetani
- Milovići
- Mrčevac
- Radovići
- Tivat

== Tuzi ==
- Arza / Arrëza
- Barlaj
- Benkaj
- Budza / Budëza
- Cijevna / Cemi
- Delaj
- Dinoša / Dinosha
- Donji Milješ / Mileshi i Poshtëm
- Drešaj / Dreshaj
- Drume / Druma
- Dušići / Dushi
- Gornji Milješ / Mileshi i Epërm
- Gurec / Gurreci
- Helmnica / Helmnica
- Koći / Kojë
- Kotrabudan / Kodërbudani
- Krševo / Kësheva
- Lovka / Llofka
- Mužeška / Muzheçku
- Nabon / Nabomi
- Nikmaraš / Nikmarashi
- Omerbožovići / Ymerbozhaj or Bozhaj
- Pikalj / Pikal
- Podhum / Nënhelmi
- Poprat / Poprati
- Prifti / Prifti
- Rakića Kuće / Shtëpia e Rakiqëve
- Rudine / Rudina
- Selište / Selishti
- Skorać / Skoraqi
- Spinja / Spi
- Stjepovo / Stjepohi
- Sukuruć / Sukuruqi
- Traboin / Traboini
- Tuzi / Tuz
- Vladni / Vllana
- Vranj / Vranji
- Vuksanlekići / Vuksanlekaj

== Ulcinj ==
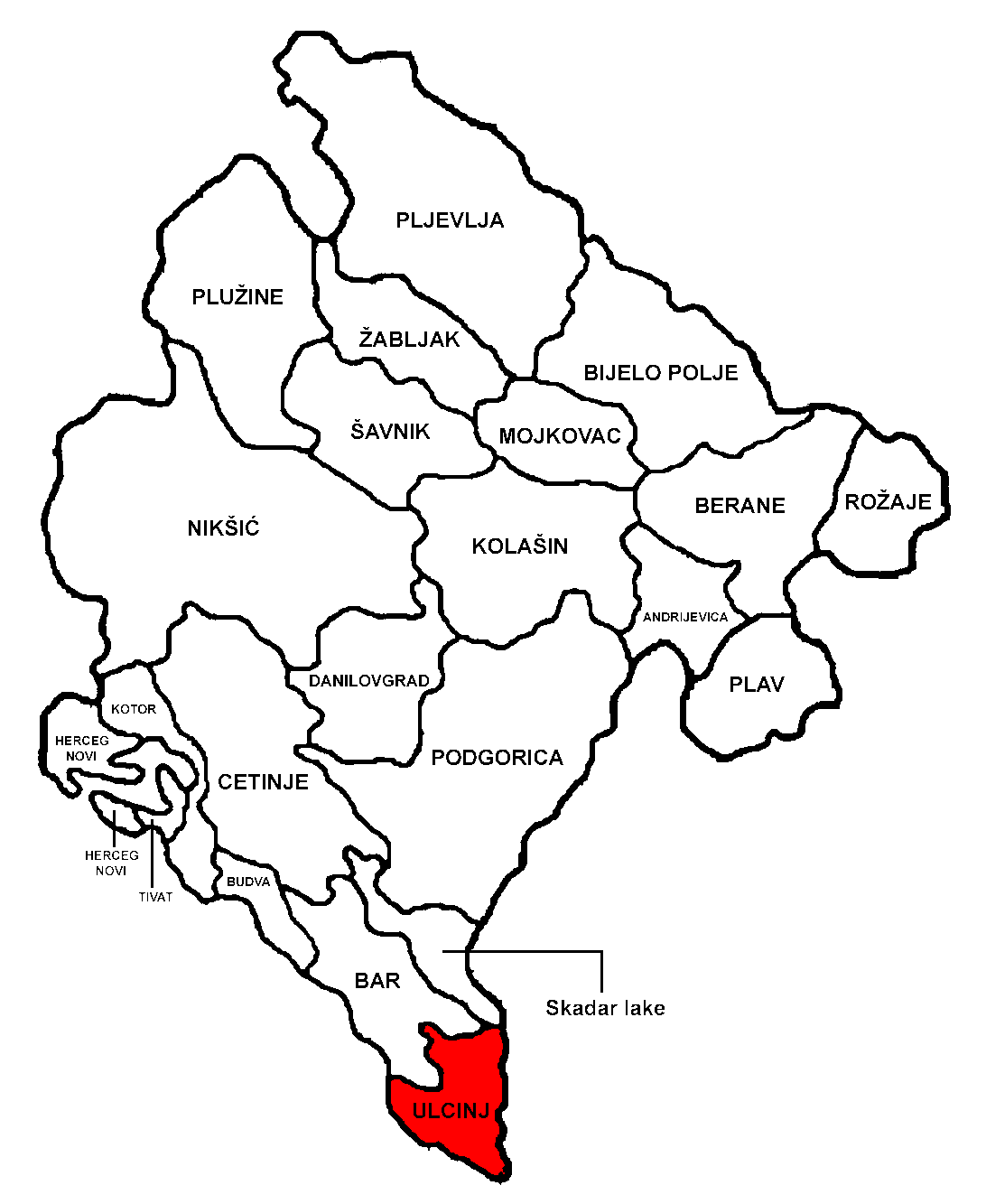
Ulcinj municipality

- Ambula / Amull
- Bijela Gora / Mal i Bardhë
- Bojke / Bojkë
- Brajše / Brajshë
- Bratica / Braticë
- Briska Gora / Mali i Brisë
- Ćurke / Qurkaj
- Darza / Darzë
- Donja Klezna / Klezna e Poshtme
- Donji Štoj / Shtoj i Poshtëm
- Draginje / Dragaj
- Fraskanjel / Fraskanjell
- Gornja Klezna / Klezna e Epërme
- Gornji Štoj / Shtoj i Epërm
- Kaliman / Kalimani
- Kodre / Kodër
- Kolonza
- Kosići / Kosiq
- Kravari / Kravari
- Kruče / Kruça
- Kruta / Krutë
- Krute / Krythë
- Leskovac
- Lisna Bore
- Međureč / Megjureç
- Mide / Millë
- Možura / Mozhurë
- Pistula / Pistull
- Rastiš / Rastish
- Reč / Reç
- Salč / Salç
- Sukobin / Sukobinë
- Sutjel / Sutjell
- Sveti Đorđe / Shëngjergj
- Šas / Shas
- Štodra / Shtodhër
- Ulcinj / Ulqini
- Vladimir / Katërkollë
- Zoganj / Zogaj

== Zeta ==
- Balabani
- Berislavci
- Bijelo Polje
- Bistrice
- Botun
- Donja Cijevna
- Golubovci
- Goričani
- Gostilj
- Kurilo
- Ljajkovići
- Mahala
- Mataguži
- Mitrovići
- Mojanovići
- Ponari
- Srpska
- Šušunja
- Vranjina
- Vukovci

== Žabljak ==
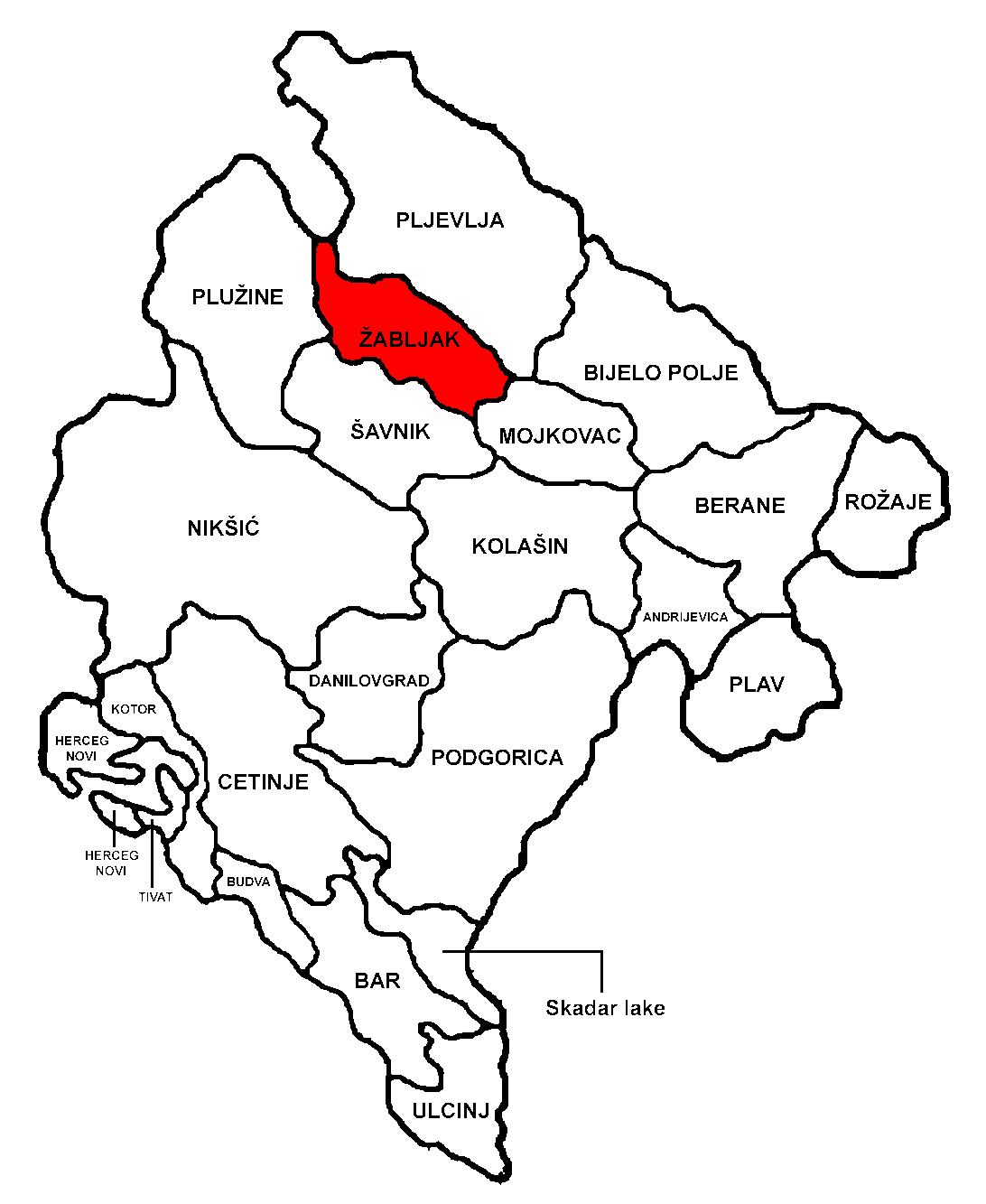
Žabljak municipality

- Borje
- Brajkovača
- Dobri Nugo
- Gomile
- Gradina
- Krš
- Mala Crna Gora
- Motički Gaj
- Ninkovići
- Njegovuđa
- Novakovići
- Palež
- Pašina Voda
- Pašino Polje
- Pitomine
- Podgora
- Pošćenski Kraj
- Rasova
- Rudanci
- Suvodo
- Šljivansko
- Šumanovac
- Tepačko Polje
- Tepca
- Virak
- Vrela
- Zminica
- Žabljak

== See also ==
- Subdivisions of Montenegro
- Municipalities of Montenegro
- List of regions of Montenegro
- List of cities in Montenegro
