= Pridvorica =

Pridvorica may refer to:

== Bosnia and Herzegovina ==
- Pridvorica, Gacko, a village in Republika Srpska

== Montenegro ==
- Pridvorica, Šavnik, a village
- Pridvorica (river), a tributary of the Komarnica

== Serbia ==
- Pridvorica (Blace), a village
- Pridvorica (Bojnik), a village
- Pridvorica (Čačak), a village
- Pridvorica (Kraljevo), a village
- Pridvorica (Lajkovac), a village
- Pridvorica Monastery, in Ivanjica

== See also ==
- Pridvorice, a village in Smederevska Palanka, Serbia
