= Vinicka =

Vinicka may refer to:

- Vinicka, Berane Municipality, Montenegro
- Vinicka (Prijepolje), Serbia
