= Trešnjevo =

Trešnjevo may refer to:

- Trešnjevo, Andrijevica, a village in Montenegro
- Trešnjevo, Cetinje, a village in the municipality of Cetinje, Montenegro
