= Milija and Pavle Bakić =

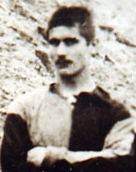
Milija Bakić in Galatasaray.

Milija Bakić (Turkish: Milo Bakiç) and Pavle Bakić (Turkish: Pol Bakiç) were two Serbian brothers from Andrijevica, in the Principality of Montenegro, who were students at the Galatasaray High School and co-founded the Galatasaray football club on October 30, 1905, with 11 fellow students. Born in the village of Zabrđe, to a family from the Vasojevici tribe, near Andrijevica, the brothers studied in Constantinople, living with their uncle Mitar Bakić who was a consul in the Ottoman Empire. The brothers also finished military school, with the rank of officer, although at the beginning of the Balkan Wars, they returned to their country, then the Kingdom of Montenegro, and served in Janko Vukotić's Third Serbian Volunteer Unit, in Cetinje. They fought in Macedonia, where Milija was killed in a battle near Kočani. Some still view him as the best Turkish footballer in history. A monument was erected in their home village, gifted by Galatasaray staff, on June 16, 2014.

Memorium for Milije (Mile) Bakić. Soldier of the Third Volunteers Guard of the Serbian Army.
