= Đulići =

Đulići may refer to:

- Đulići (Zvornik), Bosnia and Herzegovina
- Đulići, Montenegro
- Đulići, a poetry collection by Jovan Jovanović Zmaj
