= Paučina =

Paučina Паучина
- Village
- Location within Montenegro
- Country: Montenegro
- Municipality: Rožaje

Population (2011)
  - Total: 236
- Time zone: UTC+1 (CET)
  - Summer (DST): UTC+2 (CEST)

Paučina (Serbian Cyrillic: Паучина) is a village in the municipality of Rožaje, Montenegro.

== Demographics ==
Many people in the older generations of Paučina (Albanian: Pauçina) were Albanian-speakers. Many families from the village and its hamlets have historically migrated to the villages of Deçan's Lumbardh (east of Rožaje). According to the 2011 census, its population was 236, with all but 5 of them Bosniaks.
