= Gnjili Potok =

Gnjili Potok Гњили поток
- Village
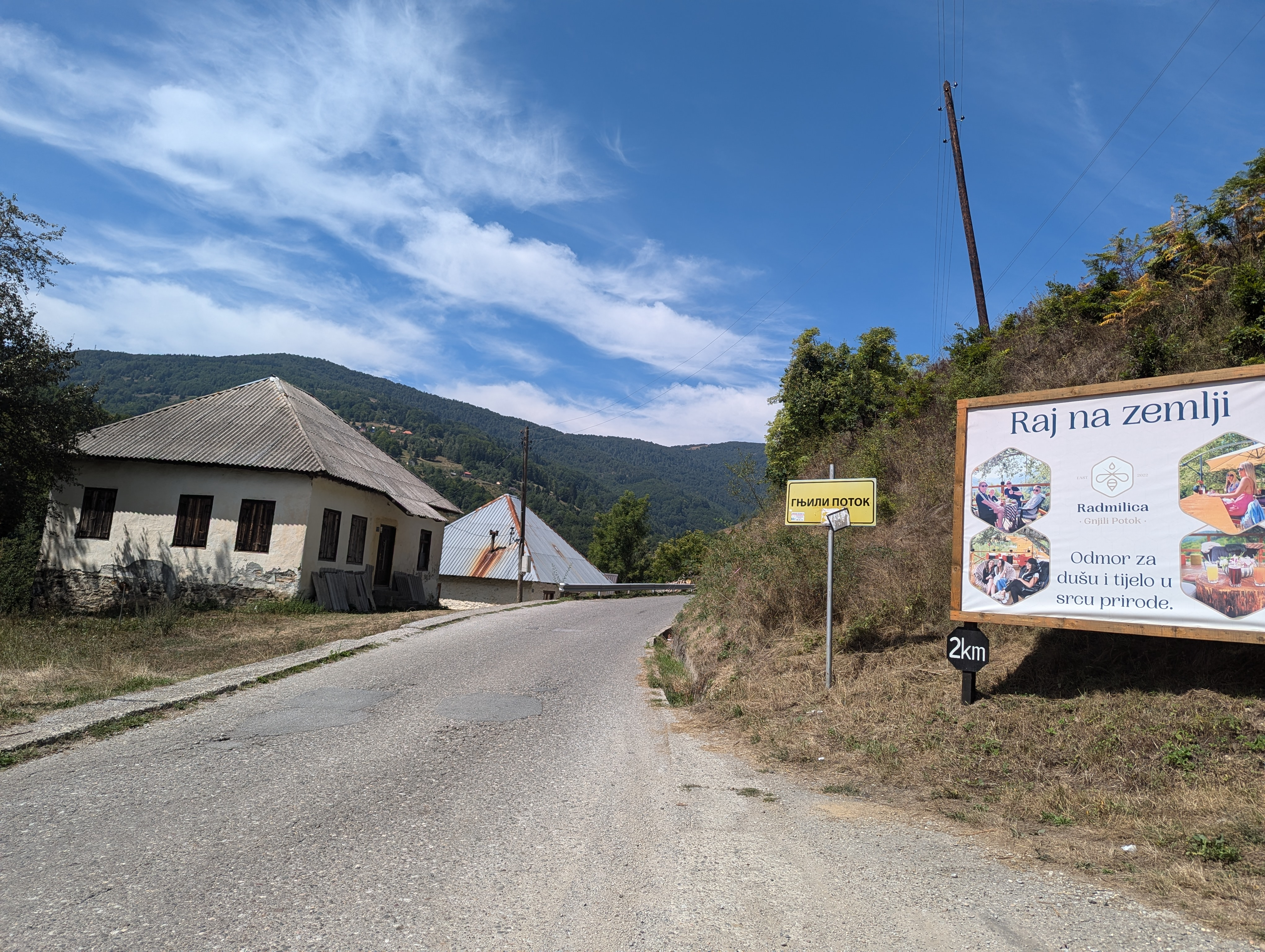

- Location within Montenegro
- Coordinates: 42.742827°N 19.721044°E
- Country: Montenegro
- Municipality: Andrijevica

Population (2023)
  - Total: 43
- Time zone: UTC+1 (CET)
  - Summer (DST): UTC+2 (CEST)

Gnjili Potok (Serbian Cyrillic: Гњили Поток) is a small settlement in the municipality of Andrijevica, Montenegro.

== Demographics ==
According to the 2023 census, it had a population of 43 people.

Ethnicity in 2011
Ethnicity	Number	Percentage
Serbs	36	41.4%
Montenegrins	31	35.6%
other/undeclared	20	23.0%
Total	87	100%
