= Cecuni =

Cecuni Цецуне
- Village
- Location within Montenegro
- Coordinates: 42.674875°N 19.786349°E
- Country: Montenegro
- Municipality: Andrijevica

Population (2023)
  - Total: 76
- Time zone: UTC+1 (CET)
  - Summer (DST): UTC+2 (CEST)

Cecuni (Serbian Cyrillic: Цецуни) is a village in the municipality of Andrijevica, Montenegro.

== Demographics ==
According to the 2023 census, it had a population of 76 people.

Ethnicity in 2011
Ethnicity	Number	Percentage
Serbs	32	58.2%
Montenegrins	19	34.5%
other/undeclared	4	7.2%
Total	55	100%
