= Gornje Luge =

- Village
- Location within Montenegro
- Coordinates: 42.740713°N 19.717095°E
- Country: Montenegro
- Municipality: Andrijevica

Population (2023)
  - Total: 94
- Time zone: UTC+1 (CET)
  - Summer (DST): UTC+2 (CEST)

Gornje Luge (Serbian Cyrillic: Горње Луге) is a small village in the municipality of Andrijevica, Montenegro.

== Demographics ==
According to the 2023 census, it had a population of 94 people.

Ethnicity in 2011
Ethnicity	Number	Percentage
Serbs	86	71.7%
Montenegrins	31	25.8%
other/undeclared	3	2.5%
Total	120	100%
