= Bojovići =

Bojovići Бојовићи
- Village
- Location within Montenegro
- Coordinates: 42.709387°N 19.798136°E
- Country: Montenegro
- Municipality: Andrijevica

Population (2023)
  - Total: 35
- Time zone: UTC+1 (CET)
  - Summer (DST): UTC+2 (CEST)

Bojovići (Serbian Cyrillic: Бојовићи) is a settlement in the municipality of Andrijevica, Montenegro. Mountain range and birth place of the Bojovic clan.

== Demographics ==
According to the 2023 census, it had a population of 35 people.

Ethnicity in 2011
Ethnicity	Number	Percentage
Serbs	32	97.0%
other/undeclared	1	3.0%
Total	33	100%
