= Andželati =

Andželati Сућеска-Анџелате
- Village
- Location within Montenegro
- Coordinates: 42.719809°N 19.797808°E
- Country: Montenegro
- Municipality: Andrijevica

Population (2023)
  - Total: 126
- Time zone: UTC+1 (CET)
  - Summer (DST): UTC+2 (CEST)

Andželati (Serbian Cyrillic: Анџелати) is a village in the municipality of Andrijevica, Montenegro.

== Demographics ==
According to the 2023 census, it had a population of 126 people.

Ethnicity in 2011
Ethnicity	Number	Percentage
Serbs	159	85.9%
Montenegrins	19	10.3%
other/undeclared	7	3.8%
Total	185	100%
