= Mahala, Montenegro =

Mahala Махала
- Village
- Location within Montenegro
- Country: Montenegro
- Municipality: Podgorica

Population (2011)
  - Total: 1,346
- Time zone: UTC+1 (CET)
  - Summer (DST): UTC+2 (CEST)

Mahala (Montenegrin: Махала) is a village in the new Zeta Municipality of Montenegro. Until 2022, it was part of Podgorica Municipality.

== Demographics ==
According to the 2003 census, the village has a population of 1,235 people.

According to the 2011 census, its population was 1,346.

Ethnicity in 2011
Ethnicity	Number	Percentage
Montenegrins	783	58.2%
Serbs	399	29.6%
Croats	7	0.5%
other/undeclared	157	11.7%
Total	1,346	100%
