= Bubanje =

- Village
- Location within Montenegro
- Coordinates: 42.956545°N 19.831973°E
- Country: Montenegro
- Municipality: Berane

Population (2023)
  - Total: 128
- Time zone: UTC+1 (CET)
  - Summer (DST): UTC+2 (CEST)

Bubanje (Serbian Cyrillic: Бубање) is a village in the municipality of Berane, Montenegro.

== Demographics ==
According to the 2023 census, its population was 128.

Ethnicity in 2011
Ethnicity	Number	Percentage
Serbs	98	54.4%
Montenegrins	73	40.6%
other/undeclared	9	3.4%
Total	180	100%
