= Ulotina =

Ulotina Улотина
- Village
- Location within Montenegro
- Coordinates: 42.683276°N 19.845937°E
- Country: Montenegro
- Municipality: Andrijevica

Population (2023)
  - Total: 171
- Time zone: UTC+1 (CET)
  - Summer (DST): UTC+2 (CEST)

Ulotina (Serbian Cyrillic: Улотина) is a village in the municipality of Andrijevica, Montenegro.

== Demographics ==
According to the 2023 census, it had a population of 171 people.

Ethnicity in 2011
Ethnicity	Number	Percentage
Serbs	134	59.6%
Montenegrins	68	30.2%
other/undeclared	23	10.2%
Total	225	100%
