= Dulipolje =

Dulipolje Дулипоље
- Village
- Location within Montenegro
- Coordinates: 42.694943°N 19.748604°E
- Country: Montenegro
- Municipality: Andrijevica

Population (2023)
  - Total: 63
- Time zone: UTC+1 (CET)
  - Summer (DST): UTC+2 (CEST)

Dulipolje (Serbian Cyrillic: Дулипоље) is a village in the municipality of Andrijevica, Montenegro.

== Demographics ==
According to the 2023 census, it had a population of 63 people.

Ethnicity in 2011
Ethnicity	Number	Percentage
Serbs	49	55.1%
Montenegrins	39	43.8%
other/undeclared	1	1.1%
Total	89	100%
