= Dragosava =

Dragosava Драгосава
- Village
- Location within Montenegro
- Coordinates: 42.893190°N 19.893857°E
- Country: Montenegro
- Municipality: Berane

Population (2023)
  - Total: 69
- Time zone: UTC+1 (CET)
  - Summer (DST): UTC+2 (CEST)

Dragosava (Serbian Cyrillic: Драгосава) is a village in the municipality of Berane, Montenegro.

== Demographics ==
According to the 2023 census, its population was 69.

Ethnicity in 2011
Ethnicity	Number	Percentage
Serbs	78	65.0%
Montenegrins	39	32.5%
other/undeclared	3	2.5%
Total	120	100%
