= Bijelo Polje, Zeta =

Bijelo Polje Бијело Поље
- Village
- Location within Montenegro
- Country: Montenegro
- Municipality: Podgorica

Population (2011)
  - Total: 823
- Time zone: UTC+1 (CET)
  - Summer (DST): UTC+2 (CEST)

Bijelo Polje (Cyrillic: Бијело Поље) is a village in the new Zeta Municipality of Montenegro. Until 2022, it was part of Podgorica Municipality.

== Demographics ==
According to the 2011 census, its population was 823.

Ethnicity in 2011
Ethnicity	Number	Percentage
Montenegrins	592	71.9%
Serbs	173	21.0%
other/undeclared	58	7.0%
Total	823	100%
