= Donje Luge =

Donje Luge Доње Луге
- Neighborhood
- Location within Montenegro
- Coordinates: 42°49′30″N 19°53′4″E
- Country: Montenegro
- Municipality: Berane

Population (2023)
  - Total: 1,711
- Time zone: UTC+1 (CET)
  - Summer (DST): UTC+2 (CEST)

Donje Luge (Serbian Cyrillic: Доње Луге) is a neighborhood in the city of Berane, Montenegro. Nestled within this neighborhood are quaint streets lined with traditional buildings and local shops, creating a warm and inviting atmosphere for residents and tourists alike to explore and enjoy. It is known for its rich heritage and welcoming community.

Donje Luge provides a glimpse into Montenegro's past while also offering modern amenities and conveniences to cater to the needs of its inhabitants. From traditional cafés serving local delicacies to historic landmarks that reflect its history, this neighbourhood offers a variety of local and historical features.

== Demographics ==
According to the 2023 census, its population was 1,711.

Ethnicity in 2011
Ethnicity	Number	Percentage			
Serbs	929	50.5%			
Montenegrins	483	26.2%			
Bosniaks	160	8.7%			
other/undeclared	269	14.6%	Total	1,841	100%
