= Skakavac, Berane Municipality =

Skakavac
- Village
- Location within Montenegro
- Coordinates: 42.905684°N 19.867679°E
- Country: Montenegro
- Municipality: Berane

Population (2023)
  - Total: 23
- Time zone: UTC+1 (CET)
  - Summer (DST): UTC+2 (CEST)

Skakavac (Serbian Cyrillic: Скакавац) is a village in the municipality of Berane, Montenegro.

== Demographics ==
According to the 2023 census, its population was 23.

Ethnicity in 2011
Ethnicity	Number	Percentage
Serbs	70	63.6%
Montenegrins	22	20.0%
Bosniaks	13	11.8%
other/undeclared	5	4.5%
Total	110	100%
