= Đenđinovići =

Đenđinovići Ђенђиновићи
- Village
- Location within Montenegro
- Coordinates: 42.146093°N 19.046218°E
- Country: Montenegro
- Municipality: Bar

Population (2011)
  - Total: 352
- Time zone: UTC+1 (CET)
  - Summer (DST): UTC+2 (CEST)

Đenđinovići (Cyrillic: Ђенђиновићи) is a village in the municipality of Bar, Montenegro.

== Demographics ==
According to the 2011 census, its population was 352.

Ethnicity in 2011
Ethnicity	Number	Percentage
Montenegrins	161	45.7%
Serbs	144	40.9%
other/undeclared	47	13.4%
Total	352	100%
