= Zagrađe, Berane Municipality =

Zagrađe Заграђе
- Village
- Location within Montenegro
- Coordinates: 42.871016°N 19.935121°E
- Country: Montenegro
- Municipality: Berane

Population (2023)
  - Total: 145
- Time zone: UTC+1 (CET)
  - Summer (DST): UTC+2 (CEST)

Zagrađe (Serbian Cyrillic: Заграђе) is a village in the municipality of Berane, Montenegro.

== Demographics ==
According to the 2023 census, its population was 145.

Ethnicity in 2011
Ethnicity	Number	Percentage
Serbs	141	62.4%
Montenegrins	65	28.8%
other/undeclared	20	8.8%
Total	226	100%
