= Klikovače =

- Village
- Location within Montenegro
- Coordinates: 42.499914°N 19.185180°E
- Country: Montenegro
- Municipality: Danilovgrad

Population (2011)
  - Total: 422
- Time zone: UTC+1 (CET)
  - Summer (DST): UTC+2 (CEST)

Klikovače (Serbian Cyrillic: Кликоваче) is a village in the municipality of Danilovgrad, Montenegro.

== Demographics ==
According to the 2011 census, its population was 422.

Ethnicity in 2011
Ethnicity	Number	Percentage
Montenegrins	248	58.8%
Serbs	128	30.3%
other/undeclared	46	10.9%
Total	422	100%
