= Donje Zaostro =

Donje Zaostro Доње Заостро
- Village
- Location within Montenegro
- Coordinates: 42.885969°N 19.856272°E
- Country: Montenegro
- Municipality: Berane

Population (2023)
  - Total: 83
- Time zone: UTC+1 (CET)
  - Summer (DST): UTC+2 (CEST)

Donje Zaostro (Serbian Cyrillic: Доње Заостро) is a village in the municipality of Berane, Montenegro.

== Demographics ==
According to the 2023 census, its population was 83.

Ethnicity in 2011
Ethnicity	Number	Percentage
Serbs	80	58.4%
Montenegrins	38	27.7%
other/undeclared	19	13.9%
Total	137	100%
