= Mašte =

Mašte Маште
- Village
- Location within Montenegro
- Coordinates: 42.880027°N 19.888075°E
- Country: Montenegro
- Municipality: Berane

Population (2023)
  - Total: 94
- Time zone: UTC+1 (CET)
  - Summer (DST): UTC+2 (CEST)

Mašte (Serbian Cyrillic: Маште) is a village in the municipality of Berane, Montenegro.

== Demographics ==
According to the 2023 census, its population was 94.

Ethnicity in 2011
Ethnicity	Number	Percentage
Serbs	88	59.1%
Montenegrins	49	32.9%
other/undeclared	12	8.1%
Total	149	100%
