= Zagorje, Berane Municipality =

Zagorje
- Village
- Location within Montenegro
- Coordinates: 42.818948°N 19.901827°E
- Country: Montenegro
- Municipality: Berane

Population (2023)
  - Total: 175
- Time zone: UTC+1 (CET)
  - Summer (DST): UTC+2 (CEST)

Zagorje (Serbian Cyrillic: Загорје) is a village in the municipality of Berane, Montenegro.

== Demographics ==
According to the 2023 census, its population was 177.

Ethnicity in 2011
Ethnicity	Number	Percentage
Serbs	165	67.9%
Montenegrins	58	23.9%
other/undeclared	20	8.2%
Total	243	100%
