= Pešca =

Pešca Пешца
- Neighborhood
- Location within Montenegro
- Coordinates: 42°49′26″N 19°51′32″E
- Country: Montenegro
- Municipality: Berane

Population (2023)
  - Total: 1,805
- Time zone: UTC+1 (CET)
  - Summer (DST): UTC+2 (CEST)

Pešca (Serbian Cyrillic: Пешца) is a neighborhood in the city of Berane, Montenegro.

== Demographics ==
According to the 2023 census, its population was 1,805.

Ethnicity in 2011
Ethnicity	Number	Percentage
Serbs	1,140	60.2%
Montenegrins	618	32.6%
other/undeclared	136	7.2%
Total	1,894	100%
