= Mezgalji =

Mezgalji Мезгаљи
- Village
- Location within Montenegro
- Coordinates: 42.752906°N 19.873941°E
- Country: Montenegro
- Municipality: Berane

Population (2023)
  - Total: 120
- Time zone: UTC+1 (CET)
  - Summer (DST): UTC+2 (CEST)

Mezgalji (Serbian Cyrillic: Мезгаљи) is a village in the municipality of Berane, Montenegro.

== Demographics ==
According to the 2023 census, its population was 120.

Ethnicity in 2011
Ethnicity	Number	Percentage
Serbs	82	47.1%
Montenegrins	86	49.4%
other/undeclared	6	3.4%
Total	174	100%
