= Milovići =

Milovići Миловићи
- Village
- Location within Montenegro
- Coordinates: 42.399560°N 18.672204°E
- Country: Montenegro
- Region: Coastal
- Municipality: Tivat

Population (2011)
  - Total: 48
- Time zone: UTC+1 (CET)
  - Summer (DST): UTC+2 (CEST)

Milovići (Montenegrin: Миловићи) is a small settlement in the municipality of Tivat, Montenegro. It is located on the Luštica.

== Demographics ==
According to the 2011 census, it had a population of 48 people.

Ethnicity in 2011
Ethnicity	Number	Percentage
Serbs	24	50%
Croats	6	12.5%
other/undeclared	18	37.5%
Total	48	100%
