= Donja Ržanica =

Donja Ržanica Доња Ржаница
- Village
- Location within Montenegro
- Coordinates: 42.809372°N 19.875408°E
- Country: Montenegro
- Municipality: Berane

Population (2023)
  - Total: 868
- Time zone: UTC+1 (CET)
  - Summer (DST): UTC+2 (CEST)

Donja Ržanica (Serbian Cyrillic: Доња Ржаница) is a village in the municipality of Berane, Montenegro.

== Demographics ==
According to the 2023 census, its population was 868.

Ethnicity in 2011
| Ethnicity | Number | Percentage |
|---|---|---|
| Montenegrins | 571 | 62.7% |
| Serbs | 287 | 31.5% |
| other/undeclared | 52 | 5.7% |
| Total | 910 | 100% |
