= Rijeka Marsenića =

- Village
- Location within Montenegro
- Coordinates: 42.781550°N 19.837638°E
- Country: Montenegro
- Municipality: Andrijevica

Population (2023)
  - Total: 159
- Time zone: UTC+1 (CET)
  - Summer (DST): UTC+2 (CEST)

Rijeka Marsenića (Serbian Cyrillic: Ријека Марсенића) is a village in the municipality of Andrijevica, Montenegro.

== Demographics ==
According to the 2023 census, it had a population of 159 people.

Ethnicity in 2011
Ethnicity	Number	Percentage
Serbs	193	64.8%
Montenegrins	78	26.2%
other/undeclared	27	9.0%
Total	298	100%
