= Jošice =

Village in Herceg Novi, Montenegro

Jošice Јошице
- Village
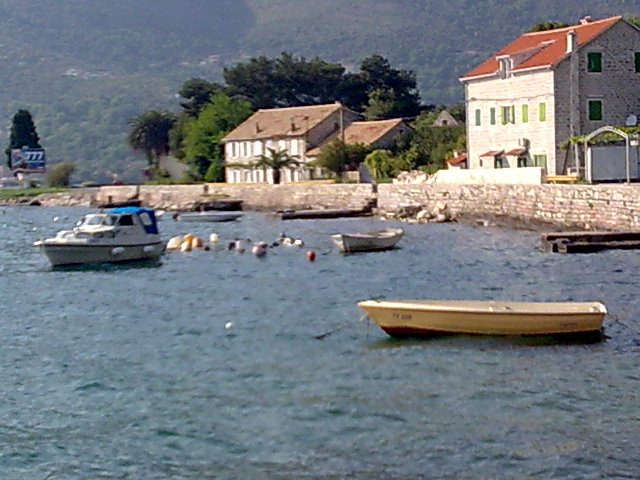

- Location within Montenegro
- Coordinates: 42.462483°N 18.671949°E
- Country: Montenegro
- Region: Coastal
- Municipality: Herceg Novi

Population (2011)
  - Total: 406
- Time zone: UTC+1 (CET)
  - Summer (DST): UTC+2 (CEST)

Jošice (Montenegrin: Јошице) is a village in the municipality of Herceg Novi, Montenegro.

== Demographics ==
According to the 2011 census, its population was 406.

Ethnicity in 2011
| Ethnicity | Number | Percentage |
|---|---|---|
| Serbs | 185 | 45.6% |
| Montenegrins | 140 | 34.5% |
| Croats | 27 | 6.7% |
| Roma | 9 | 2.2% |
| other/undeclared | 45 | 11.1% |
| Total | 406 | 100% |
