= Prisoja =

Prisoja Присоја
- Village
- Location within Montenegro
- Coordinates: 42.745477°N 19.780147°E
- Country: Montenegro
- Municipality: Andrijevica

Population (2023)
  - Total: 566
- Time zone: UTC+1 (CET)
  - Summer (DST): UTC+2 (CEST)

Prisoja (Serbian Cyrillic: Присоја) is a village in the municipality of Andrijevica, Montenegro.

== Demographics ==
According to the 2023 census, it had a population of 566 people.

Ethnicity in 2011
Ethnicity	Number	Percentage
Montenegrins	167	49.3%
Serbs	155	45.7%
other/undeclared	17	5.0%
Total	339	100%
