= Podi, Bar =

Podi Поди Podë
- Village
- Location within Montenegro
- Coordinates: 42.072274°N 19.143429°E
- Country: Montenegro
- Municipality: Bar

Population (2011)
  - Total: 192
- Time zone: UTC+1 (CET)
  - Summer (DST): UTC+2 (CEST)

Podi (Montenegrin Cyrillic: Поди; Albanian: Podë) is a village in the municipality of Bar, Montenegro.

== Demographics ==
According to the 2011 census, its population was 192.

Ethnicity in 2011
Ethnicity	Number	Percentage
Montenegrins	100	52.1%
Albanians	31	16.1%
Bosniaks	16	6.8%
Serbs	13	6.8%
other/undeclared	32	16.7%
Total	192	100%
