= Košutići =

Košutići Кошутићи
- Village
- Location within Montenegro
- Coordinates: 42.695232°N 19.771675°E
- Country: Montenegro
- Municipality: Andrijevica

Population (2023)
  - Total: 76
- Time zone: UTC+1 (CET)
  - Summer (DST): UTC+2 (CEST)

Košutići (Serbian Cyrillic: Кошутићи) is a small village in the municipality of Andrijevica, Montenegro.

== Demographics ==
According to the 2023 census, it had a population of 76 people.

Ethnicity in 2011
Ethnicity	Number	Percentage
Serbs	70	58.3%
Montenegrins	38	31.7%
other/undeclared	12	10.0%
Total	120	100%
