= Seoca, Andrijevica =

Seoca Сеоце
- Village
- Location within Montenegro
- Coordinates: 42.735087°N 19.802436°E
- Country: Montenegro
- Municipality: Andrijevica

Population (2023)
  - Total: 93
- Time zone: UTC+1 (CET)
  - Summer (DST): UTC+2 (CEST)

Seoca (Serbian Cyrillic: Сеоца) is a village in the municipality of Andrijevica, Montenegro.

== Demographics ==
According to the 2023 census, it had a population of 93 people.

Ethnicity in 2011
Ethnicity	Number	Percentage
Serbs	91	87.5%
Montenegrins	11	10.6%
other/undeclared	2	2.0%
Total	104	100%
