= Selišta, Kolašin =

Selišta Селишта
- Village
- Location within Montenegro
- Coordinates: 42.829103°N 19.545641°E
- Country: Montenegro
- Region: Northern
- Municipality: Kolašin

Population (2011)
  - Total: 200
- Time zone: UTC+1 (CET)
  - Summer (DST): UTC+2 (CEST)

Selišta (Montenegrin Cyrillic: Селишта) is a village in the municipality of Kolašin, Montenegro.

== Demographics ==
According to the 2011 census, its population was 200.

Ethnicity in 2011
Ethnicity	Number	Percentage
Montenegrins	160	80.0%
Serbs	18	9.0%
other/undeclared	22	11.0%
Total	200	100%
