= Sasovići =

Village in Herceg Novi, Montenegro

Sasovići Сасовићи
- Village
- Location within Montenegro
- Coordinates: 42.463772°N 18.570059°E
- Country: Montenegro
- Region: Coastal
- Municipality: Herceg Novi

Population (2011)
  - Total: 422
- Time zone: UTC+1 (CET)
  - Summer (DST): UTC+2 (CEST)

Sasovići (Montenegrin: Сасовићи) is a village in the municipality of Herceg Novi, Montenegro.

== Demographics ==
According to the 2011 census, its population was 422.

Ethnicity in 2011
| Ethnicity | Number | Percentage |
|---|---|---|
| Serbs | 229 | 54.3% |
| Montenegrins | 130 | 30.8% |
| other/undeclared | 63 | 14.9% |
| Total | 422 | 100% |
