= Dapsići =

Dapsići Дапсићи
- Village
- Location within Montenegro
- Coordinates: 42.844184°N 19.921338°E
- Country: Montenegro
- Municipality: Berane

Population (2023)
  - Total: 499
- Time zone: UTC+1 (CET)
  - Summer (DST): UTC+2 (CEST)

Dapsići (Serbian Cyrillic: Дапсићи) is a village in the municipality of Berane, Montenegro.

== Demographics ==
According to the 2023 census, its population was 499.

Ethnicity in 2011
Ethnicity	Number	Percentage
Serbs	548	81.3%
Montenegrins	103	15.3%
other/undeclared	23	3.4%
Total	674	100%
