= Malenza =

Malenza Маленза
- Village
- Location within Montenegro
- Coordinates: 42.494348°N 19.090986°E
- Country: Montenegro
- Municipality: Danilovgrad

Population (2011)
  - Total: 119
- Time zone: UTC+1 (CET)
  - Summer (DST): UTC+2 (CEST)

Malenza (Montenegrin Cyrillic: Маленза) is a small village in the municipality of Danilovgrad, Montenegro.

== Demographics ==
According to the 2011 census, its population was 119.

Ethnicity in 2011
Ethnicity	Number	Percentage
Montenegrins	98	82.4%
Serbs	15	12.6%
other/undeclared	6	5.0%
Total	119	100%
