= Zaljevo =

Zaljevo Заљево Zalefi
- Village
- Location within Montenegro
- Coordinates: 42.070157°N 19.131088°E
- Country: Montenegro
- Municipality: Bar

Population (2011)
  - Total: 685
- Time zone: UTC+1 (CET)
  - Summer (DST): UTC+2 (CEST)

Zaljevo (Serbian Cyrillic: Заљево; Albanian: Zalefi) is a village in the municipality of Bar, Montenegro.

== Demographics ==
According to the 2011 census, its population was 685.

Ethnicity in 2011
| Ethnicity | Number | Percentage |
|---|---|---|
| Montenegrins | 385 | 56.2% |
| Bosniaks | 71 | 10.4% |
| Albanians | 57 | 8.3% |
| Serbs | 11 | 1.6% |
| other/undeclared | 161 | 23.5% |
| Total | 685 | 100% |
