= Ðurići =

Village in Herceg Novi, Montenegro

Ðurići Ђурићи
- Village
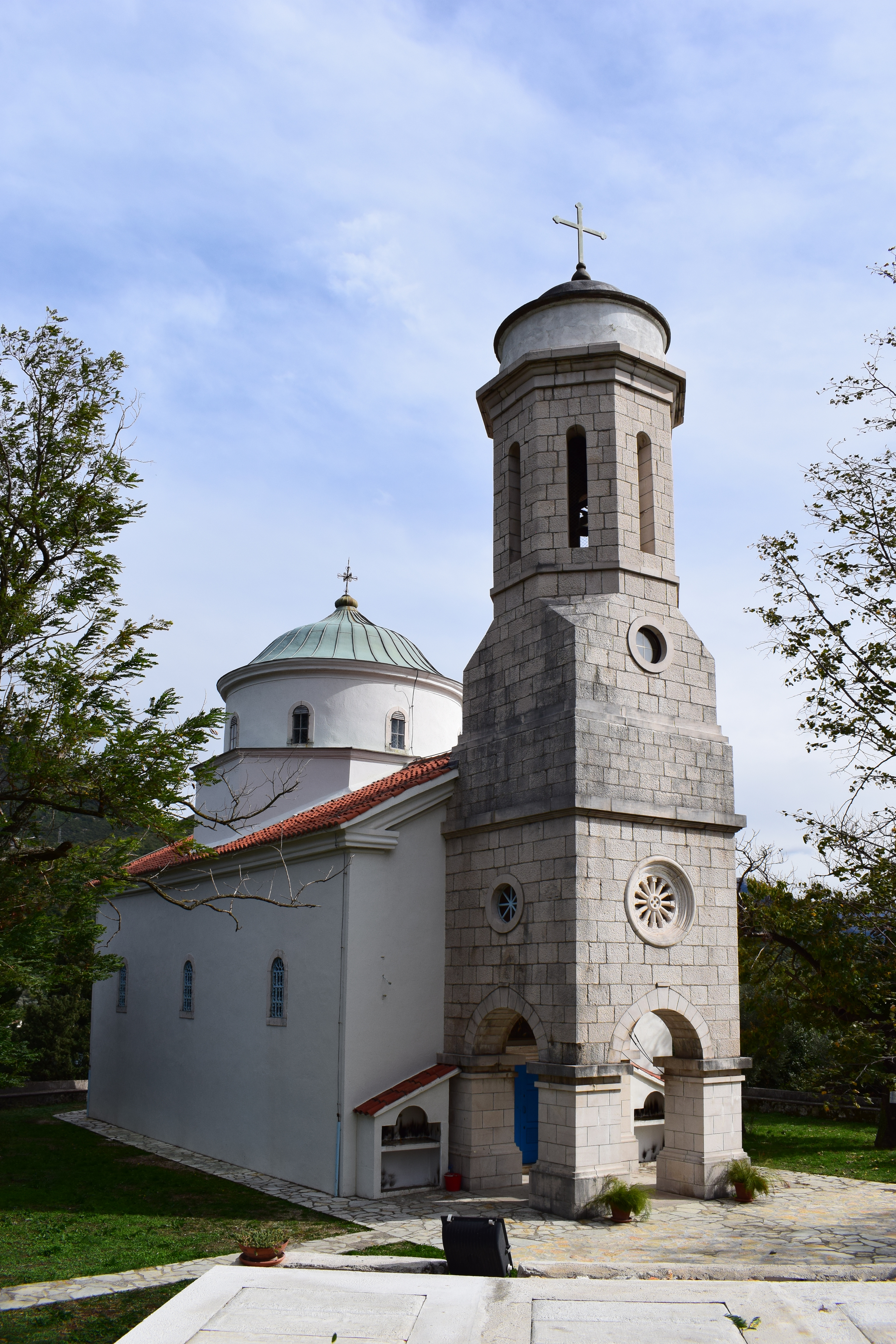
- Sv. Nedjelja Church in Kamenari, Ðurići

- Location within Montenegro
- Coordinates: 42.471826°N 18.680572°E
- Country: Montenegro
- Region: Coastal
- Municipality: Herceg Novi

Population (2011)
  - Total: 300
- Time zone: UTC+1 (CET)
  - Summer (DST): UTC+2 (CEST)

Ðurići (Montenegrin: Ђурићи) is a village in the municipality of Herceg Novi, Montenegro. The settlement includes the village of Kamenari and is located along the coast of the Verige Strait.

== Demographics ==
According to the 2011 census, its population was 300.

Ethnicity in 2011
Ethnicity	Number	Percentage
Serbs	102	34.0%
Montenegrins	80	26.7%
Croats	41	13.7%
other/undeclared	77	25.7%
Total	300	100%
