= Viti Do =

- Village
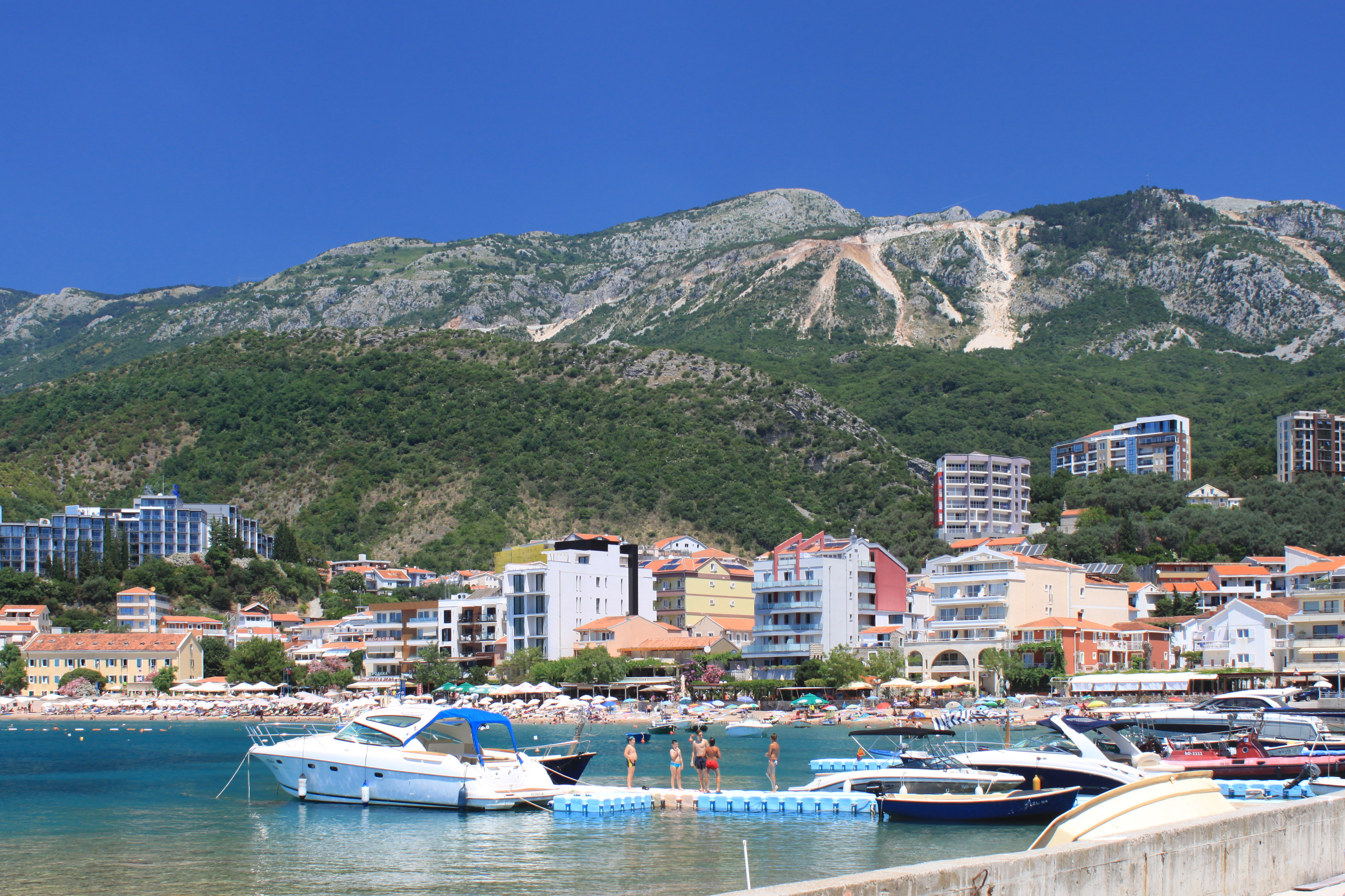

- Location within Montenegro
- Coordinates: 42.280466°N 18.881694°E
- Country: Montenegro
- Region: Coastal
- Municipality: Budva

Population (2011)
  - Total: 212
- Time zone: UTC+1 (CET)
  - Summer (DST): UTC+2 (CEST)

Viti Do (Montenegrin: Вити До) is a village in the municipality of Budva, Montenegro.

== Demographics ==
According to the 2011 census, its population was 212.

Ethnicity in 2011
Ethnicity	Number	Percentage
Serbs	128	60.4%
Montenegrins	70	33.0%
other/undeclared	14	6.6%
Total	212	100%
