= Provodina =

Village in Herceg Novi, Montenegro

Provodina Проводина
- Village
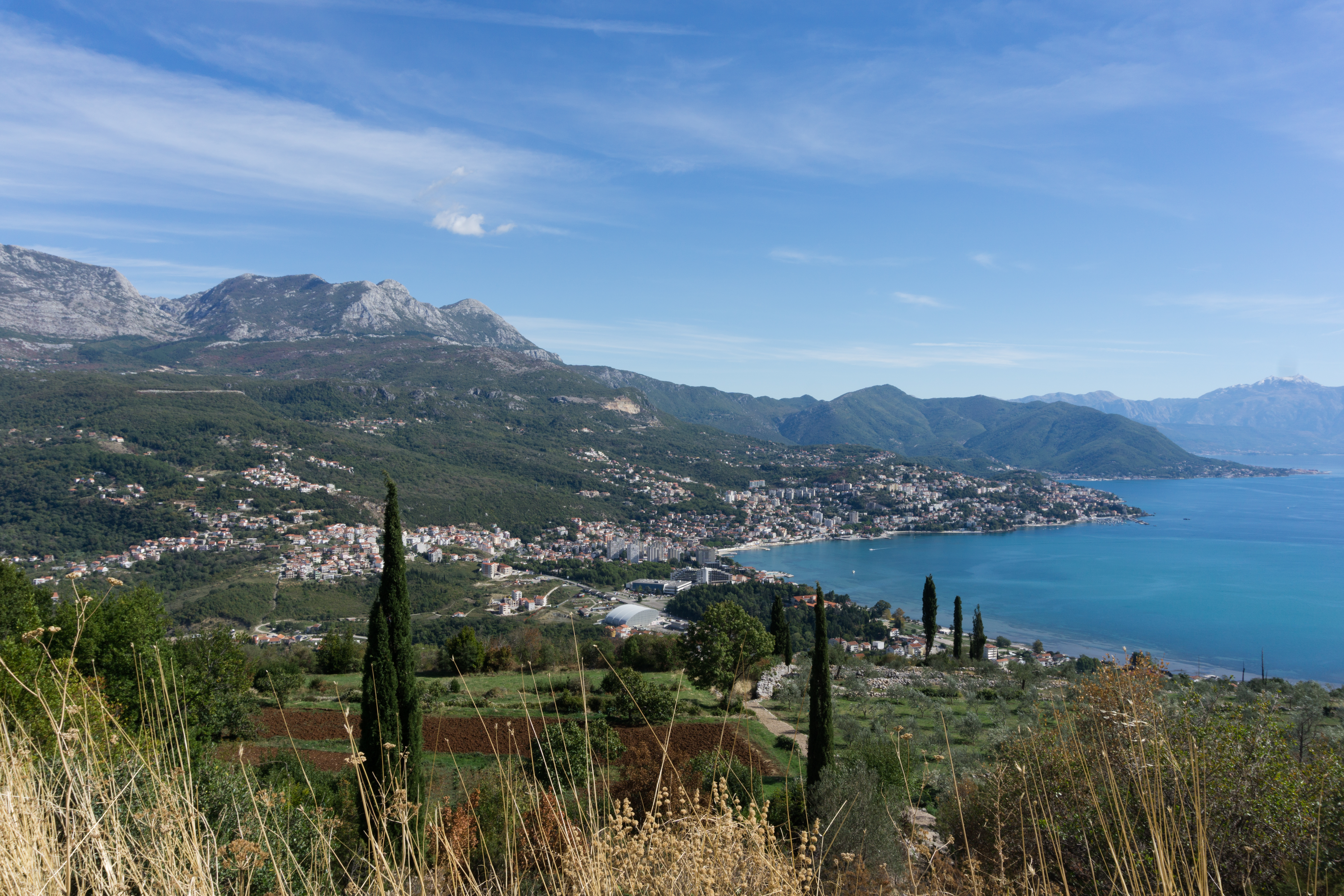

- Location within Montenegro
- Coordinates: 42°26′31″N 18°30′04″E
- Country: Montenegro
- Region: Coastal
- Municipality: Herceg Novi

Population (2011)
  - Total: 822
- Time zone: UTC+1 (CET)
  - Summer (DST): UTC+2 (CEST)

Provodina (Montenegrin: Проводина) is a village in the municipality of Herceg Novi, Montenegro.

The settlement of Provodina consists of several hamlets, the most important of which are Njivice and Žvinje. It is close to Igalo and has access to the Adriatic Sea.

== Demographics ==
According to the 2011 census, its population was 822.

Ethnicity in 2011
Ethnicity	Number	Percentage
Serbs	466	56.7%
Montenegrins	211	25.7%
Croats	13	1.6%
Egyptians	12	1.5%
other/undeclared	120	14.6%
Total	822	100%
