= Rovačko Trebaljevo =

Rovačko Trebaljevo Ровачко Требаљево
- Village
- Location within Montenegro
- Coordinates: 42.864885°N 19.532024°E
- Country: Montenegro
- Region: Northern
- Municipality: Kolašin

Population (2011)
  - Total: 208
- Time zone: UTC+1 (CET)
  - Summer (DST): UTC+2 (CEST)

Rovačko Trebaljevo (Montenegrin Cyrillic: Ровачко Требаљево) is a village in the municipality of Kolašin, Montenegro.

== Demographics ==
According to the 2011 census, its population was 208.

Ethnicity in 2011
Ethnicity	Number	Percentage
Montenegrins	113	54.3%
Serbs	84	40.4%
other/undeclared	11	5.3%
Total	208	100%
