= Radigojno =

Radigojno Радигојно
- Village
- Location within Montenegro
- Coordinates: 42.839840°N 19.531090°E
- Country: Montenegro
- Region: Northern
- Municipality: Kolašin

Population (2011)
  - Total: 123
- Time zone: UTC+1 (CET)
  - Summer (DST): UTC+2 (CEST)

Radigojno (Montenegrin Cyrillic: Радигојно) is a village in the municipality of Kolašin, Montenegro.

== Demographics ==
According to the 2011 census, its population was 123.

Ethnicity in 2011
Ethnicity	Number	Percentage
Montenegrins	89	72.4%
Serbs	32	26.0%
other/undeclared	2	1.6%
Total	123	100%
