= Trešnjevo, Andrijevica =

Trešnjevo Трешњево
- Village
- Location within Montenegro
- Coordinates: 42.765867°N 19.812153°E
- Country: Montenegro
- Municipality: Andrijevica

Population (2023)
  - Total: 367
- Time zone: UTC+1 (CET)
  - Summer (DST): UTC+2 (CEST)

Trešnjevo (Montenegrin: Трешњево) is a village in the municipality of Andrijevica, Montenegro.

== Demographics ==
According to the 2023 census, it had a population of 367 people.

Ethnicity in 2011
| Ethnicity | Number | Percentage |
|---|---|---|
| Serbs | 256 | 55.5% |
| Montenegrins | 185 | 40.1% |
| other/undeclared | 20 | 4.3% |
| Total | 461 | 100% |
