= Đulići, Montenegro =

Đulići Ђулићи
- Village
- Location within Montenegro
- Coordinates: 42.693505°N 19.792617°E
- Country: Montenegro
- Municipality: Andrijevica

Population (2023)
  - Total: 49
- Time zone: UTC+1 (CET)
  - Summer (DST): UTC+2 (CEST)

Đulići (Serbian Cyrillic: Ђулићи) is a village in the municipality of Andrijevica, Montenegro.

== Demographics ==
According to the 2023 census, it had a population of 49 people.

Ethnicity in 2011
Ethnicity	Number	Percentage
Serbs	68	67.3%
Montenegrins	27	26.7%
other/undeclared	6	6.0%
Total	101	100%
