= Pridvorica, Šavnik =

Pridvorica Придворица
- Village
- Location within Montenegro
- Country: Montenegro
- Region: Northern
- Municipality: Šavnik

Population (2011)
  - Total: 10
- Time zone: UTC+1 (CET)
  - Summer (DST): UTC+2 (CEST)

Pridvorica (Montenegrin Cyrillic: Придворица) is a small village in the municipality of Šavnik, Montenegro.

== Demographics ==
According to the 2011 census, its population was 10, all but three of them Serbs.
