= Zabrđe, Andrijevica =

Zabrđe Забрђе
- Village
- Location within Montenegro
- Coordinates: 42.764245°N 19.779053°E
- Country: Montenegro
- Municipality: Andrijevica

Population (2023)
  - Total: 165
- Time zone: UTC+1 (CET)
  - Summer (DST): UTC+2 (CEST)

Zabrđe (Serbian Cyrillic: Забрђе) is a village in the municipality of Andrijevica, Montenegro.

== Demographics ==
According to the 2023 census, it had a population of 165 people.

Ethnicity in 2011
| Ethnicity | Number | Percentage |
|---|---|---|
| Serbs | 123 | 49.6% |
| Montenegrins | 111 | 44.8% |
| other/undeclared | 14 | 5.6% |
| Total | 248 | 100% |
