= Vinicka, Berane Municipality =

Vinicka Виницка
- Village
- Location within Montenegro
- Coordinates: 42.798852°N 19.831433°E
- Country: Montenegro
- Municipality: Berane

Population (2023)
  - Total: 458
- Time zone: UTC+1 (CET)
  - Summer (DST): UTC+2 (CEST)

Vinicka (Serbian Cyrillic: Виницка) is a village in the municipality of Berane, Montenegro.

== Demographics ==
According to the 2023 census, its population was 458.

Ethnicity in 2011
Ethnicity	Number	Percentage
Serbs	394	70.6%
Montenegrins	150	26.9%
other/undeclared	14	2.5%
Total	558	100%
