= Prečista Krajinska =

Church ruins in Montenegro

Coordinates: 42.0838°N 19.3180°E

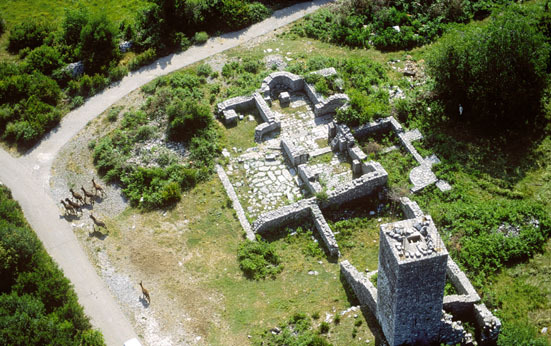
Ruins of the church.

The Prečista Krajinska (Serbian Cyrillic: Пречиста Крајинска, lit. 'Immaculate (Mary) of the (Shkodran) Frontier') is the name for the ruins of a church located in the region of Skadarska Krajina, southeastern Montenegro. It was the second burial site of Jovan Vladimir, the ruler of Duklja (ca. 1000–1016), after his widow Kosara renewed it and transferred his remains from Prespa. The relics drew many devotees to the church, which became a center of pilgrimage. Kosara was interred in the church, at the feet of her husband, on her request. In around 1215—when Krajina was under the rule of Serbian Grand Prince Stefan Nemanjić—the relics were presumably removed from this church and transported to Dyrrhachium by the troops of Michael I, the despot of Epirus. At that time Despot Michael had briefly captured from Serbia the city of Skadar, which is only about 20 km (12 mi) east of the church. The monastery was mentioned in 1417 in a Cetinje manuscript. The Balšić family reconstructed the monastery in the 15th century. The monastery became the seat of a Catholic bishopric, as part of the Catholic-Venetian expansion. The bishop, who was employed in an Orthodox region, saw resistance in the area from the Serbian Orthodox. At the beginning of the 20th century, the population surrounding the Church ruins were Muslims.
