= Castus =

Castus is a Latin word meaning clean and pure.

- Lucius Artorius Castus, Roman general
- Castus and Emilius, Roman martyrs and saints
- Castus (rebel), Roman rebel gladiator in the Third Servile War

== See also ==
- Vitex agnus-castus, a Mediterranean plant, also called Chaste Tree, Chasteberry, or Monk's Pepper
