= Skadarska Krajina =

Geographical region in southeastern Montenegro

Coordinates: 42.10068°N 19.159998°E

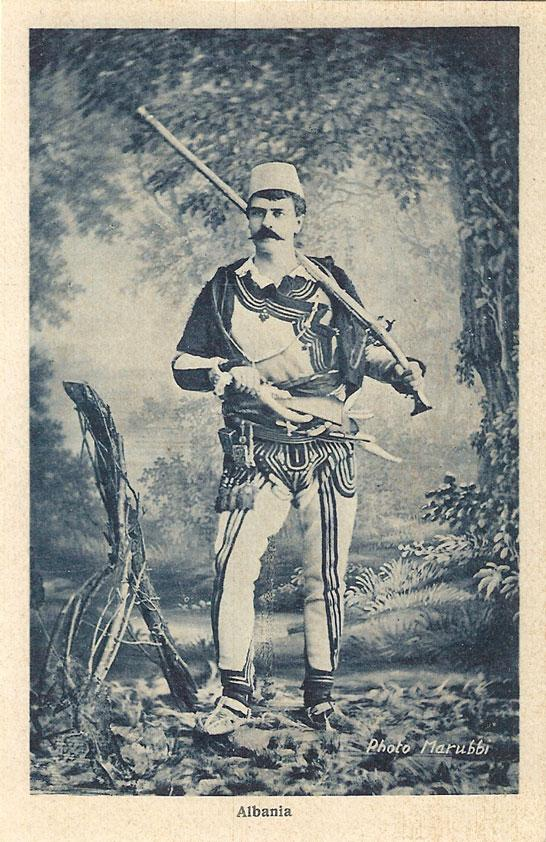
Albanian man from Krajë

Skadarska Krajina (Montenegrin Cyrillic: Скадарска Крајина, lit. 'Skadar Frontier'), generally known simply as Craina or Kraja (Montenegrin Cyrillic: Крајина, pronounced [krâjina]; Albanian: Krajë) is a geographical region in southeastern Montenegro stretching from the southern coast of Lake Skadar to the mountain of Rumija, comprising several villages. It is inhabited entirely by Albanians. The area is divided between the municipalities of Bar and Ulcinj.

Based on the last parts of the Priest of Duklja, Krajina was a political centre of Duklja. Vladimir, the ruler of Duklja (ca. 1000–1016), was interred in the Prečista Krajinska church by his widow Theodora Kosara, who was also buried in the church. The oldest published Albanian book, Meshari ("the Missal"), was written by Albanian Catholic priest Gjon Buzuku who was born in this region's village of Livari.

== Geography ==
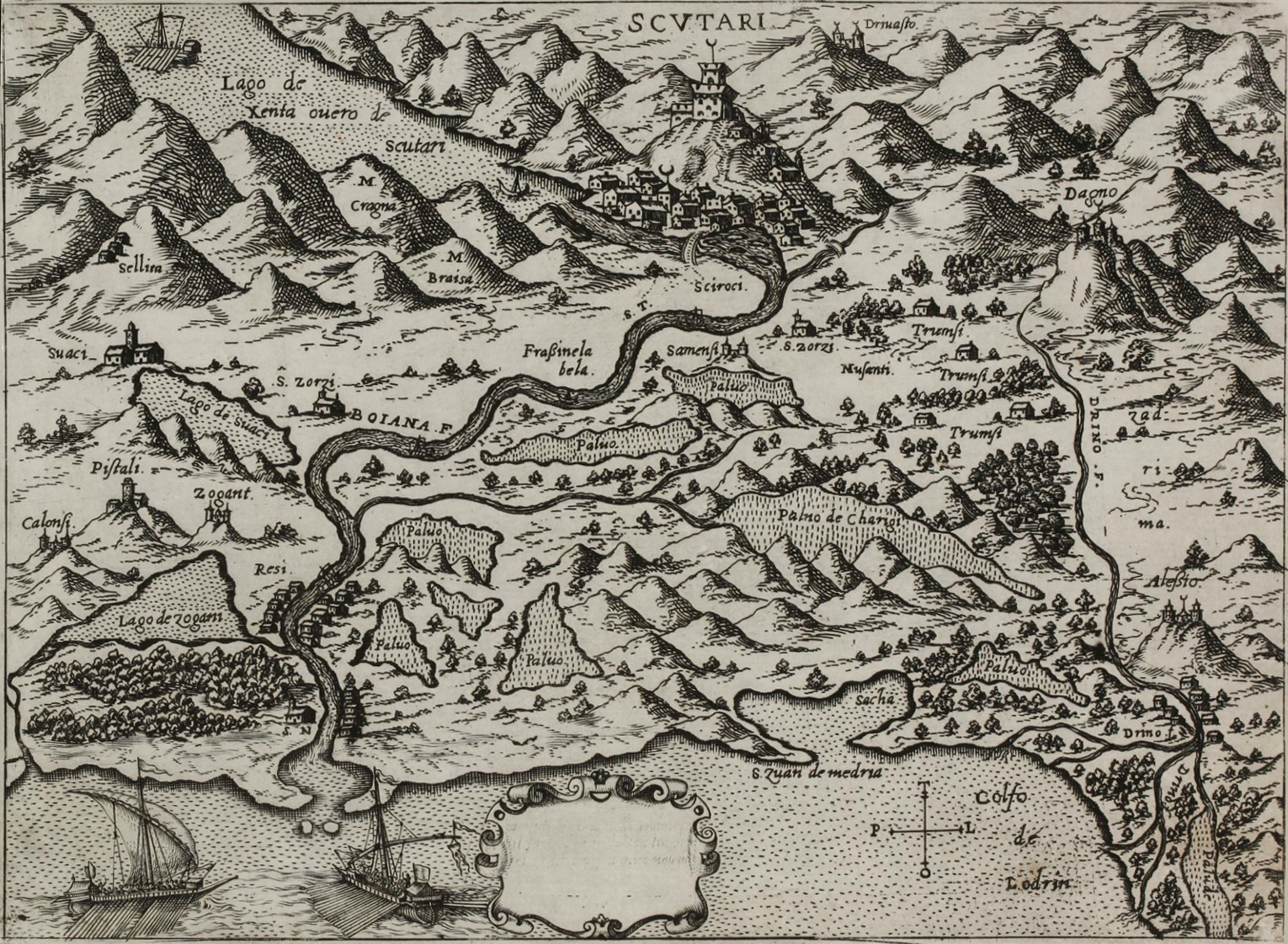
M. Kragna, 1571

Location of Skadarska Krajina/Kraja

The region within Montenegro is located from the eastern border with Albania near the coast of the Adriatic Sea. It is located between Crmnica and Ana Malit regions and stretches out from Skje village to Šestani, a sub-region often considered as forming part of wider region of Kraja. It is also between Skadar Lake and the Rumija mountain. Within Montenegro, it mainly consists of villages and small hamlets with Ostros being its most populated settlement (Pop. 230 (2003)). Within Albania, the region of Kraja is bordered on the southern flank by the Tarabosh mountains and only encompasses the coastal village of Zogaj on Lake Skadar.

Within Montenegro, Kraja encompasses some of the following villages and hamlets:

- Arbneš / Arbnesh
- Bobovište / Bobosht
- Blaca / Blac
- Ckla / Skje
- Kostanjica / Kështenjë
- Runja / Runj
- Mali Ostros / Ostros i Voqël
- Martići / Martiq
- Tejani / Ftjan
- Veliki Ostros / Ostrosi i Madh

== History ==
=== Ottoman period ===
In the Ottoman defter of 1485 for the Sanjak of Scutari, the nahiyah of Krajna is recorded with a single village of the same name. In the register, Krajna appears as a large settlement with 142 households, and around half of the household heads recorded bore typical Albanian personal names, the other half bearing Slavic anthroponymy possibly attributed to the influence of the Serbian Orthodox Church through the Patriarchate of Peć. In the later register of 1582, the nahiyah had expanded and came to encompass the settlements of Gjonçiq, Ftilan, Pençan, Brisk, Livar, Zogan, Arbanas, Bespod, Babsul, Roviq, Boboshta, Shkllav, Vrajsha, Nadvila, Podgozhan, Muriq, and Koshtanja. The first 11 villages attested predominantly bore Albanian anthroponyms, while the proceeding 4 primarily had Slavic or mixed Albanian-Slavic personal names. Muriq and Koshtanja, however, had a roughly equal number of Albanian and Slavic names.

== Demographics ==
From the late 1960s to the early 1970s, thousands of locals emigrated to Western Europe and the United States. Between 2,000 and 3,000 people are estimated to live in the Krajina region, with a majority of ethnic Albanians. The religious make-up is Muslim and Christian (Eastern Orthodox and Roman Catholic).

Krajë according to censuses
Village name		Population								
Montenegrin	Albanian	1948	1953	1961	1971	1981	1991	2003	2011	Ethnicity
Arbnež	Arbënesh	535	556	603	606	650	725	399	327	97.2% Albanians, 2.8% Others
Bobovište	Bobosht	318	354	412	470	490	553	230	180	100% Albanians
Ckla	Skje	179	193	243	285	291	301	104	83	100% Albanians
Koštanjica	Kështenjë	402	517	551	564	609	510	216	168	100% Albanians
Mali Ostros	Ostros i Vogël	323	358	394	384	427	419	148	111	100% Albanians
Martići	Martiq	521	530	564	641	682	705	357	293	97.6% Albanians, 2.4% undeclared
Tejani	Ftjan	305	288	292	261	185	240	93	61	100% Albanians
Veliki Ostros	Ostros i Madh	601	575	611	638	639	623	416	332	100% Albanians
Total		3184	3371	3670	3849	3973	4076	1963	1555	99% Albanians, 1% Others/Undeclared

Christians mostly reside in the Šestani region, with minorities in Livari, Briska and Tejani.

== See also ==
- Albanians in Montenegro
- Hotski Hum
- Lower Zeta

== Sources ==
- Pregled geografske literature o Balkanskom poluostrvu za ...: Revue de la littérature géographique de la péninsule Balkanique. Državna štamparija kraljevine Srbije. 1895.
- Andrija Jovićević (1999). Zeta i Lješkopolje, Skadarsko jezero. CID. ISBN 9788649500907.
- Nikola Damjanović (1974). Virpazar, Bar, Ulcinj. Obod.
- Pleme Šestani: istorijsko-etnografska studija. Udruženje građana "Šestani". 2006. ISBN 978-86-908693-0-5.
