= Koštanjica =

Koštanjica Коштањица Kështenjë
- Village
- Location within Montenegro
- Coordinates: 42.089668°N 19.279349°E
- Country: Montenegro
- Municipality: Bar

Population (2011)
  - Total: 168
- Time zone: UTC+1 (CET)
  - Summer (DST): UTC+2 (CEST)

Koštanjica (Cyrillic: Коштањица; Albanian: Kështenjë) is a village in the municipality of Bar, Montenegro. It is located in the Skadarska Krajina region, by Lake Skadar.

== Demographics ==
According to the 2011 census, its population was 168.

Ethnicity in 2011
Ethnicity	Number	Percentage
Albanians	165	98.2%
other/undeclared	3	1.8%
Total	168	100%
