= May 22 (Eastern Orthodox liturgics) =

Day in the Eastern Orthodox liturgical calendar

Eastern Orthodox liturgical calendar
May 21	May 22	May 23
May 22 O.S. ≍ June 4 N.S. May 22 N.S ≍ May 9 O.S.

An Eastern Orthodox cross

May 22 in Eastern Orthodox liturgical calendars is a feast day and a day of commemoration of saints and martyrs. Although some Orthodox churches use the Revised Julian Calendar and others use the traditional Julian calendar, the fixed commemorations for their respective May 22 are broadly the same, no matter which calendar is used. (Note: Despite the dates being the same, the days to which they refer typically differ by 13 days. The notation Old Style or O.S. is sometimes used to indicate a date in the traditional Julian Calendar (the "Old Calendar"). The notation New Style or N.S. indicates a date in the Revised Julian calendar (the "New Calendar").)

== Feasts ==
- Commemoration of the Holy Fathers of the Second Ecumenical Council (381)

== Saints ==
- Righteous Melchizedek, King of Salem (ancient Jerusalem) (c. 2000 BC) (Note: Melchisedek was a contemporary of our forefather Abraham. According to the words of the Apostle Paul he was a king, priest and proto-type of the Lord Jesus Christ (Hebrews 7). He is also commemorated on the Sunday before the Nativity of the Lord (i.e. the Sunday of the Holy Fathers), which falls between December 18 and December 24 each year.)
- Martyr Sophia the Healer, a physician, by beheading.
- Martyr Marcellus, by being placed in molten lead.
- Martyr Codratus (Quadratus), by being dragged by horses. (see also: March 10)
- Martyr Basiliscus of Comana (c. 308) (see also: March 3)
- Hieromartyrs Donatus, Bishop of Thmuis, the priest Macarius, and the deacon Theodore (c. 316) (Note: Saint Donatus was the successor of the also martyred St. Phileas as Bishop of Thmuis, a city of Lower Egypt in the Roman province Augustamnica Prima, suffragan of Pelusium.)
- Saint John Vladimir, King of Serbia, Martyr, Wonderworker, whose relics are at Elbasan (1015)

== Pre-Schism Western saints ==
- Saint Ausonius, first Bishop of Angoulême (1st or 3rd century) (Note: The first Bishop of Angoulême was Ausonius, a disciple, it is said, of St. Martial, concerning whom we have two historical authorities: St. Gregory of Tours, who held that St. Martial preached the gospel in Limoges about the year 250, and the Limousin traditions, transmitted or invented by the chronicler Adhémar de Chabannes, who maintained that St. Martial was the immediate disciple of St. Peter.; According to the latter opinion St. Ausonius was a bishop of the 1st century; according to the former, of the 3rd century.)
- Saint Marcian of Ravenna, Bishop and Confessor (c. 127) (Note: Some people have argued that he is the same person as Marcian of Tortona (c. 120).)
- Martyrs Castus and Emilius, by fire, in Carthage (250)
- Martyrs Timothy, Faustinus and Venustus, in Rome, under Julian the Apostate (362)
- Saint Helen of Caernarfon (Elen Luyddog, lit. "Helen of the Hosts"), daughter of a Romano-British ruler, wife of Emperor Magnus Maximus, and a founder of churches in Wales (late 4th-century) (Note: Saint Gregory of Tours and Sulpicius Severus record that Maximus and his wife met Saint Martin of Tours while they were in Gaul. Together with her sons, Cystennin (Constantine) and Peblig (Publicus), she is said to have introduced into Wales the Celtic form of monasticism from Gaul. "Legend has it that after the defeat and death of her husband in 388 Helena returned to Wales and was regarded there as a saint...As St. Elen, Helena has several churches dedicated to her in Wales. Among others we find Llanelen in Monmouthshire; Llanelen near Llanrhidian in west Gower; Bletherston church in Pembrokeshire is dedicated to her, and there was formerly a Capel Elen in the parish of Penrhosllugwy in Anglesey." She is said to have ordered the making of Sarn Helen, the great Roman road running from Caernarfon to South Wales. She is acknowledged as the patron saint of British roadbuilders and the protectress of travellers.)
- Saint Helen of Auxerre (c. 418) (Note: St. Helen of Auxerre is mentioned in the writings of Saint Agapetos (Amator), bishop of Auxerre (418) (May 1). She was the one who looked after him when he was ill.)
- Saint Julia of Corsica the martyr, who was crucified (440)
- Saint Quiteria the virgin-martyr, in Spain (5th century)
- Saint Romanus of Subiaco (Romanus of Auxerre), ascetic who ministered to Saint Benedict of Nursia (560)
- Saint Fulk (c. 600)
- Saint Boethian of Pierrepont (near Laon), Irish, Benedictine monk, martyred in France (7th century)
- Saint Conall (Conald, Coel), of Inniskeel (Inniscoel, Innis-coel), County Donegal, Abbot of the island monastery of Inniskeel (7th century)
- Saint John of Parma, abbot of Saint John's at Parma from 973 to c. 982, then under Cluniac observance (c. 982) (Note: John was born in Parma, Italy, and early in life was made a canon of the cathedral there. He is said to have taken the Benedictine habit in the Holy Land.)
- Saint Bobo (Beuvon), hermit (c. 985)

== Post-Schism Orthodox saints ==
- Saint Kali of Asia Minor (c. 14th century) (Note: Also commemorated on May 15, and the Saturday of Bright Week.)
- New Hieromartyr Zachariah, priest of Prussa (1802)
- Blessed James, youth, of Borovichi, Novgorod, Wonderworker (1540) (Note: The Translation of his sacred relics is observed on October 23.) (Note: See: (in Russian) Иаков Боровичский. Википедии. (Russian Wikipedia).)
- New Martyr Demetrios of Peloponnesos (1803) (see also: April 14)
- Venerable Monk-martyr Paul of Mt. Athos, at Tripolis, Peloponnesus (1818)

=== New martyrs and confessors ===
- Saint Innocent (Yastrebov), Archbishop of Astrakhan, Confessor (1928) (Note: See: (in Russian) Иннокентий (Ястребов). Википедии. (Russian Wikipedia).)
- New Hieromartyr Maxim (Zhizhilenko), Bishop of Serpukhov (1931) (Note: See: (in Russian) Максим (Жижиленко). Википедии. (Russian Wikipedia).)
- New Hieromartyr Michael Borisov, Archpriest, of Uglich (1942)

== Other commemorations ==
- Synaxis of the Cyprus Icon ("Sophianois" Icon) of the Most Holy Mother of God. (Note: Also commemorated on the Sunday of Orthodoxy, Pentecost Monday, April 20 and July 9.)
- "Surety of Sinners" Icon of the Most Holy Theotokos, Korets (1622)
- Repose of Cleopas of Valaam, disciple of Saint Paisius Velichkovsky (1816)
- Repose of Eldress Macrina of Volos (Macrina of Portaria) (1995)

== Icon gallery ==
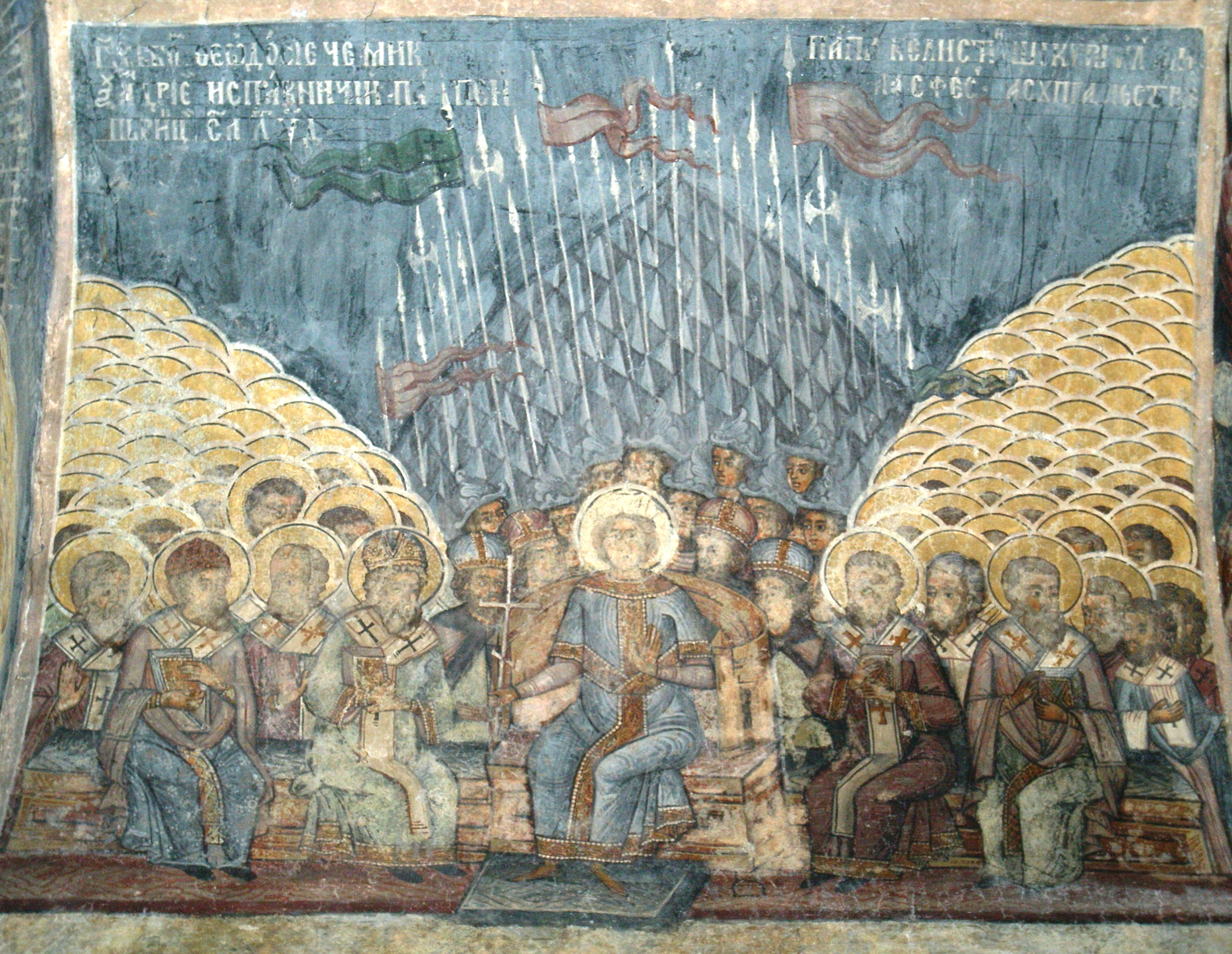
The First Council of Constantinople (381), wall painting at the church of Stavropoleos, Bucharest, Romania.

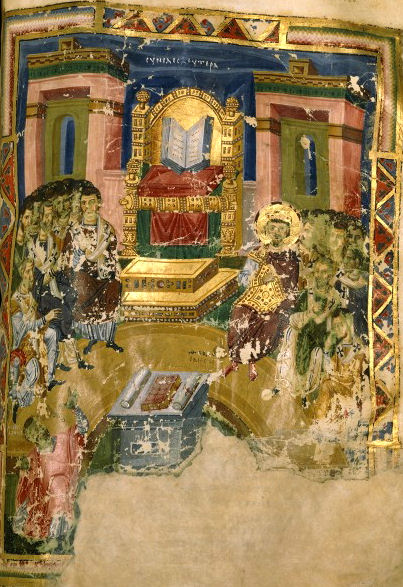
First Ecumenical Council of Constantinople (381).

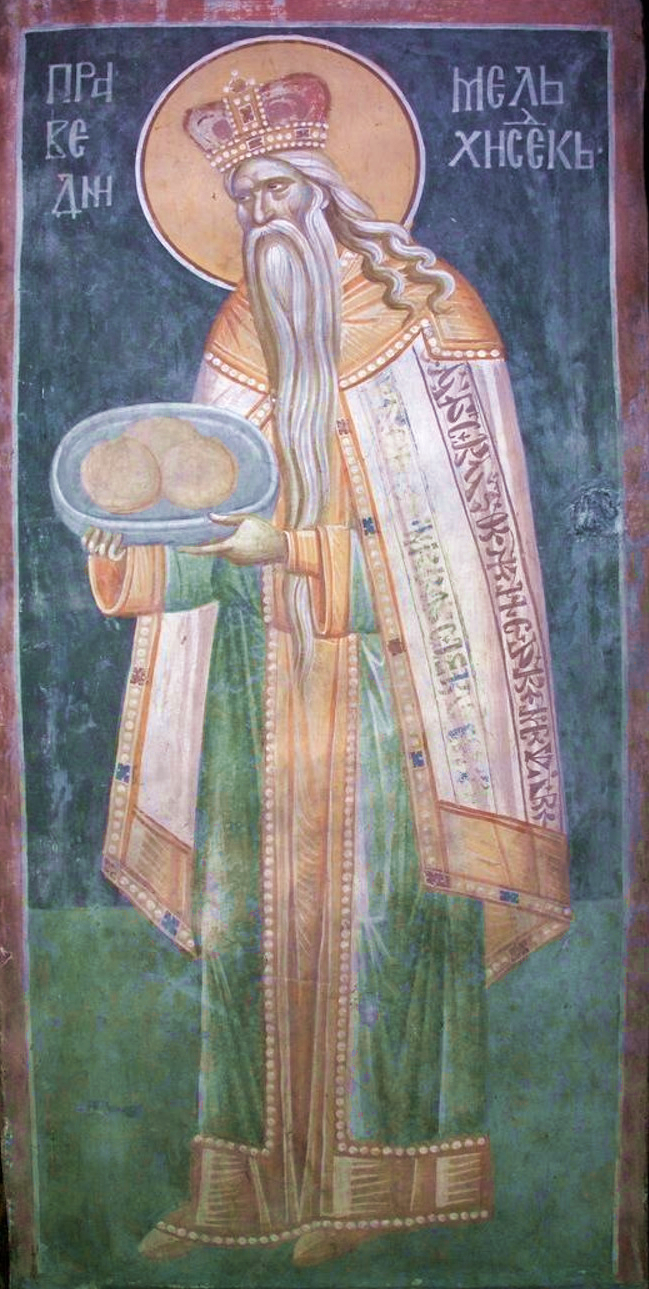
Righteous Melchizedek, King of Salem.

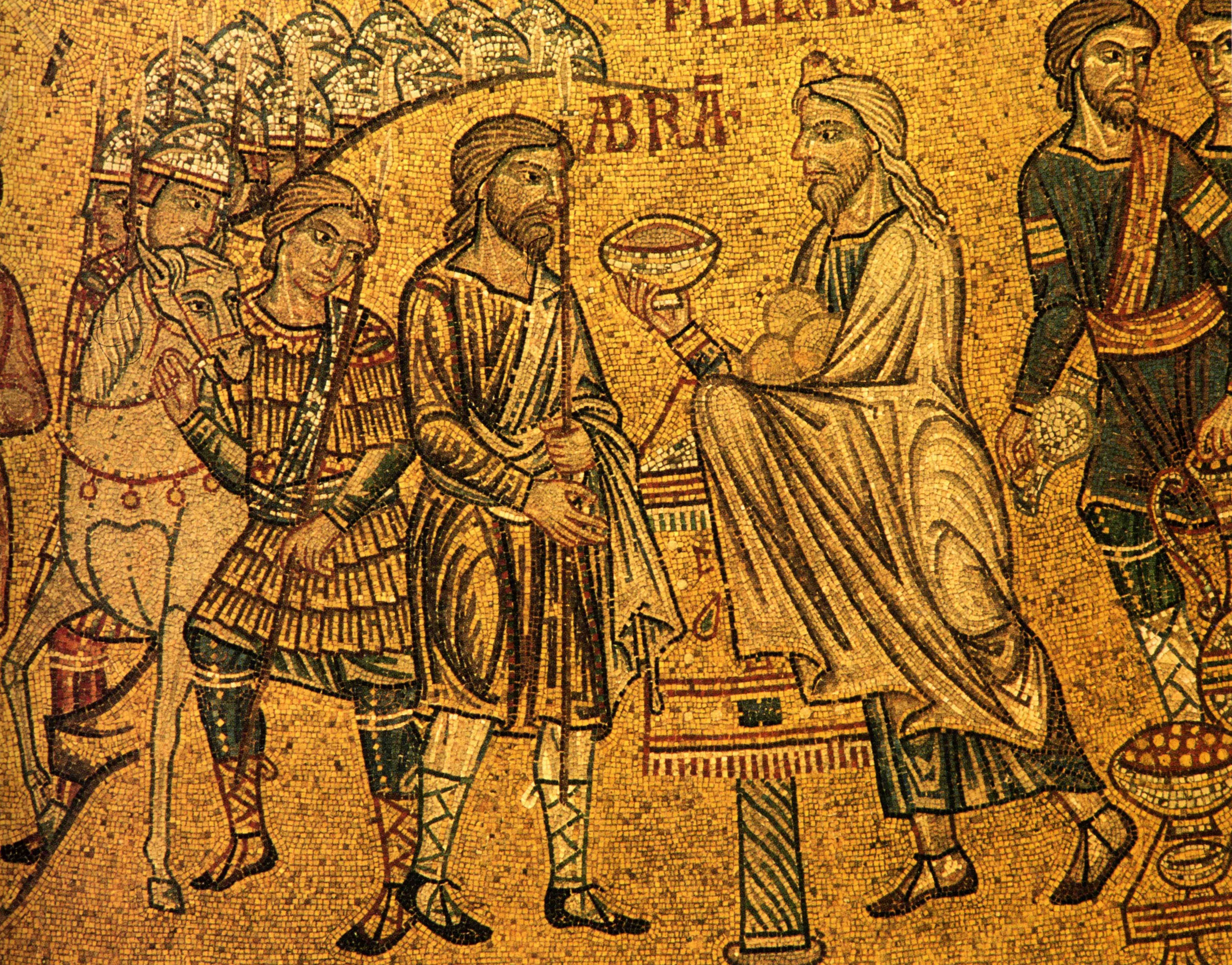
Abraham meets Melchisedech (Mosaic in Basilica di San Marco).

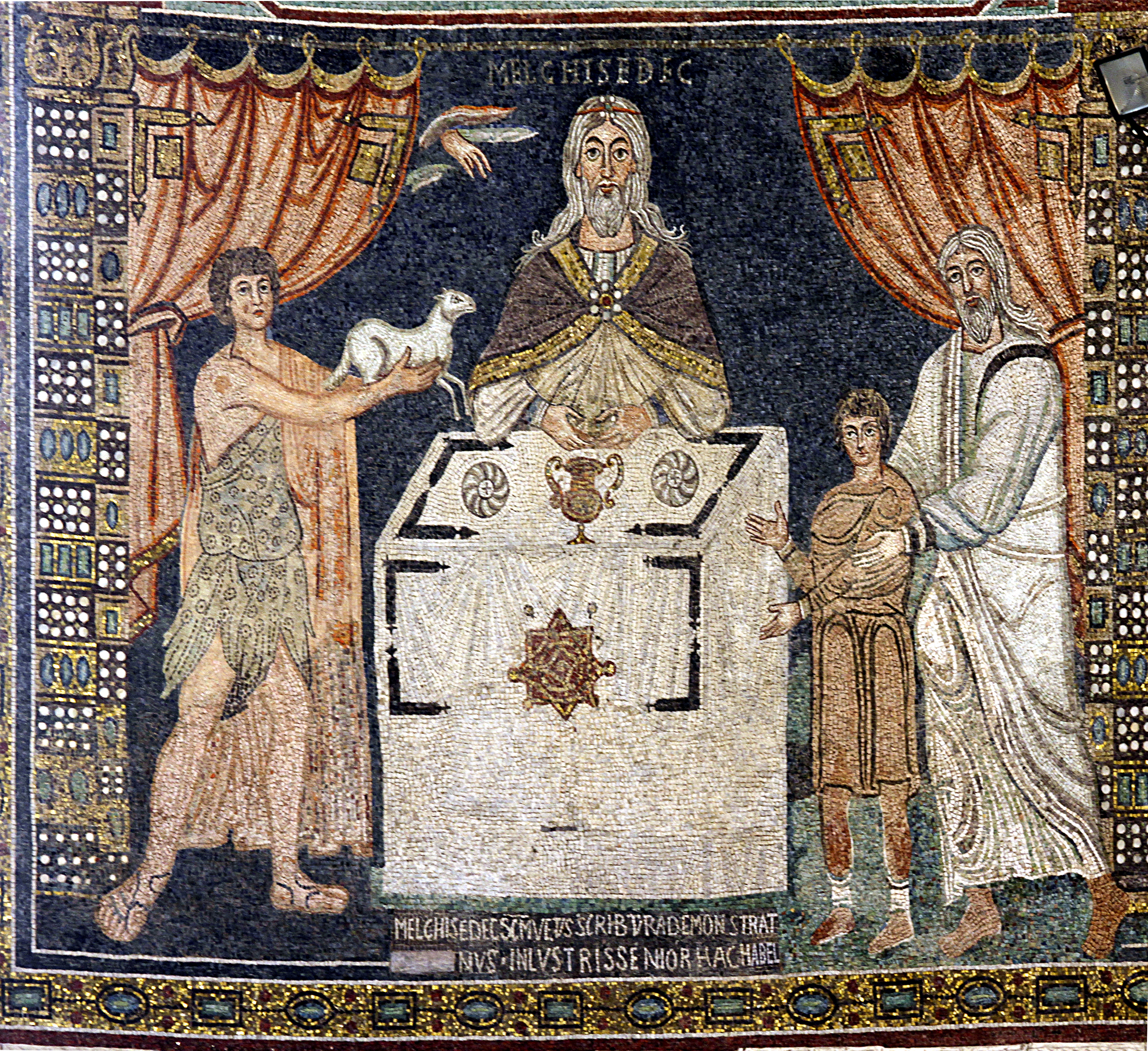
Mosaic of Melchisedech, Abraham and Abel (Ravenna - Basilica of Sant'Apollinare in Classe).

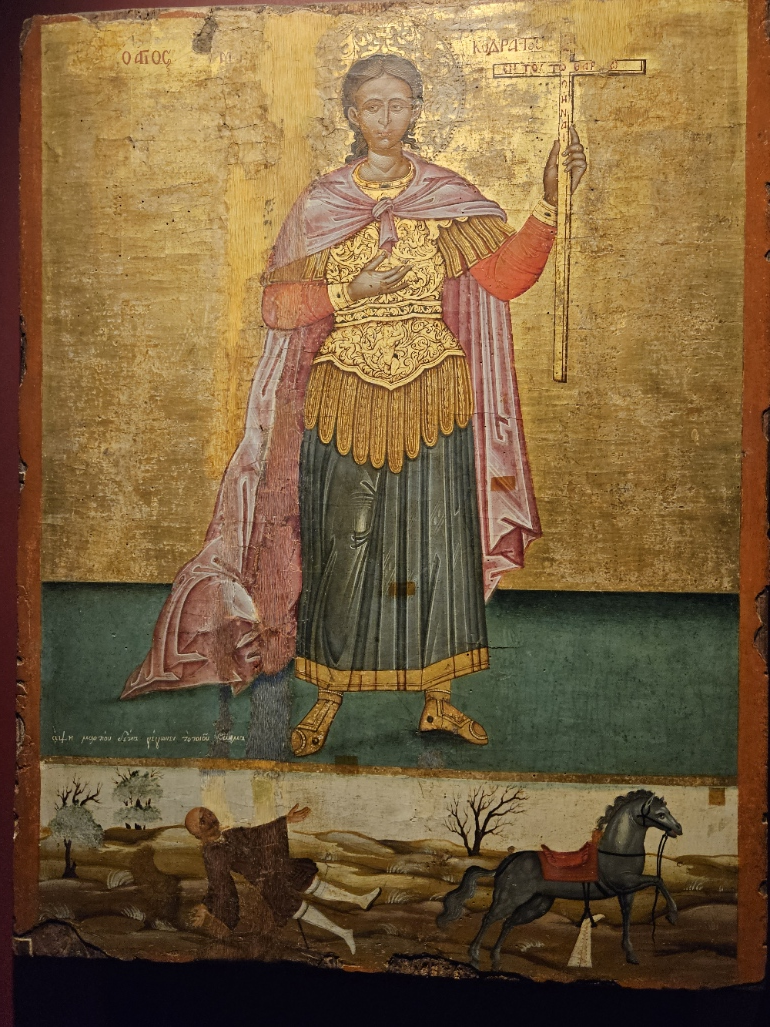
Martyr Codratus (Quadratus).

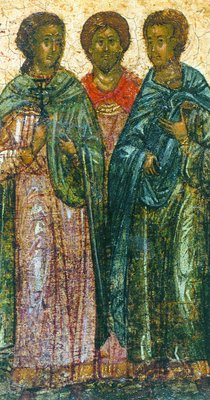
Martyrs Eutropius, Cleonicus, and Basiliscus.

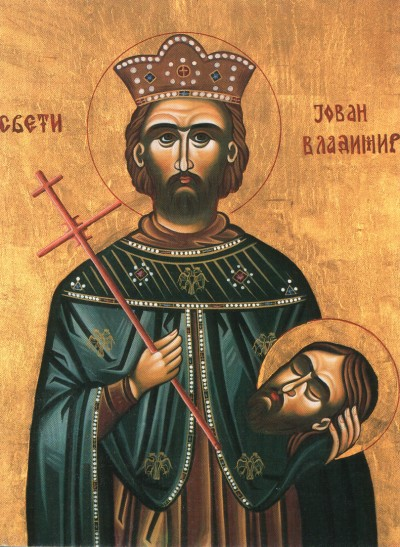
St. Jovan Vladimir.

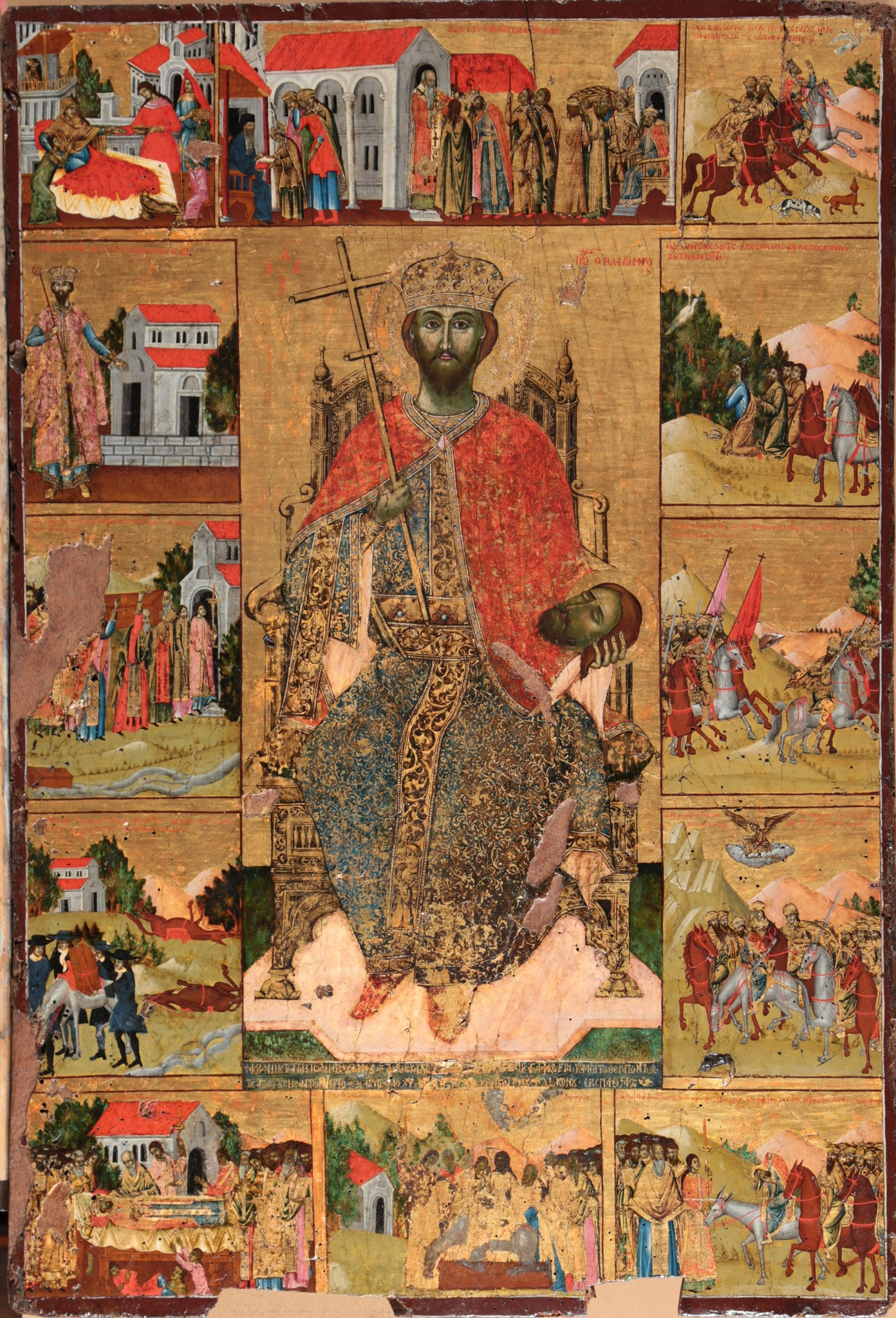
St. Jovan Vladimir, a 1739 icon from the Ardenica Monastery in Albania, was painted by Kostandin Shpataraku.

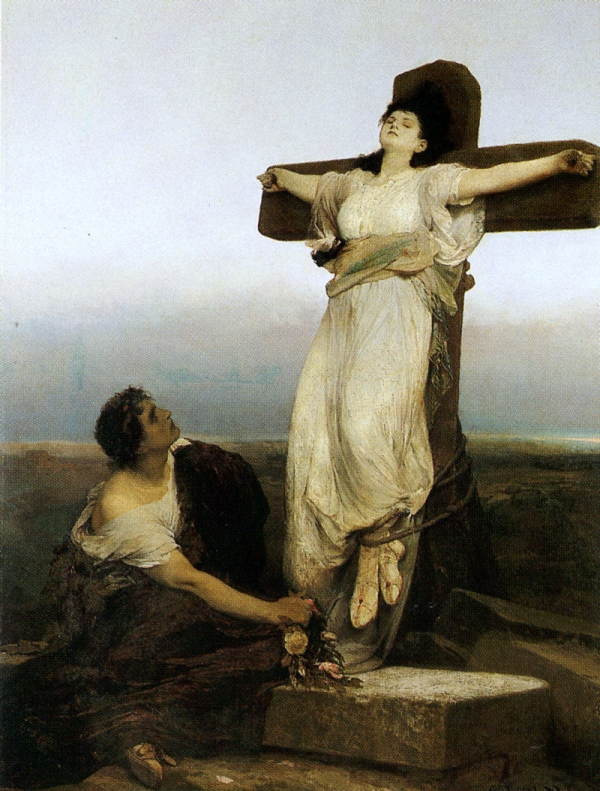
St. Julia of Corsica.

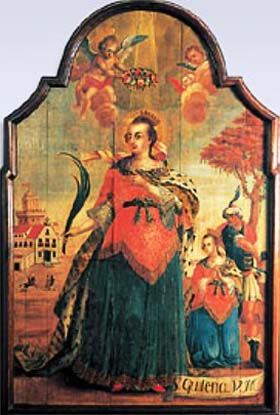
Virgin Martyr St. Quiteria.

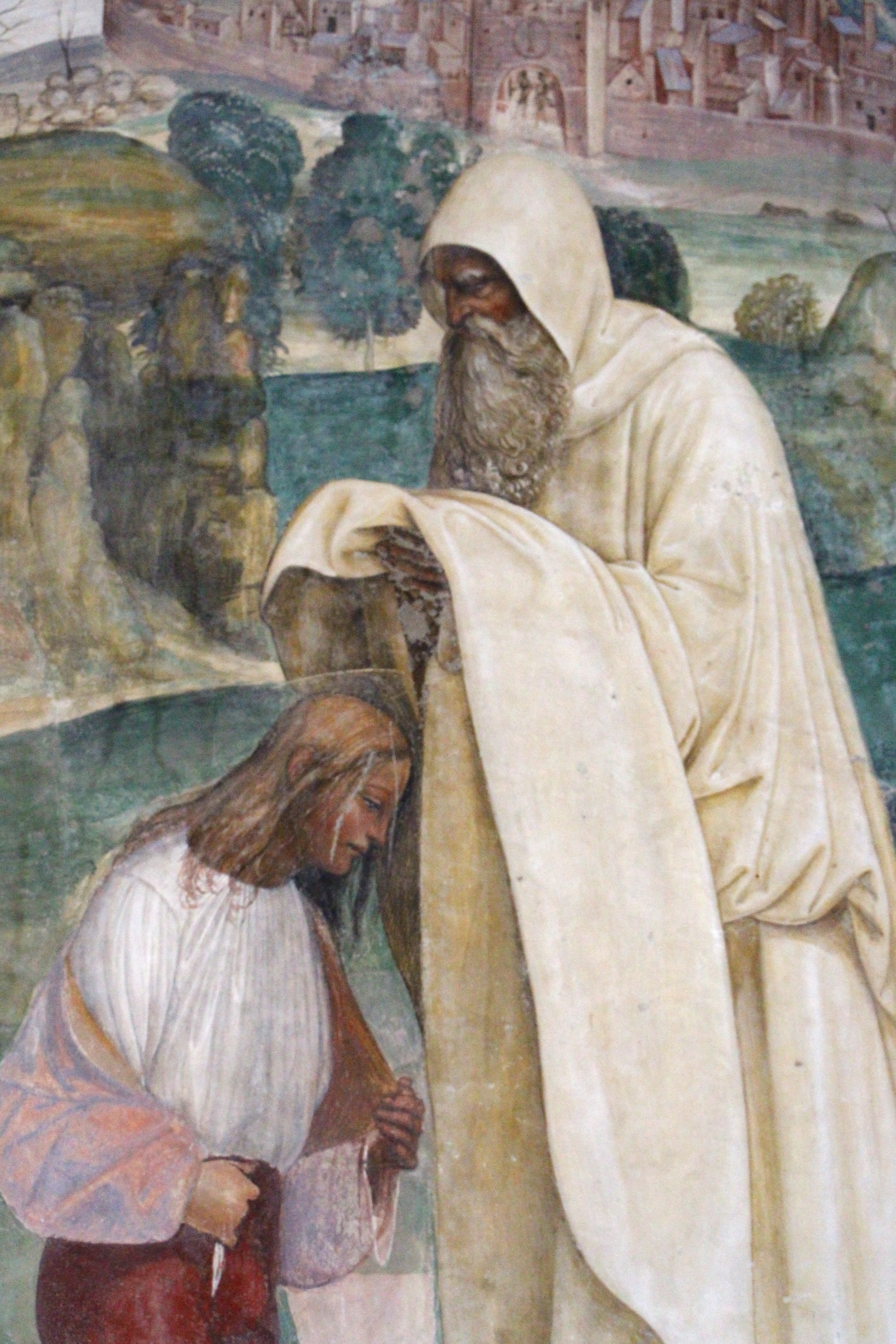
Life of St Benedict, Scene 4: The Monk Romanus Dresses Benedict.

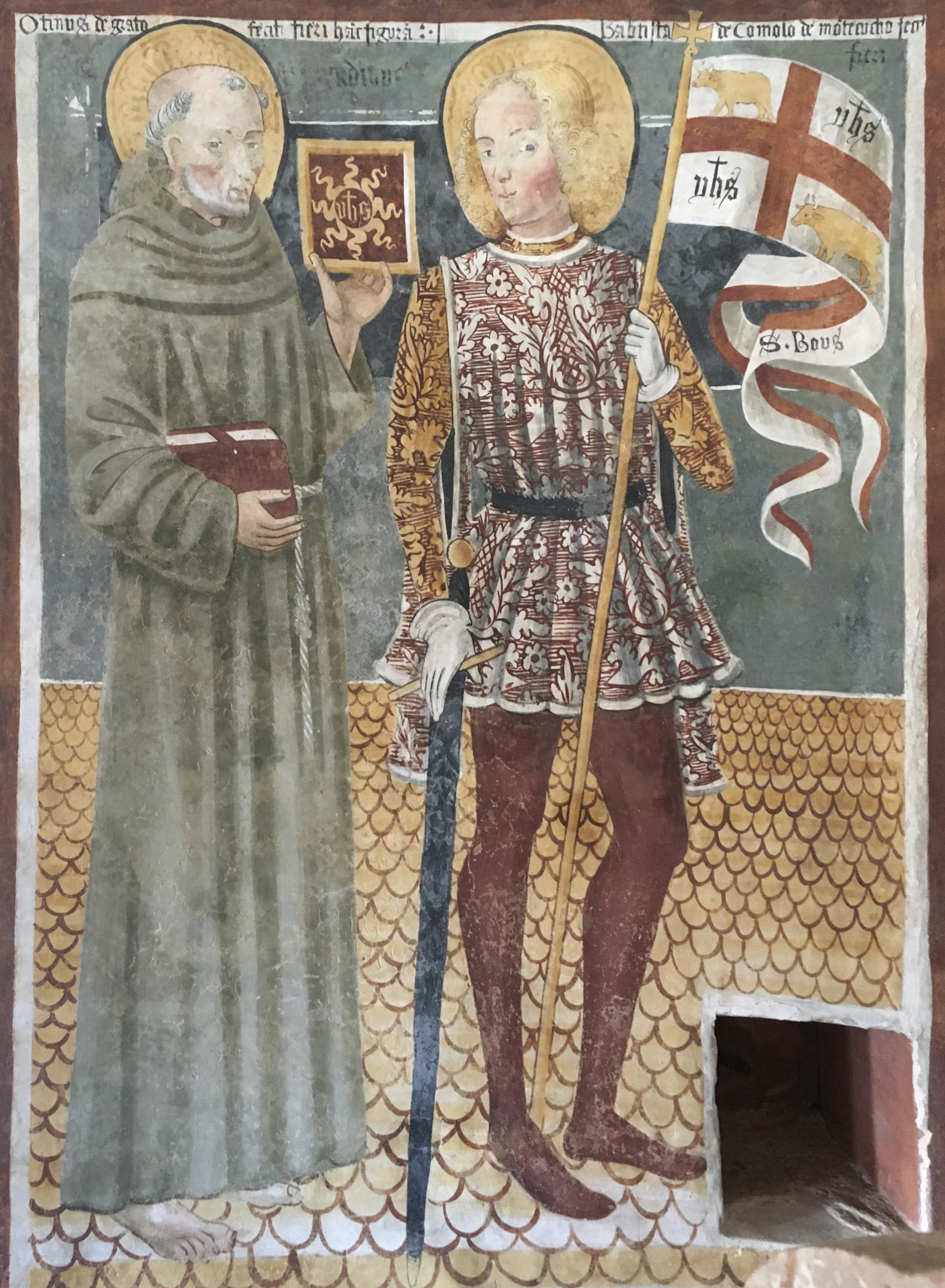
St. Bobo of Provence.

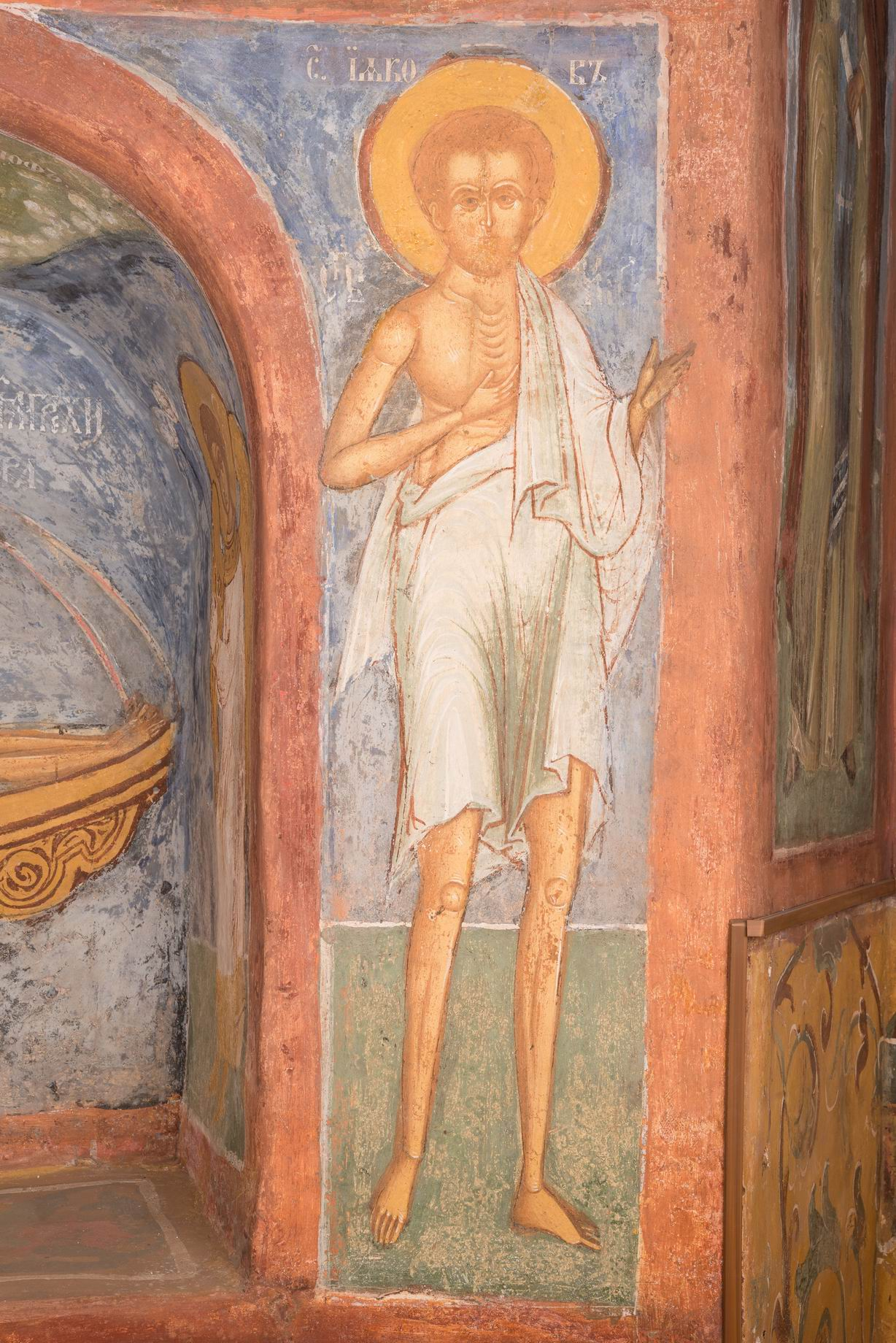
Blessed James, youth, of Borovichi, Novgorod, Wonderworker.

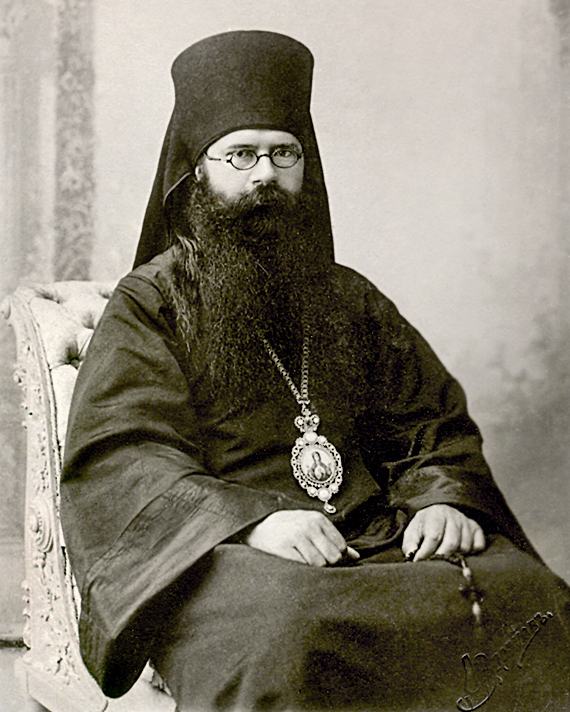
St. Innocent (Yastrebov), Archbishop of Astrakhan, Confessor.

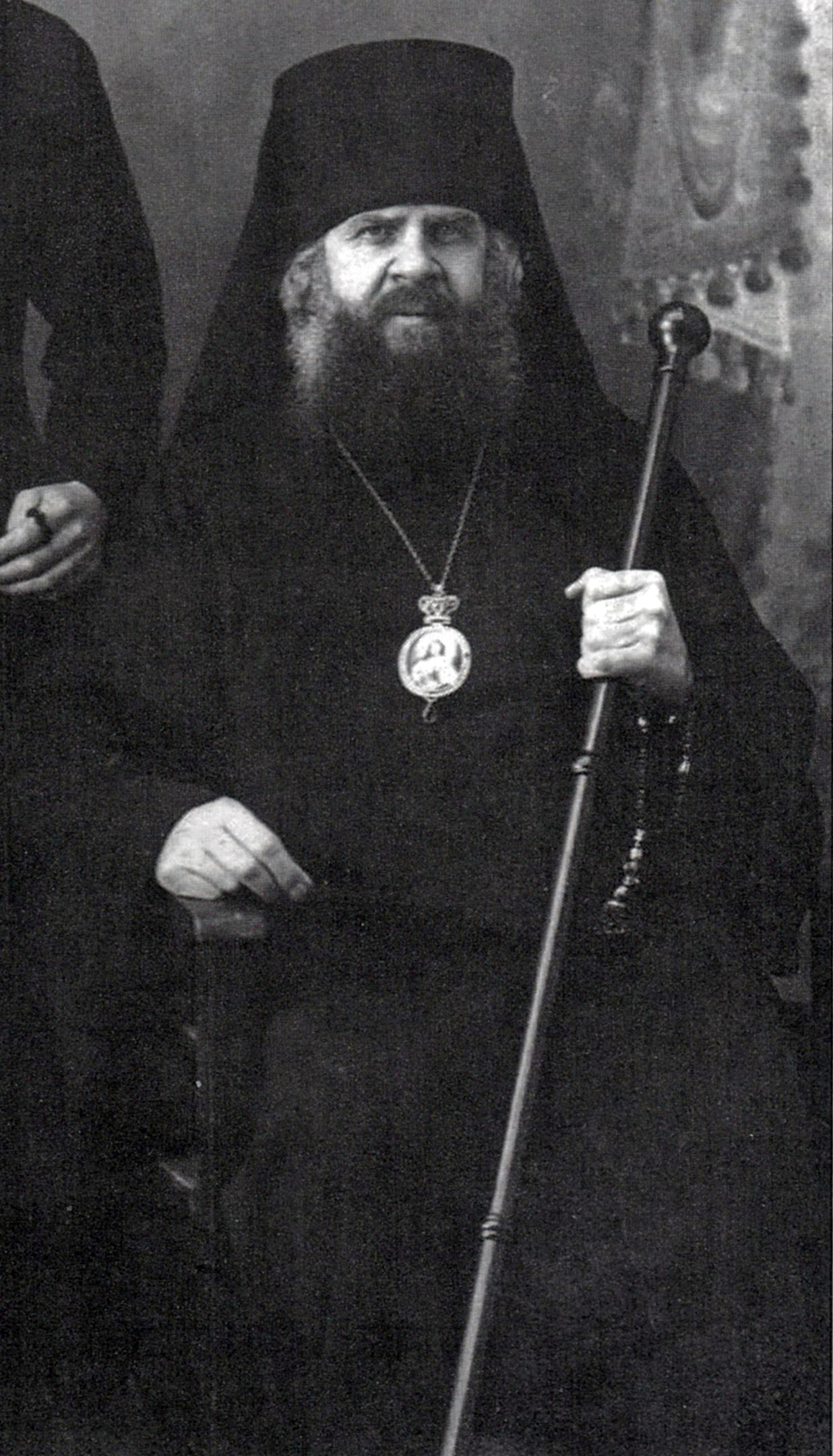
New Hieromartyr Maxim (Zhizhilenko), Bishop of Serpukhov.

== Sources ==
- May 22/June 4. Orthodox Calendar (ORTHOCHRISTIAN.COM).
- June 4 / May 22. HOLY TRINITY RUSSIAN ORTHODOX CHURCH(A parish of the Patriarchate of Moscow).
- May 22. OCA - The Lives of the Saints.
- May 22. Latin Saints of the Orthodox Patriarchate of Rome.
- May 22. The Roman Martyrology.

Greek Sources

- Great Synaxaristes: (in Greek) 22 ΜΑΪΟΥ. ΜΕΓΑΣ ΣΥΝΑΞΑΡΙΣΤΗΣ.
- (in Greek) Συναξαριστής. 22 Μαΐου. ECCLESIA.GR. (H ΕΚΚΛΗΣΙΑ ΤΗΣ ΕΛΛΑΔΟΣ).

Russian Sources

- (in Russian) 4 июня (22 мая). Православная Энциклопедия под редакцией Патриарха Московского и всея Руси Кирилла (электронная версия). (Orthodox Encyclopedia - Pravenc.ru).
- (in Russian) 22 мая (ст.ст.) 4 июня 2013 (нов. ст.). Русская Православная Церковь Отдел внешних церковных связей. (DECR).
