= Dragimir of Travunia and Zachlumia =

Dragimir
- Prince of Travunia and Zachlumia
- Reign: before 1000 – 1018
- Predecessor: Jovan Vladimir
- Successor: Stefan Vojislav
- Died: 1018; Kotor
- Issue: Stefan Vojislav
- Father: Hvalimir
- Religion: Eastern Orthodox Christian

Dragimir (Serbian Cyrillic: Драгимир; † 1018) or Dragomir (Драгомир) was ruler of Travunia and Zachlumia, medieval Serbian principalities located in present-day regions of Herzegovina and south Dalmatia, from an unknown date before 1000 to 1018.

== Biography ==
The only preserved medieval source that mentions Dragimir is the dubious Chronicle of the Priest of Duklja, specifically its Chapters 34–37. Chapter 34 relates to "King" Hvalimir who divided his domain among his sons, giving Zenta to his first-born Petrislav, Travunia and Zachlumia to Dragimir, and Podgoria to the youngest Miroslav.

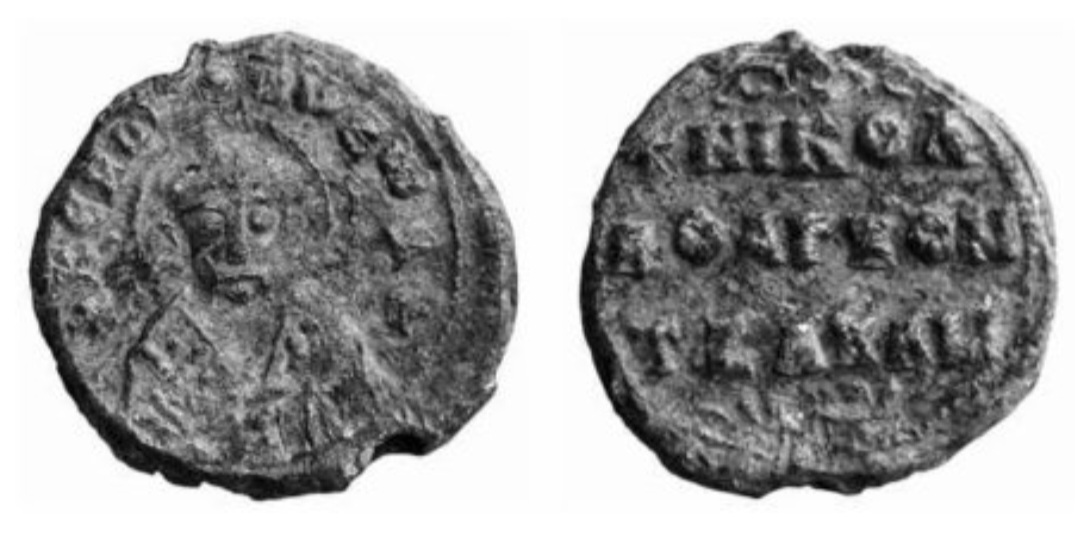
Seal of Archon Nikola of Zachlumia (Nikola may be the Christian name of Dragimir)

After Miroslav died without an heir, his land was taken over by Petrislav, who thus ruled all of Duklja (Zenta and Podgoria). However this is contradictory to the earlier and more trusted De Administrando Imperio which states that Hvalimir's son was Čučimir, leaving up to question whether Dragimir was Hvalimir's grandson, or whether he existed at all.

In 1009 or 1010, Bulgarian Emperor Samuel occupied Dragimir's lands, together with Duklja, Bosnia, and Raška. Dragimir retreated before the emperor's army on a mountain, but was soon invited by Samuel to come down and resume ruling Travunia and Zachlumia as his vassal. The emperor had previously made a similar arrangement in Duklja with Jovan Vladimir, son and successor of Petrislav. Vladimir was killed in 1016 by Samuel's son's successor Ivan Vladislav who was killed at the end of 1017.

In the first half of 1018, Dragimir set off for Duklja accompanied by his soldiers to establish himself as its ruler, since his nephew Vladimir died without an heir. When he came to Kotor, the town's inhabitants prepared a banquet for him on a small island in the Bay of Kotor. Dragimir went there with only a handful of his men, who could not defend him against the Kotorans who had actually decided to kill him. He ran away into a church, but the Kotorans opened its roof and killed him by throwing beams and stones at him. After that, his soldiers returned to Travunia.

Dragimir had a son, Stefan Vojislav, who would become ruler of Duklja in the 1030s, and the founder of the Vojislavljević dynasty.
