= Martići =

Martići Мартићи Martiq
- Village
- Location within Montenegro
- Coordinates: 42.091920°N 19.297553°E
- Country: Montenegro
- Municipality: Bar

Population (2011)
  - Total: 293
- Time zone: UTC+1 (CET)
  - Summer (DST): UTC+2 (CEST)

Martići (Cyrillic: Мартићи; Albanian: Martiq) is a village in the municipality of Bar, Montenegro. It is located in the Skadarska Krajina region, by Lake Skadar.

== Demographics ==
According to the 2011 census, its population was 293.

Ethnicity in 2011
Ethnicity	Number	Percentage
Albanians	286	97.6%
other/undeclared	7	2.4%
Total	293	100%
