= Peter of Diokleia =

Petrislav Hvalimirović Петар Хвалимировић
- Prince of Dioclea
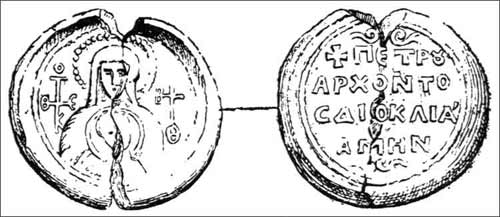
- The seal of Petar of Dioclea, found in the 19th century. It says, "Peter, archon of Diokleia, Amen".
- Reign: 10th century – 998
- Successor: Vladimir
- Born: 10th century
- Died: 998
- Issue: Vladimir

Peter of Diokleia, (Note: Also known as Petrislav (Serbian: Петрислав, Petrislav) or Petar (Serbian: Петaр, Petar)) Petrislav, or potentially Petrislav Hvalimirović was an archon of Duklja in the late 10th century.

== Biography ==
The history of Duklja until the 10th century is little known. A list of mythological rulers of this time exists in the historically dubious Chronicle of the Priest of Duklja, compiled in the 13th century or even the 16th and 17th centuries. In this chronicle, the father of Prince Jovan Vladimir (ruled c. 1000 – 1016) is named Petrislav, possibly meaning that Peter and Petrislav are the same.

It's mentioned in the historically dubious Chronicle of the Priest of Duklja that Petrislav is a descendant of the Trebinje Prince Hvalimir, Petar's potential predecessor who came from the Travunian dynasty and was given Duklja to rule as part of Hvalimir's domain.

== Seal ==
The only information on him is from a seal found in the 19th century, which is decorated on the obverse with a bust of the Virgin Mary holding a medallion of Christ and flanked by two cruciform invocative monograms. The text is in Greek letters, saying ΠΕΤΡ[Ο]Υ ΑΡΧΟΝΤΟΣ ΔΙΟΚΛ[Ε]ΙΑ[Σ] ΑΜΗΝ (Petr[o]u, Archontos Diokl[e]ias, Amen), i.e., "[Seal] of Peter, archon of Duklja, Amen". The seal shows that although Duklja underwent turmoil in the 9th century, the region still continued under Byzantine rule or, at least, cultural influence.

The stamp was kept in the Medal cabinet of Berlin, and before 1884 it was in a decayed condition. Illustration based on the original by Léon Dardel, was first published in 1884 by Gustave Schlumberger.

== Chronicle of the Priest of Duklja ==
The Chronicle of the Priest of Dioclea or Duklja (Serbo-Croatian: Ljetopis popa Dukljanina, Љетопис попа Дукљанина; Latin: Gesta regum Sclavorum) is the usual name given to a medieval chronicle written in two versions between 1295 and 1301 by Rudger (or Rüdiger), who was an ecclesiastic from Duklja and the archbishop of Bar, as well as being a part of the Cistercian Order and potentially being of Czech origin. The disputed writer of the document was Bishop Grgur Barski ("Gregory of Bar"). Two chapters of the chronicle are dedicated to Petrislav.

The chronicle states that after the death of King Tuđemir, a king whose existence is uncertain due to the unreliability of the chronicle, he was succeeded by his son, Hvalimir, who had three sons: Petrislav, Dragimir, and Miroslav. Petrislav ruled over the region of Zeta. Dragimir, the future potential successor of Jovan Vladimir, presided over Travunija and Hum. Miroslav ruled the Podgorje region. (Note: Podgorje (Latin: Podgoria or Submontana) is the historiographical name for a Serbian medieval region that, according to the Chronicle of the Priest of Dukljan, extended in the immediate hinterland of Duklja, Travunija and Zahumlje, stretching from the parish of Morača in the southeast to the parish of Rama in the northwest, thus occupying a specific position between the Serbian coastal and Zagorje regions.)

After King Tuđemir died, he was succeeded as king by his son Hvalimir, who took a wife with whom he had three sons. The firstborn was named Petrislav, who ruled the Zeta region; the second Dragimir, who ruled Travunija and Hum; the third Miroslav, who ruled the Podgorje region. Having left the land to his sons, he died in old age. —Chronicle of the Priest of Duklja, Chapter XXXIV.

Petrislav's youngest brother, Miroslav, while trying to visit his older brother, would later die in a storm that arose nearby after sailing through a place called Blato, which is presumed to be Lake Skadar, a lake bisected by the modern borders between Montenegro and Albania. After Miroslav's death, Petrislav would end up inheriting the territory. Shortly after, Petrislav had a son, Saint Jovan Vladimir, who would end up being his successor and the future ruler of Duklja. The chronicle states that Petrislav was entombed in the church of St. Maria in Krajina; before correction, the place was dubbed as Gazeni.

Once Miroslav, having come to see his older brother, got into a boat and while he was sailing through Balta, suddenly a storm arose in which he and those who were with him perished. His country was owned by his brother and he ruled it in his stead. Then King Petrislav sired a son whom he named Vladimir, and died in peace. He was buried in the Church of St. Mary, in a place called Krajina. —Chronicle of the Priest of Duklja, Chapter XXXV.

It's necessary to mention that the Chronicle of the Priest of Duklja is a notoriously unreliable historical document. It contains some semi-mythical material on the early history of the Western South Slavs, alongside historical inaccuracies, unsupported claims, and inconsistent genealogies being found in the said chronicle. Petrislav, along with many other potentially mythologized royal historical figures of Duklja before his reign—who are dubiously considered as his ancestors—holds the title of a king rather than an archon.

== Sources ==
- McGeer, Eric; Nesbitt, John; Oikonomides, Nicolas, eds. (2005). Catalogue of Byzantine Seals at Dumbarton Oaks and in the Fogg Museum of Art, Volume 5: The East (continued), Constantinople and Environs, Unknown Locations, Addenda, Uncertain Readings. Vol. 5. Washington, DC: Dumbarton Oaks Research Library and Collection. ISBN 0-88402-309-5.
- Živković, Tibor (2006). Портрети српских владара (IX-XII) (in Serbian). Belgrade: Zavod za udžbenike. ISBN 86-17-13754-1.
