= Arbnež =

Arbnež Арбнеж Arbënesh
- Village
- Location within Montenegro
- Coordinates: 42°04′31″N 19°20′25″E
- Country: Montenegro
- Municipality: Bar

Population (2011)
  - Total: 327
- Time zone: UTC+1 (CET)
  - Summer (DST): UTC+2 (CEST)

Arbnež (Serbian Cyrillic: Арбнеж; Albanian: Arbënesh), also known as Arbneš, is a village in the Bar municipality in southern Montenegro. It is located in the Skadarska Krajina region, by Lake Skadar.

== Demographics ==
According to the 2011 census, its population was 327.

Ethnicity in 2011
Ethnicity	Number	Percentage
Albanians	318	97.2%
other/undeclared	9	2.8%
Total	327	100%
