= Mali Ostros =

Mali Ostros Мали Острос Ostros i Voqël
- Village
- Location within Montenegro
- Coordinates: 42.086935°N 19.310376°E
- Country: Montenegro
- Municipality: Bar

Population (2011)
  - Total: 111
- Time zone: UTC+1 (CET)
  - Summer (DST): UTC+2 (CEST)

Mali Ostros (Serbian Cyrillic: Мали Острос; Albanian: Ostros i Vogël) is a village in the municipality of Bar, Montenegro. It is located in the Skadarska Krajina region, by Lake Skadar.

== Demographics ==
According to the 2011 census, its population was 111.

Ethnicity in 2011
Ethnicity	Number	Percentage
Albanians	110	99.1%
other/undeclared	1	0.9%
Total	111	100%
