= Ana Malit =

Region in southeastern Montenegro and northwestern Albania

Coordinates: 42°1′57.09″N 19°24′50.45″E

Map of Ana Malit region in Albania and Montenegro

Ana Malit (lit. 'Side of the Mountain' in Albanian) is a region in southeastern Montenegro and northwestern Albania. Ana Malit consist some villages, such as Vladimir, Kravari, Krytha, Kllezna, Milla, Lulaj, Shasi, Amulli, Gjonza, Dragina, Brajsha, Sukubina, Selita, Shtodra and Rashtisha. Šas hosts ancient church ruins and its old castle. The town of Krytha is next to Mount Suka. Sukubina is closer to the Albanian border than the other villages.

== Geography ==
The Ana Malit region is located between Lake Skadar and Lake Šas. It is divided by the Albania/Montenegro border (Ana e Malit is in Albania) and the Adriatic Sea.

In the north is Mount Lipoja and from the other side are the villages and region of Kraja with Ostros as center, which is also Albanian. In the south Anamalit's border goes across the Medjurecje River through Krytha, Kllezna, and up to Lake Shasi which belongs to Anamali, to the village of Saint George and the Albanian border. In the east is the Albanian/Montenegrin border and a large part of Anamalit continues up to the city of Scodra (Scutari).

It's villages include:

- Kravari
- Katerkolle
- Sukobin
- Krytha
- Bojku
- Kosiç
- Kalimani
- Kllezna
- Milla
- Lulaj
- Shasi
- Amulli
- Gjonza
- Dragina
- Brajsha
- Sukubina
- Selita
- Shtodra
- Zenelaj
- Rashtisha

== Demographics ==
The population of Ana Malit is predominantly Albanian.

Many of Ana Malit's natives started migrating to the nearest major city, Ulcinj. Since the 1960s many of the people of Ana Malit started emigrating to the United States, Germany, Australia and other parts of the world. The 2008 estimated population is near 11,000. An estimated 36,000 people migrated to other countries from 1900 to 2000. Most migrated during the First and Second Balkan Wars in 1904 and 1908–1912, as well as during the First and Second World Wars. The Tahirovići (Tahiri) family in Mrkojevići descends from Millë/Mide, while descendants of the Pali brotherhood from Koja/Koći can be also be found.
