= Theodora Kosara =

Bulgarian noblewoman (fl. 1000)

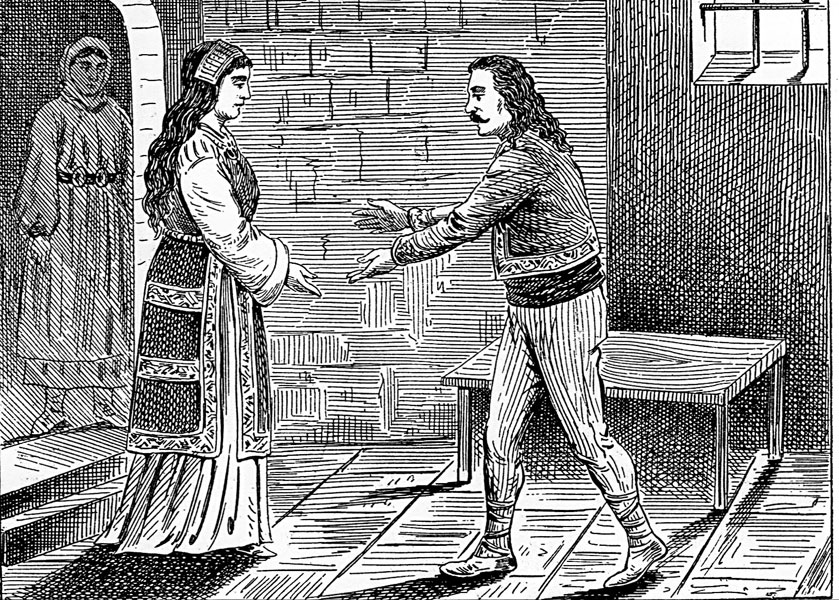
19th-century drawing of Kosara and Jovan Vladimir.

Kosara or Cossara (Bulgarian and Serbian: Косара) was a Bulgarian noblewoman, a daughter or relative of Tsar Samuel of Bulgaria, who was married to Prince Jovan Vladimir of Duklja, the most powerful Serbian principality of the time.

== Origin and identity ==
The 11th-century Byzantine historian John Skylitzes calls her a daughter of Tsar Samuel, but the annotations to Skylitzes by Bishop Michael of Duklja make the passage read ostensibly "a daughter of Theodoritos (sic!) of Samuel." B. Prokić, the first editor of the manuscript (Codex Vindobonensis hist. gr. 74) containing the annotations, emended the interpolated apparent father's name Theodoretos to Theodora, thereby giving the daughter, elsewhere named Kosara, the name Theodora Kosara by which she is often known in much of historiography. Prokić's emendation has been accepted by most scholarship and in most translations.

N. Adontz, on the other hand, accepted the interpolation as is, identifying the ostensible "Theodoritos" as a diminutive reference to Theodore Chryselios, a possible son of John Chryselios, magnate of Dyrrhachium and Samuel's father-in-law, arguing that this Theodore/Theodoretos was Kosara's father, and further supposing that the name Kosara (found in the Gesta Regnum Sclavorum) was not a personal name but a rendition of the Greek family name Chryselios. Adontz' arguments are accepted, except for his interpretation of the name Kosara, by R.-J. Lilie et al. Adontz's reconstruction involves considerable speculation, such as the identification of Theodoretos with the Theodore (no family name given) who surrendered Dyrrhachium to Emperor Basil II in 1005 according to one source, and with Theodore Chryselios, a patrician mentioned at the Emperor Michael VI's court in 1057.

The Gesta Regum Sclavorum (also called Chronicle of the Priest of Duklja), composed in c. 1300, has Kosara (Cossara in the original Latin) as a daughter of Samuel and further implies that her apparent daughter was a granddaughter of Samuel. This source makes no connection between the name Kosara (Cossara) and the Chryselios family, which it calls "Cursilius".

== Life ==
Kosara was married ca. 1000 to Jovan Vladimir, Prince of Duklja, who had been defeated and taken prisoner by Tsar Samuel. An oral (?) tradition recorded in the early 14th century in the Gesta Regum Sclavorum turns the marriage into a romantic tale of Kosara visiting Vladimir in his prison cell, eventually falling in love and asking to be married to him.

The story of Vladimir and Kosara is the subject of one of the most romantic tales of early Montenegrin literature; this is the Gesta’s description of how Vladimir and Kosara met:

It came to pass that Samuel’s daughter, Cossara, was animated and inspired by a beatific soul. She approached her father and begged that she might go down with her maids and wash the head and feet of the chained captives. Her father granted her wish, so she descended and carried out her good work. Noticing Vladimir among the prisoners, she was struck by his handsome appearance, his humility, gentleness and modesty, and the fact that he was full of wisdom and knowledge of the LORD. She stopped to talk to him, and to her his speech seemed sweeter than honey and the honeycomb.

So Kosara fell in love with the handsome captive, and begged her father for his hand in marriage. Samuel, having conquered Vladimir's lands, wanted to bind his new subjects to himself in a more cordial way, not only with the sheer force. He allowed the marriage, returned Duklja to his new son-in-law, and besides gave him the whole territory of Dyrrhachium, to rule them from that point on as his vassal.

Although the Gesta Regum Scalvorum piously asserted that Kosara and Jovan Vladimir lived saintly and chastely, a common trope, they apparently had a daughter, who married Stefan Vojislav, prince of Zeta. Their grandson, Constantine Bodin of Zeta, would be briefly proclaimed emperor of Bulgaria as Peter III in 1072.

Tsar Samuel died in 1014 and he was succeeded by his son Gavril Radomir, but his reign was short: his cousin Ivan Vladislav killed him in 1015, and ruled in his stead. Vladislav held that he would make his position stronger if he exterminated the whole family of Samuil, for which reason he plotted the murder of Jovan Vladimir. The new Tsar thus sent messengers to him to demand his attendance in Prespa, but Vladimir did not want to go out his land; not even after many subsequent Vladislav’s promises and pledges that he meant no harm to him. Finally, Vladislav sent him a golden cross with his pledge on it, to which Vladimir replied:

We believe that our Lord Jesus Christ, who died for us, was suspended not on a golden cross, but on a wooden one. Therefore, if both your faith and your words are true, send me a wooden cross in the hands of religious men, then in accordance with the belief and conviction of the Lord Jesus Christ, I will have faith in the life-giving cross and holy wood. I will come.

Two bishops and a hermit came to Vladimir, gave him a wooden cross, and confirmed that the Tsar had made the pledge on it. Vladimir kissed the cross, collected a few followers, and set off to Prespa. As soon as he arrived there, he went into a church for a prayer. When he came out of the church, he was struck down by Vladislav’s soldiers and beheaded, all the time holding the cross in his hands; it was May 22, 1016.

Jovan Vladimir was buried in Prespa, in the same church in front of which he was martyred. Shortly after his death, he was recognized as a martyr and saint.

Two or three years after Jovan Vladimir’s burial, Kosara transported his remains to Duklja. She interred him near his court in Krajina, in the church of Monastery of the Most Holy Theotokos. Kosara did not marry again; by her will, she was interred in the same church, at the feet of her husband.

== Sources ==
- Андреев, Й. (1999). Кой кой е в Средновековна България. Изд. къща "П. Берон". p. 1. ISBN 954-402-047-0.
- Adontz, Nicolas, "Samuel l'Arménien, roi des Bulgares," Mémoires publiés par l'Académie royale de Belgique 1938, republished in Études Arméno-Byzantines, Lisbon, 1965, pp. 347-407.
- Božilov, Ivan, and Vasil Gjuzelev, Istorija na srednovekovna Bălgarija, VII–XIV vek, Sofia, 2006.
- Fine, Jr, John V. A., The Early Medieval Balkans: A Critical Survey from the Sixth to the Late Twelfth Century, Ann Arbor, 1983.
- Flusin, Bernard, and Jean-Claude Cheynet, transl., Jean Skylitzès, Empereurs de Constantinople, Paris, 2003.
- Gesta Regum Sclavorum I, ed. T. Živković and D. Kunčer, Belgrade, 2009.
- Lilie, Ralph-Johannes; Ludwig, Claudia; Zielke, Beate; Pratsch, Thomas, eds. (2013). "Prosopographie der mittelbyzantinischen Zeit Online". Prosopographie der mittelbyzantinischen Zeit Online. Berlin-Brandenburgische Akademie der Wissenschaften. Nach Vorarbeiten F. Winkelmanns erstellt (in German). De Gruyter.
- Skylitzes, John, ed. H. Thurn, Ioannis Scylitzae Synopsis Historiarum, Corpus Fontium Historiae Byzantinae 5, Berlin, 1973. online
- Worthley, J., transl., John Skylitzes, A Synopsis of Byzantine History 811–1057, Cambridge, 2010.
- Златарски, В. (1927–1971). История на Първото българско Царство. II. От славянизацията на държавата до падането на Първото царство (852—1018). VI. Борба за независимост. Sofia. pp. 673–676.
