= Castus and Emilius =

Saints Castus and Emilius (died 250 AD) are venerated as saints and martyrs by the Eastern Orthodox and Roman Catholic Churches.

They are mentioned by St. Cyprian as having been martyred sometime during the Decian persecution, and were praised by Augustine of Hippo. When they were imprisoned, Castus and Emilius denied that they were Christians under torture and were released. When they were arrested a second time, they refused to abjure Christianity and were burned to death. Their feast day is May 22.
