= List of flags of Montenegro =

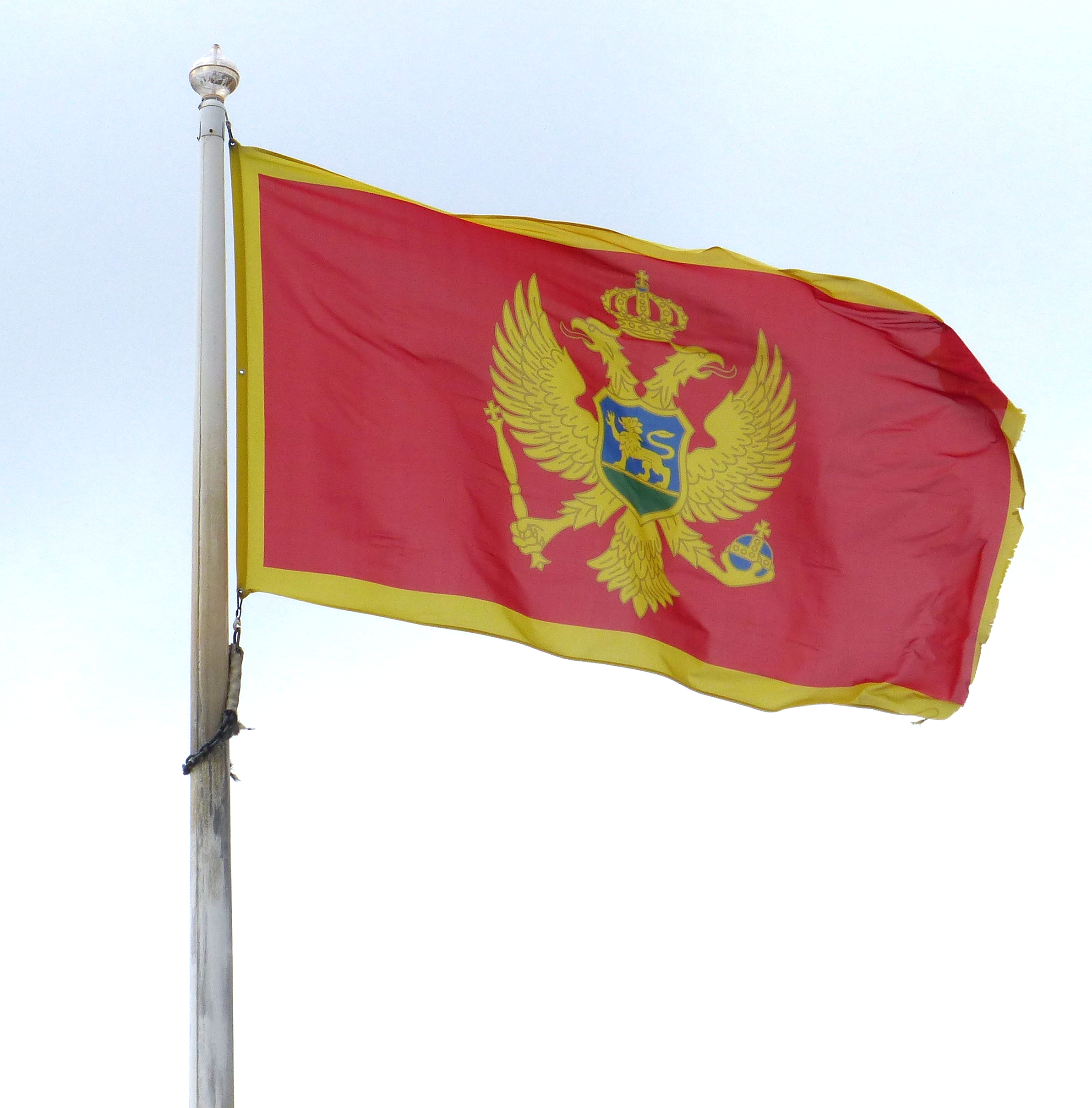
Flag of Montenegro above the Budva Citadel in Budva

This is a list of flags used in Montenegro. For more information about the national flag, visit the article Flag of Montenegro.

== National flags ==
Flag	Date	Use	Description
	2004–	National flag; civil and state ensign; naval ensign until 2010	Red with a golden border and the state coat of arms in the center. Ratio: 1:2. Adopted on 13 July 2004.
	2004–	National flag, vertical banner	Red with a golden border and the state coat of arms in the center

== Standards ==
Flag	Date	Use	Description
	2006–	Standard of the president on land	Square version of the state flag, with a border fleury
	2006–	Standard of the president afloat	Square version of the state flag, replacing red with blue, with a border fleury

== Military ==
Flag	Date	Use	Description
	2010–present	Flag of the Army of Montenegro	Red background with the logo of the Armed Forces of Montenegro and the traditional motto "Čojstvo i Junaštvo" (roughly translated as "Humanity and Courage"), with golden borders
	2010–present	Naval ensign of Montenegro	Blue with the national flag in as its canton, occupying 2/5 of its width and 1/2 of its length with a white anchor interlaced with three lines representing surface of the water in the right side
	2010–present	Naval jack of Montenegro	Coat of arms of Montenegro on blue background, with golden borders

== Municipal flags ==
Flag	Date	Use	Description
	2006–present	Flag of Podgorica	White background with two horizontal blue stripes and one broken line above them.
	2006–present	Flag of Cetinje	White cross pattée on red background
	2006–present	Flag of Bar	Horizontally divided blue-yellow-green-yellow-blue
	2006–present	Flag of Berane	Municipal coat of arms in the center on a white background
	2006–present	Flag of Bijelo Polje	Light blue background with the coat of arms of the municipality in the center
	2006–present	Flag of Budva	Blue background with three golden stars
	2006–present	Flag of Danilovgrad	White background with the coat of arms in the center
	2006–present	Flag of Gusinje	Light blue background with the coat of arms in the center
	2006–present	Flag of Herceg Novi	The coat of arms of the municipality consists of a blue heraldic triangular shield on which is a silver stone-walled tower with a parapet. The flag consists of a white field with a centrally placed upright cross, blue outlined in gold.
	2009–present	Flag of Kotor	The flag is bicolor, with a small emblem located in the center. The flag field is divided into two square panels in equal proportions, white at hoist and red at fly. Red recalls the main colour of the arms. The geometric center of the flag is charged, with the lesser arms placed on a medallion.
	2012–present	Flag of Mojkovac	The flag is a bluish color, with a golden edge and elements of the coat of arms (the monument, a Brskovo coin, and two mining hammers and the Old Bridge), which reflect the cultural and historical heritage, located in the center of the flag's field.
	2004–present	Flag of Nikšić	The flag is blue with the municipal coat of arms.
	2013–present	Flag of Petnjica	The flag is white, with the emblem of the municipality in the center. The blue line near the bottom of the flag symbolizes the water resources of the municipality. The green line near the top of the flag symbolizes the natural environment of the municipality, with well-preserved landscapes and fertile land.
	2006–present	Flag of Plav	Blue, embroidered in gold, with embroidered emblem in the center
	2006–present	Flag of Rožaje	The flag is vertically divided white-green with the municipal coat of arms in the center. White stands for peace, while green stands for the natural resources of the municipality.
	2006–present	Flag of Šavnik	Divided blue-white with the coat of arms in the center
	2004–present	Flag of Tivat	The municipal flag is light blue with the coat of arms in the center.
	2018–present	Flag of Tuzi	The municipal flag is light blue with the coat of arms in the center.
	2006–present	Flag of Ulcinj	The municipal flag is white with the coat of arms in the center.
	Unknown	Flag of Žabljak	The municipal flag is white with the coat of arms in the center.

== Ethnic groups' flags ==
Flag	Date	Use	Description
	2006–present	The national flags of Serbs in Montenegro	Flag of the Kingdom of Montenegro, nowadays used as an ethnic flag for the Serbs of Montenegro
	2008–present	The national flags of Serbs in Montenegro	Horizontal tricolor of red, blue, and white with golden cross pattée
	2004–present	The national flag of Bosniaks in Montenegro	White background with the coat of arms in the center
	2020–present	The national flag of Albanians in Montenegro	A red field with a black two-headed eagle in the center
	2020–present	The national flag of Croats in Montenegro	A horizontal tricolour of red, white, and blue, with the coat of arms in the centre
	2020–present	The national flag of Romani people in Montenegro	Horizontal bicolor of blue and green with a red wheel
	2008–present	The national flag of Turks in Montenegro	A red field with a white star and crescent slightly left of center

== Historical flags ==
=== National flags ===
Flag	Date	Use	Description
	1451–1496	Flag of medieval Montenegrin state Zeta	Red flag with golden double-headed eagle
	1516–1852	Flag of the Prince-Bishopric of Montenegro	White cross pattée on red background
	1516–1852	Flag of the Prince-Bishopric of Montenegro	Red cross pattée on white background
	1767–1773	Flag of Montenegro during the reign of Stephen the Little	White background with red borders
	1852–1860	Flag of the Principality of Montenegro under Danilo I	Red flag with white double-headed eagle
	1860–1905	Flag of the Principality of Montenegro under Nicholas I	Red flag with white double-headed eagle
	1905–1918	State flag of the Principality (1905–10) and the Kingdom of Montenegro (1910–18)	Red-blue-white tricolor with white double-headed eagle
	1905–1918	Civil flag of the Principality (1905–10) and the Kingdom of Montenegro (1910–18)	Red-blue-white tricolor
	1941–1943	Flag of Kingdom of Montenegro	Red-blue-white tricolor
	1943–1944	Flag used during the German occupation of Montenegro	Red-blue-white tricolor
	1945–1993	Flag of the People's/Socialist Republic of Montenegro	Red-blue-white tricolor with the communist red star
	1993–2004	Flag of the Republic of Montenegro	Red-bluish-white tricolour, with "bluish" (plavetna/плаветна) meaning light blue

=== Royal flags ===
Flag	Date	Use	Description
	15th century	Flag of the House of Crnojević	Flag during regime of House of Crnojević in Principality of Zeta (1451–1496)
	Theocratical rule of Petrović-Njegoš dynasty	Banner of the Prince-bishops of Montenegro and Metropolitans of Cetinje from House of Petrović	Orthodox red cross in a white field with a red border. Represents the highly Christian virtue of subjected peoples and the desire to fight against invading Islam. Adopted during the Great Turkish War at the end of the 17th century.
	c. 1852	Princely standard	Court flag and princely standard during regime of Danilo I Petrović-Njegoš
	1861–1900	Princely standard	Court flag and princely standard during regime of Nikola I Petrović-Njegoš
	1910–1918	Royal standard of the King of Montenegro	The lion was replaced by Nikola's cypher, "H.I." The crown was changed from a princely to a royal crown.

=== Civil ensigns ===
Flag	Date	Use	Description
	1881–1916	Civil ensign flag	Tricolor with the Cyrillic cypher НІ (i.e. NI) of Prince Nicholas I topped with a golden crown in the center. Because the owners as well as the crew of Montenegro's Ulcinj cruisers were Muslims, Nikola changed the flag so as not to offend Islam.
	1881–1916	Civil ensign flag	Version of the civil ensign that was predominantly used. Usage extended beyond primary purpose to even of that of the national flag.
	Late 1880–early 1881	Civil ensign flag	Tricolor flag with the cross from the war flag (krstaš-barjak) with Nicholas' initials set in canton; stripes based on domestic national flag
	Early 1880s–late 1880s	Civil ensign flag	Horizontally divided red-white-red with the cross from the war flag (krstaš-barjak) with Nicholas' initials set in canton; based on the naval flag of Austria-Hungary according to the Dalmatian marine codelines sanctioned by the 1878 Congress of Berlin

=== Military flags ===
Flag	Date	Use	Description
	1876–78	War flag, civil flag	The Montenegrin war flag used in the Battle of Vučji Do (1876) was red with a white cross pattée in the center and a white border. This flag was used in Cetinje in 1878, upon recognition of the independence of Principality of Montenegro by the Ottoman Empire at San Stefano.
	19th century	Montenegrin naval flags from the late 19th century	The Montenegrin naval flags and civil ensigns during the rule of Prince Nicholas I of Montenegro
	Early 19th century–1880	Naval ensign (unofficial)	White flag with a red St George's Cross. Inspired by the British Naval Ensign back from the 1814 British navy's takeover of the port of Kotor during the war between the Montenegrins and the French Empire.
	Reign of Prince Danilo Petrović-Njegoš	War flag of Prince Danilo Army	Flag signifying a unit of 1,000 men; red field with the double-headed eagle and Prince Danilo I's initials in it. Alaj-barjak of Prince Danilo, signifying the supreme command over the Montenegrin army.
	Reign of Prince Danilo Petrović-Njegoš	War flag in Prince Danilo's Army	Flag signifying a unit of 100 men; red field, with the traditional Montenegrin Cross of Saint George and Danilo I's initials on it. Introduced by Prince Danil during his martial reforms. Based upon the old tribal Montenegrin flag.

== Political flags ==
Flag	Date	Party	Description
Current
	2020s–present	Reconstruction of the flag used by Montenegrin Greens widely used by Montenegrin nationalists	
Former
	1943–1991	League of Communists of Montenegro	
	1920s–1940s	Flag used by Montenegrin Greens	

== See also ==
- Flag of Montenegro
- Coat of arms of Montenegro
- Armorial of Montenegro
