= Armorial of Montenegro =

This is a list of coats of arms of Montenegro. Most municipalities of Montenegro have their own coat of arms. Many Montenegrin military units and other public agencies and some private families have coats of arms. There are also many historical Montenegrin coat of arms throughout history.

== Montenegro ==
Coat of arms of Montenegro

State Seal of Montenegro

Coat of arms of Montenegrin Armed Forces

== Historical coat of arms ==
=== Medieval Period ===
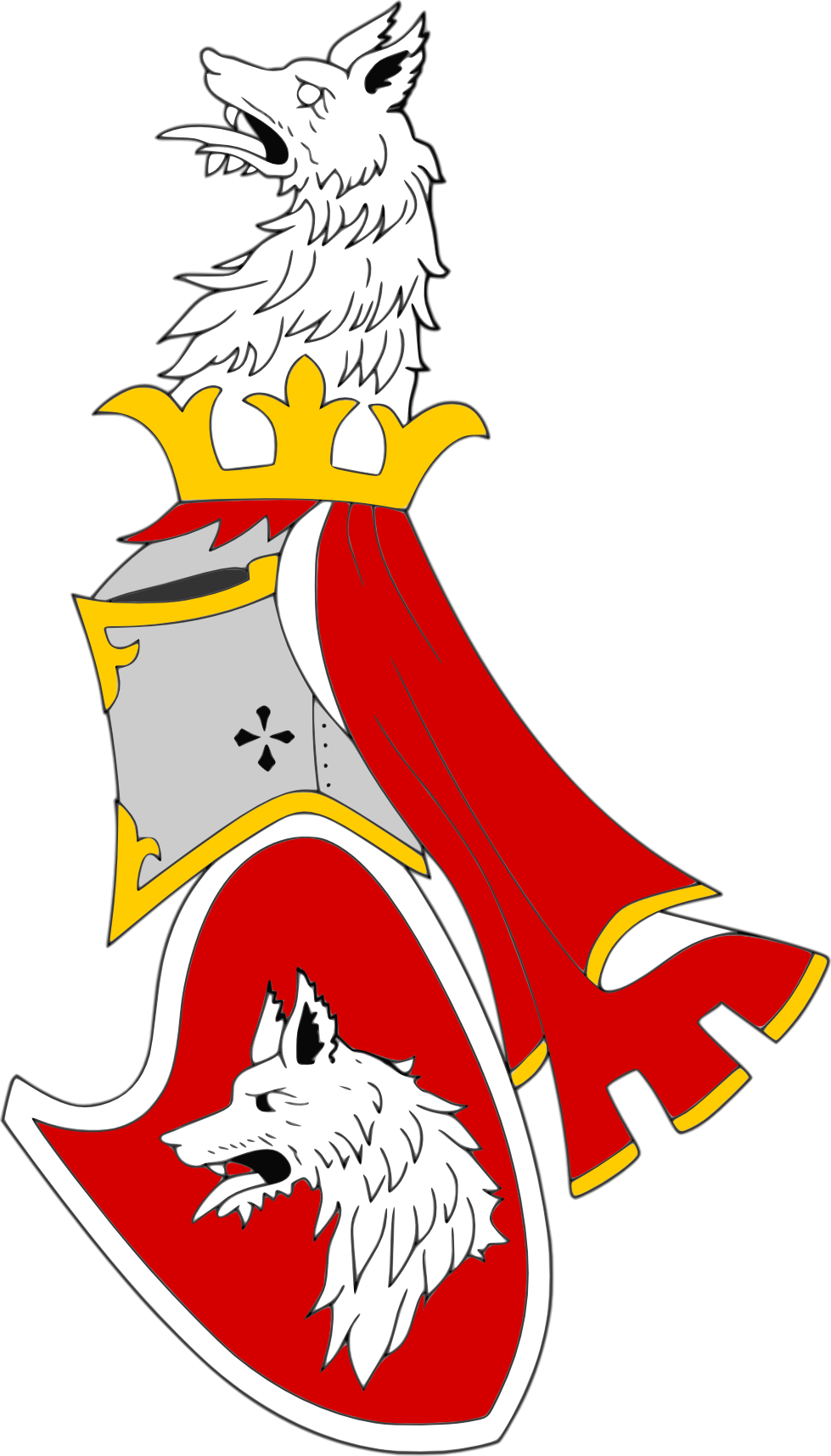
Coat of arms of the House of Balšić

Coat of arms of the House of Crnojević

=== 17th–20th Century ===
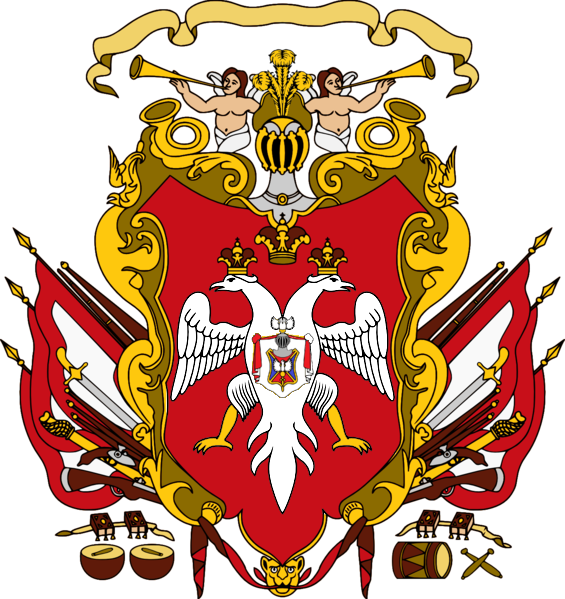
Coat of arms under Prince-bishop Danilo I (1696–1735)

Coat of arms during rule of prince-bishops Danilo and Vasilije

Coat of arms of Montenegro during rule of prince-bishop Sava

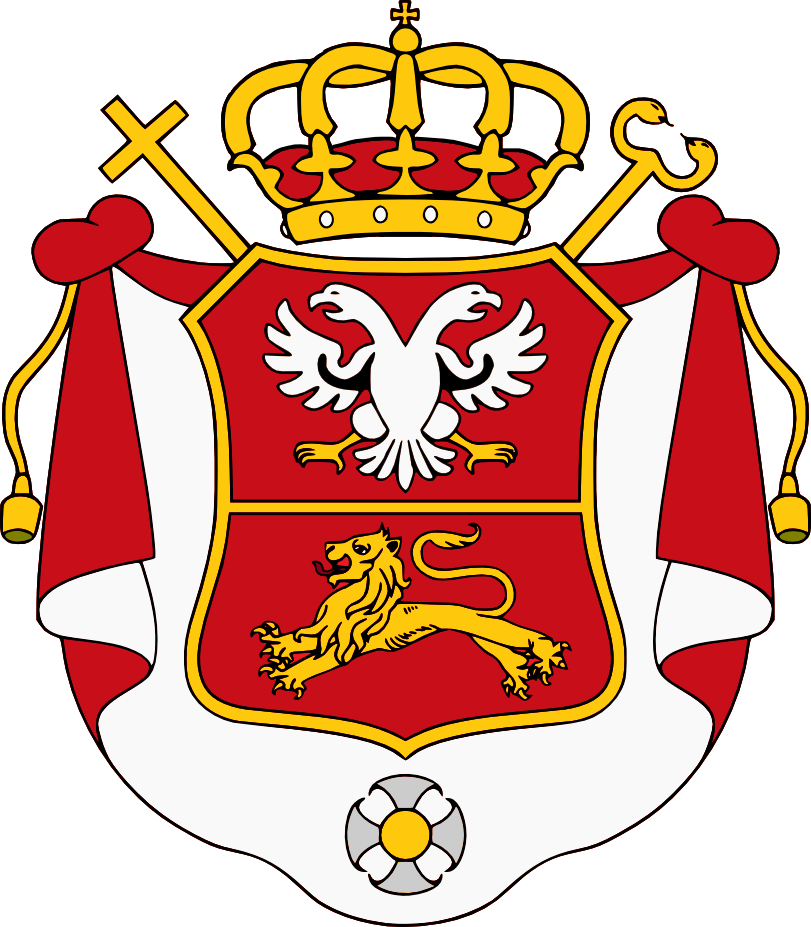
Personal Coat of arms of Prince-bishop Peter I

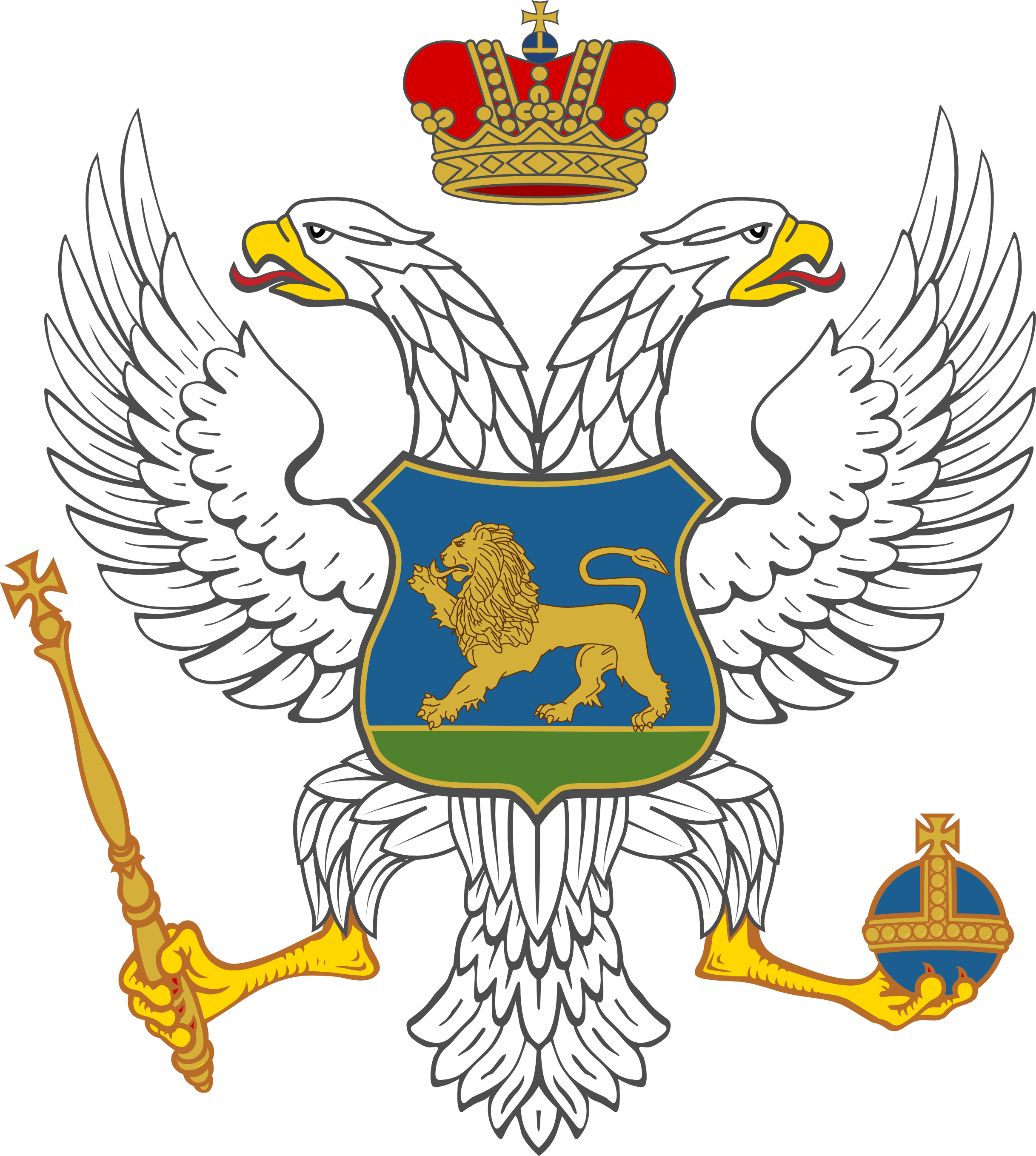
Personal Coat of arms of Prince-bishop Peter II

Personal Coat of arms of Prince Danilo

Coat of arms of the Principality of Montenegro

Coat of arms of the Kingdom of Montenegro(1910-1918)

=== Late-20th Century ===
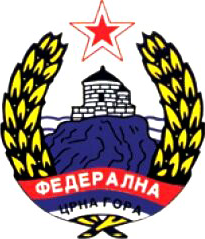
Coat of arms of Federal State of Montenegro (1944-1947)

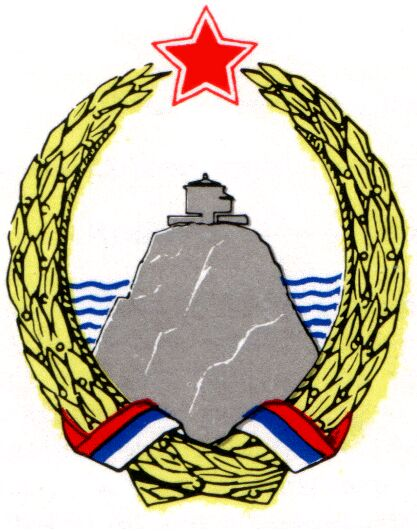
Coat of arms of the People's Republic of Montenegro (1947-1963)

Emblem of the Socialist Republic of Montenegro (1963–1974)

Coat of arms of Socialist Republic of Montenegro (1974-1994)

Coat of arms of the Republic of Montenegro (1994-2004)

== Municipalities of Montenegro ==
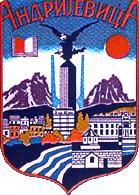
Coat of arms of Andrijevica

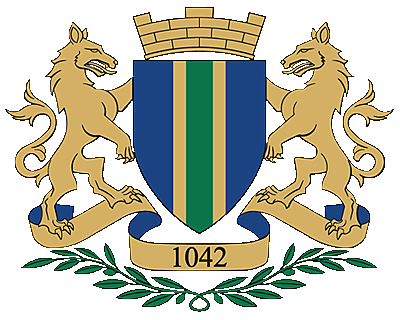
Coat of arms of Bar

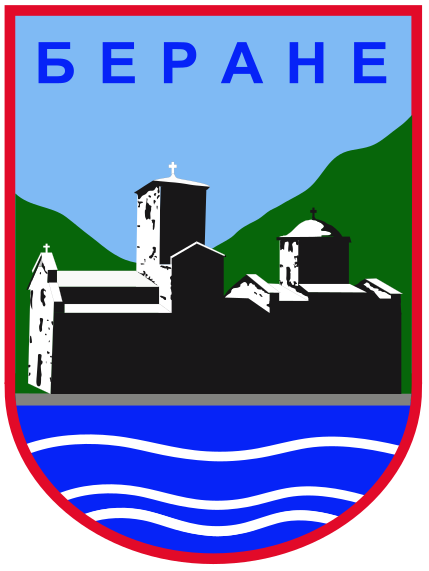
Coat of arms of Berane

Coat of arms of Bijelo Polje

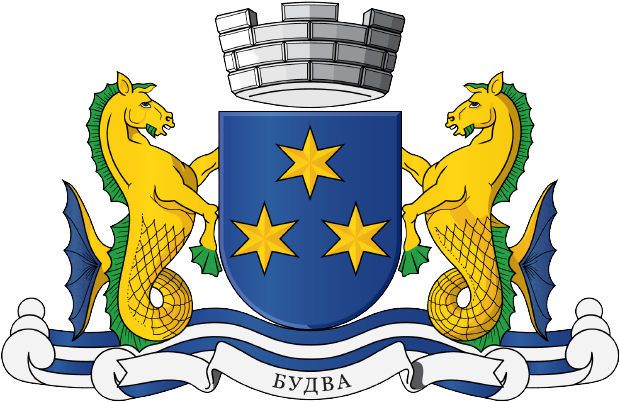
Coat of arms of Budva

Coat of arms of Cetinje

Coat of arms of Danilovgrad

Coat of arms of Gusinje

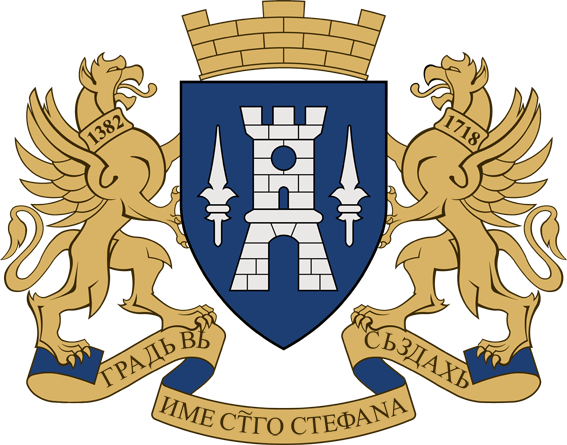
Coat of arms of Herceg Novi

Coat of arms of Kolašin

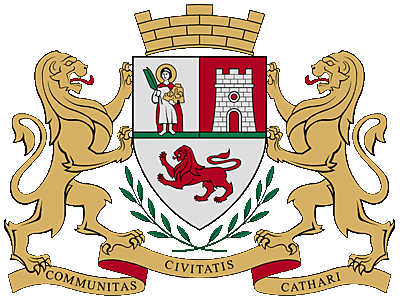
Coat of arms of Kotor

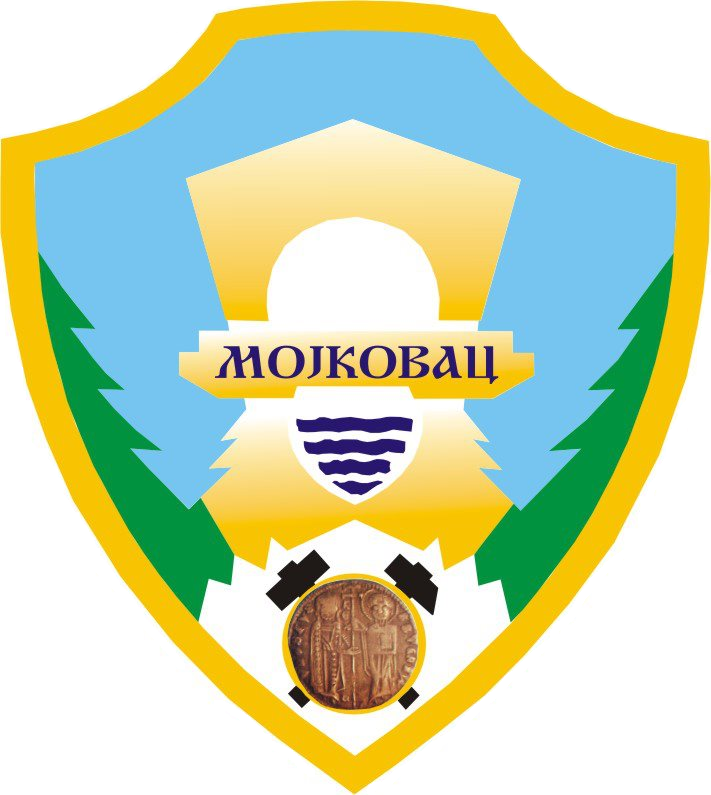
Coat of arms of Mojkovac

Coat of arms of Nikšić

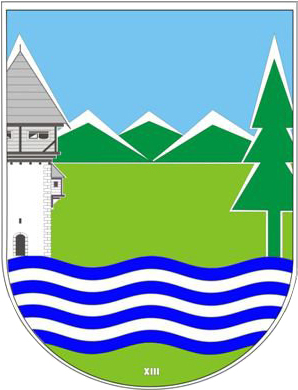
Coat of arms of Plav

Coat of arms of Pljevlja

Coat of arms of Plužine

Coat of arms of Podgorica

Coat of arms of Rožaje

Coat of arms of Šavnik

Coat of arms of Tivat

Coat of arms of Tuzi

Coat of arms of Ulcinj

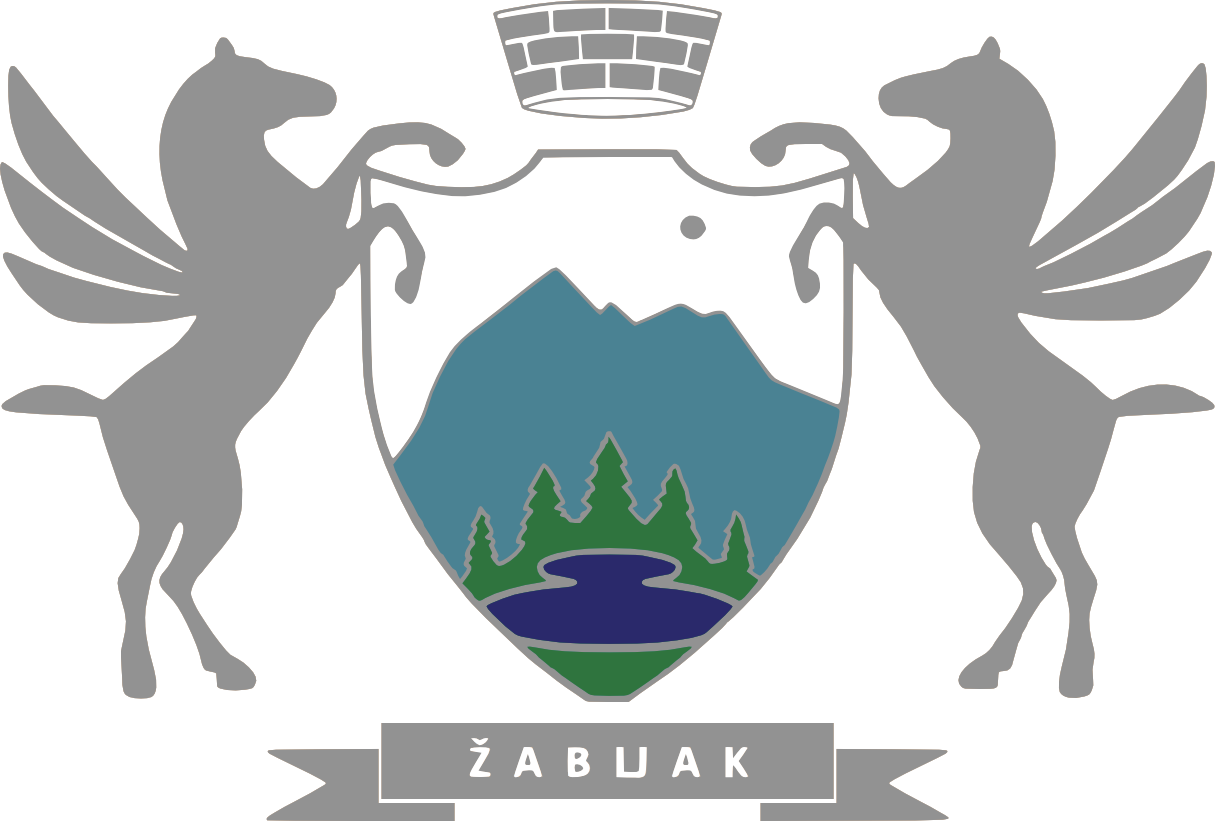
Coat of arms of Žabljak
