= Church of St. Jovan Vladimir, Bar =

Serbian Orthodox church in Bar, Montenegro

Coordinates: 42.10139°N 19.09403°E

Church of St. Jovan Vladimir

- Location within Montenegro

Religion
- Affiliation: Serbian Orthodox Church
- Ecclesiastical or organizational status: Metropolitanate of Montenegro and the Littoral

Location
- Location: Bar, Montenegro, Montenegro
- Interactive map of Church of St. Jovan Vladimir

Architecture
- Architect: Predrag Ristić
- Completed: 2006-2016

The Church of St. Jovan Vladimir (Serbian: Храм Светог Јована Владимира, romanized: Hram Svetog Jovana Vladimira) is a Serbian Orthodox church located in Bar, Montenegro. It was built between 2006 and 2016.
