= Coat of arms of Bar =

Coat of arms of Bar

Flag of Bar

The coat of arms of Bar is an official insignia of Bar, coastal town in Montenegro, and its main seaport. This is a new coat of arms, adopted on 15 December 2006. It is designed by Srđan Marlović, who also designed the coat of arms of Podgorica and that of Kotor.

== Description of the coat of arms ==
The coat of arms consists of the shield, divided into five fields, and is symmetric about its vertical axis. The blue color represents the waterbodies (Adriatic Sea and Lake Scutari), the golden colour represents inhabited urban settlements in the Lake Scutari and Crmnica basins, and the green represents the mountain massif that separates the two. The shield is topped with the wall crown with three merlons, and is surrounded by the golden wolves as supporters, and with green olive twig and a golden banner at the bottom. The banner reads "1042", a year in which the Battle of Bar took place. The banner has a golden obverse, and a blue reverse.

The Flag of Bar features the symbolism identical to that of the coat of arms.
