= Coat of arms of Podgorica =

Symbol of Podgorica

Versions
- Middle coat of arms

- Lesser coat of arms
- Adopted: 2006

The coat of arms of Podgorica is an official insignia of Podgorica, capital of Montenegro. It is a new coat of arms, adopted as a symbol of the city in 2006. It replaced the old coat of arms, which was thought outdated aesthetically. The author is Srđan Marlović.

== Description of the coat of arms ==
- The silver shield represents water. Among all characteristics of this municipality, the most important one is its richness in water (6 rivers and Skadar Lake, the biggest lake in South Europe).
- The layers of urban heritage in this municipality (Doclea and Meteon) are presented by two blue horizontal stripes. Metaphorically, they present the foundation of the present city of Podgorica.
- The universal symbol, whose creation was based on stylisation of all recognisable symbols of modern Podgorica that we know today: Nemanja's town, the clock tower, Gorica monument, gates, bridges, etc. are all combined into one symbol, a broken line positioned above the 2 horizontal stripes.
- The crown represents the town's status as Montenegro's capital city.
- Two silver lions act as supporters and are inspired by the oldest known coat of arms on Podgorica municipality, the arms of Božidar Vuković-Podgoričanin.
- The golden wine leaves represent the vineyards that Podgorica is known for.

== Historical coats of arms ==
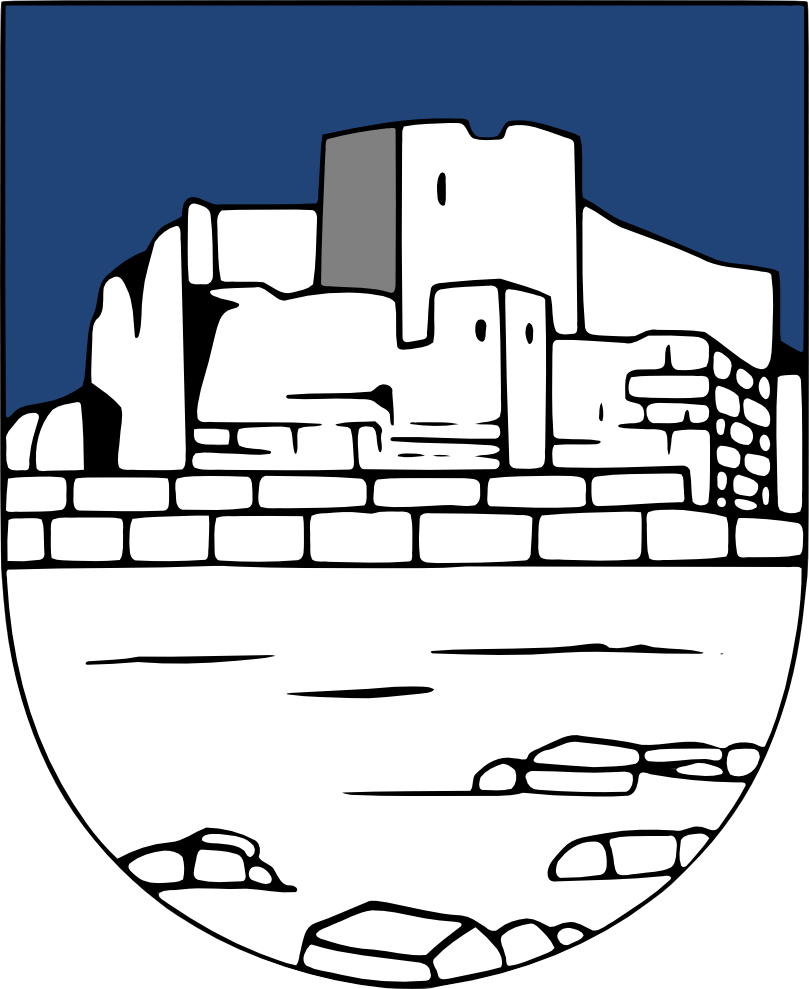
Pre-WWII Coat of arms of Podgorica.

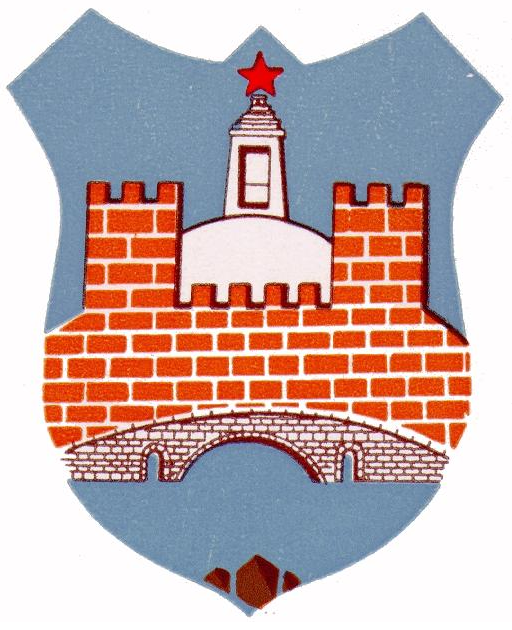
Coat of arms of Titograd during the SFRY times.

== See also ==
- Armorial of Montenegro
- Flag of Podgorica
