= Flag of Podgorica =

Flag of Podgorica

The Flag of Podgorica, along with its coat of arms, is a symbol of Podgorica, capital of Montenegro. It was adopted as a symbol of the city in 2006. It is derived from a detail on a new coat of arms. The author is Srđan Marlović.

The layers of urban heritage in this municipality (Doclea and Meteon) were presented by two blue horizontal stripes. Metaphorically, they present the foundation of the present city of Podgorica.

The universal symbol, whose creation was based on stylisation of all recognisable symbols of modern Podgorica: Nemanja's town, Clock tower, Gorica monument, Gates, Bridges, etc. All these sights were united in one symbol, a broken line that was positioned above two horizontal stripes.
