= Bar, Montenegro =

Bar Бар Tivar
- City and municipality
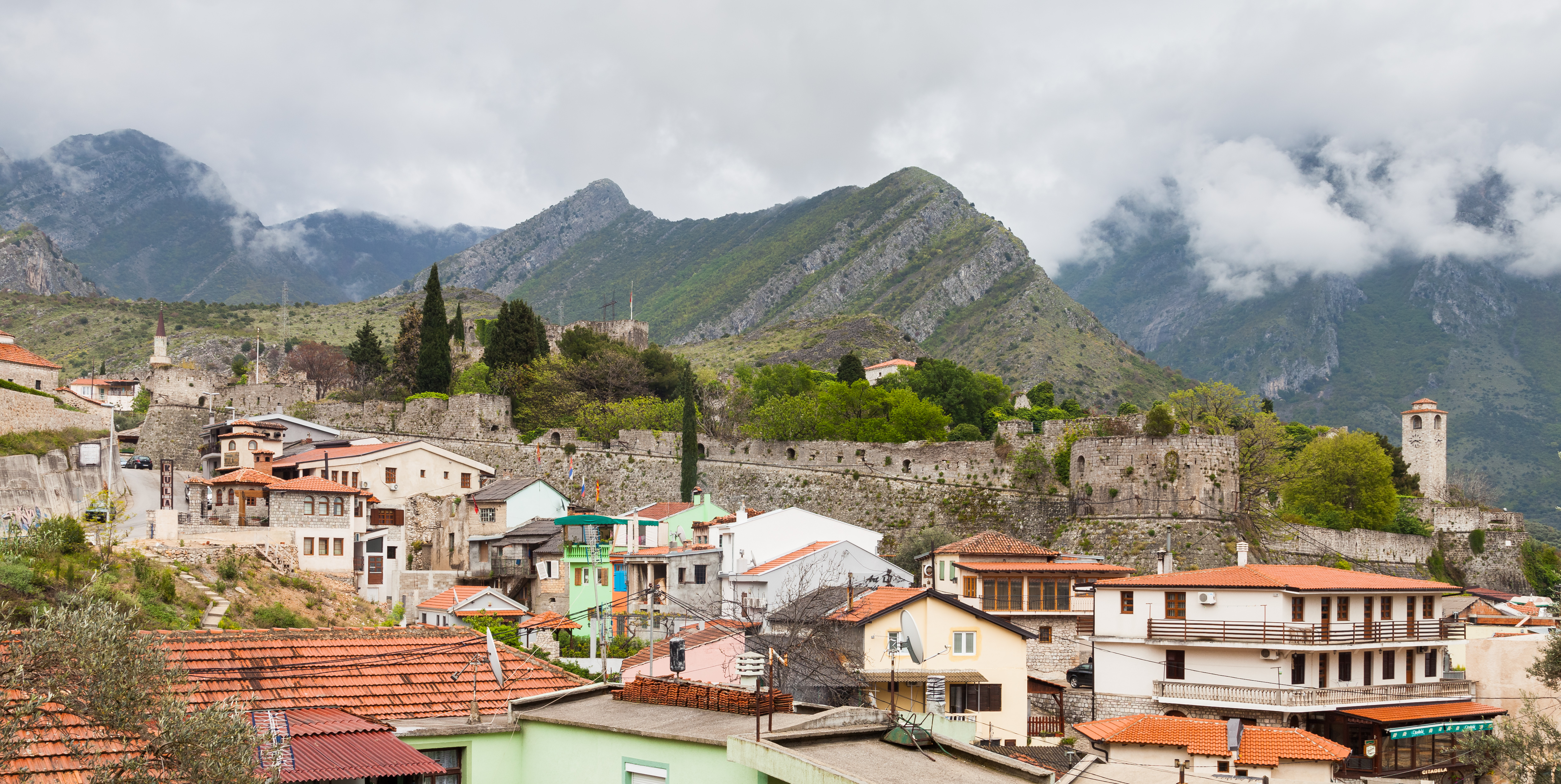
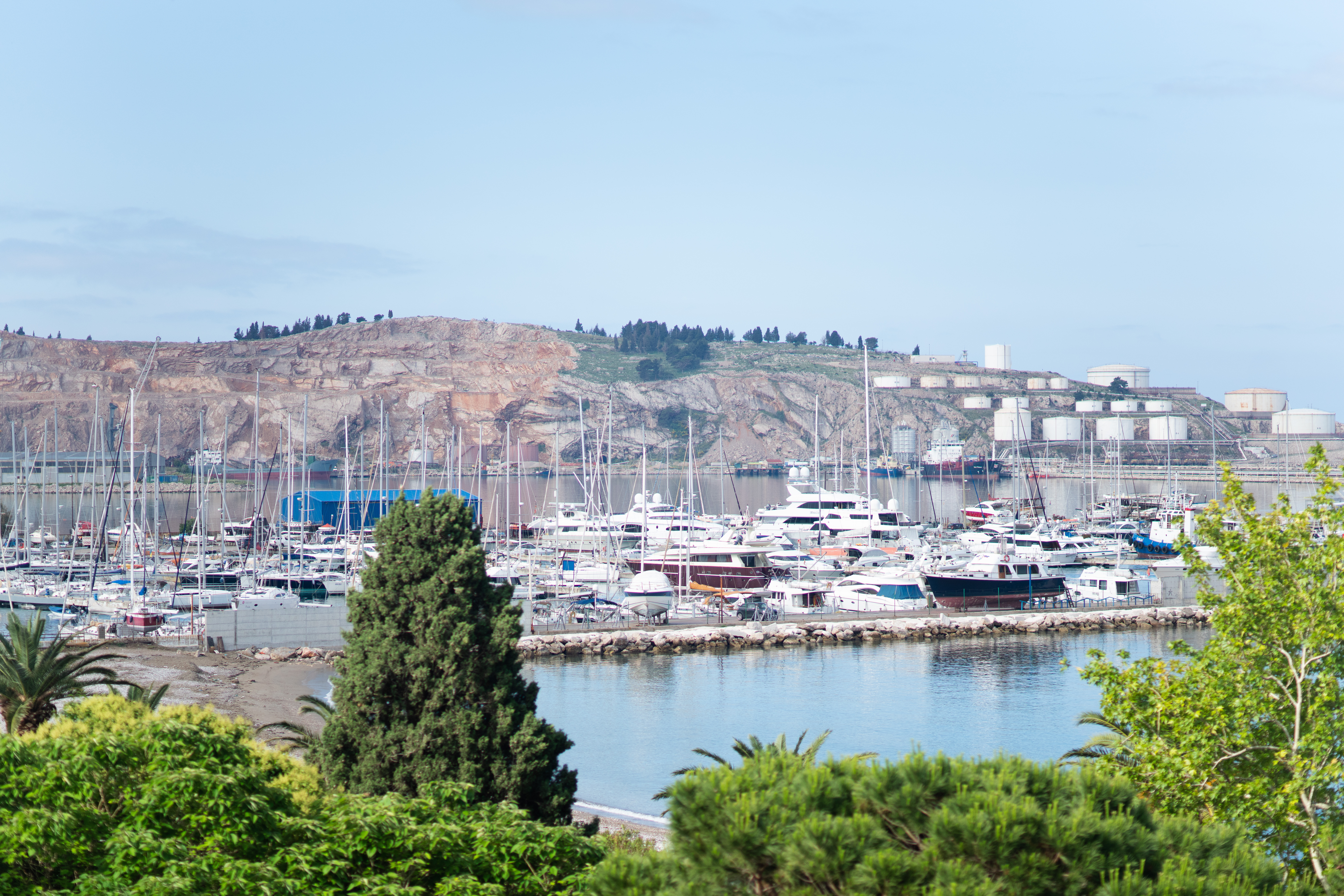
- From the top, Stari Bar, Church of St. Jovan Vladimir, The Port of Bar

- Flag Coat of arms

- Location within Montenegro
- Coordinates: 42.10°N 19.10°E
- Country: Montenegro
- Region: Coastal
- Municipality: Bar
- Settlements: 85

Government
  - Type: Mayor-Assembly
  - Mayor: Dušan Raičević (DPS)

Area
  - City and municipality: 598 km^{2} (231 sq mi)

Population (2023 census)
  - Rank: 3rd in Montenegro
  - Density: 67/km^{2} (170/sq mi)
  - Urban: 15,868 ▲
  - Rural: 30,303 ▲
  - Municipality: 46,171 ▲
- Demonym: Barani
- Time zone: UTC+1 (CET)
  - Summer (DST): UTC+2 (CEST)
- Postal code: 85000
- Area code: +382 30
- ISO 3166-2 code: ME-02
- Car plates: BR
- Climate: Csa, Cfa
- Website: Official website

Bar (Montenegrin: Bar, (Note: Written identically in Bosnian, Croatian and Serbian.) Бар, (Note: Written identically in Serbian Cyrillic.) pronounced [bâr], Italian: Antivari, Albanian: Tivari) is a town and seaport in Coastal region of Montenegro. It is the capital of the Bar Municipality and a centre for tourism. According to the 2023 census, the city proper had 15,868 inhabitants, while the total population of Bar Municipality was 46,171.

== Name ==
Bar is supposed to be a shortened Slavic variant of Antivari. The name is thought to be derived from the Latin Antibarum or Antibari, which later in Greek was transformed into Antivárion / Antivari due to its pronunciation. "Antibari", meaning "opposite Bari", is a name taken because of it is location across the Adriatic Sea from Bari in Italy. Variations are in Italian, Antivari / Antibari; in Albanian, Tivari or Tivar; in Turkish, Bar; in Greek, Θηβάριον, Thivárion, Αντιβάριον, Antivárion; in Latin, Antibarium.

== History ==
=== Ancient times ===
Archaeological findings of substantial extent prove the presence of life in this location during prehistoric times. Local archaeological findings date to the Neolithic era. It is assumed that Bar was mentioned as the reconstructed Roman castle, Antipargal, in the 6th century. The name Antibarium was quoted for the first time in the 10th century.

=== Middle Ages ===
In the 6th and 7th centuries, Slavs occupied the Balkans. Duklja, a Slavic state, was mentioned in the 10th century. Jovan Vladimir (ruler 1000–1016), of Skadarska Krajina, is the first ruler of Duklja whose history is known. Stefan Vojislav (ruler 1018–1043), the eponymous founder of the Vojislavljević dynasty, defeated the Byzantines in a battle on a hill near Bar. He made Bar his seat of power. Vojislav then expanded the area under his rule. Mihailo I of Duklja (ruler 1050–1081), Vojislav's son, established the Archdiocese of Antivari. He continued to fight the Byzantines to secure the town's independence. This led to a union of states known as the Serbian Grand Principality. From 1101 to 1166, the principality was ruled by the Vukanović dynasty. However, from 1166 to 1183, Bar was under Byzantine rule. In 1183, Stefan Nemanja conquered and destroyed Bar. Until 1360, it was ruled by the Nemanjić dynasty. From 1360 onward, it came under the control of the Balšić noble family, and Queen Jelena and Balša III established the capital there.

=== Venetian and Ottoman period ===
Between 1405 and 1412. Venetians controlled Bar, and this was also the time when the city had the most growth. The Venetians granted the Barans rights in an effort to appease and win them over, and as a result, Bar developed into a city-state. Barans had their own Statute of Communes, were in charge of their own defence, possessed judicial authority, printed their own currency, and were exempt from military service in times of war. After the Venetians, Bar was again ruled by the Balšićs. Stefan Lazarević and Đurađ Branković also occupied Bar in the first half of the 15th century.

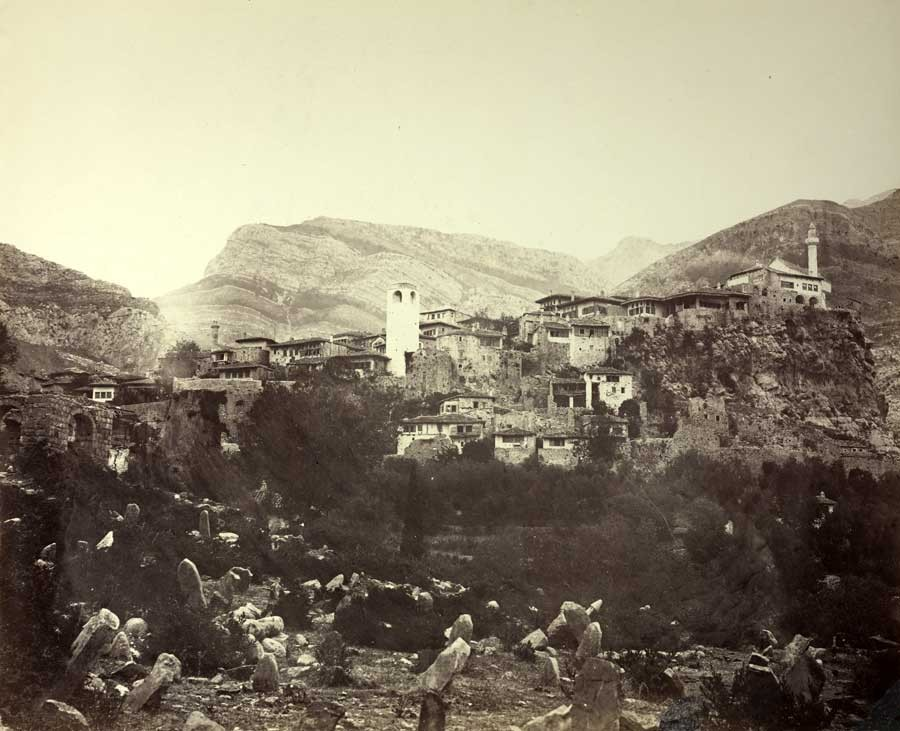
Bar in 1863

From 1443 to 1571, the region was ruled by the Venetians, who called it Antivari, and it was part of the Venetian Albania. It was a town with its own coat of arms, flag, statute and mint. In 1571, the Ottomans captured Antivari and held the town until 1878. The archdiocese was preserved. With the Ottoman conquest, the Catholic Church in the border area and the Archdiocese of Bar began to collapse, because indigenous people who began to migrate to that area as Ottomans brought a new ethnic and religious element. Because of a lack of Catholic priests, entire parishes were converted to Orthodoxy. One of the archbishops during this period was Andrija Zmajević.

In 1571, the Ottomans expelled the Orthodox and Catholic population.

In 1878, the Ottomans ceded Antivari to Montenegro at the Treaty of Berlin, after losing the Russo-Turkish War. Montenegro's initial main goal in the negotiations was its expansion into Herzegovina and the Sanjak of Novi Pazar, but Austro-Hungarian expansion made it unrealistic. The Ottomans, represented by Alexander Karatheodori Pasha, declared that they would cede the port of Spizza to Montenegro but not Bar and other areas because they claimed they were primarily inhabited by Catholics and Muslim Albanians. After negotiations between Foreign Ministers Gyula Andrássy (Austria-Hungary) and Pyotr Andreyevich Shuvalov (Russia), it was agreed that Bar would be ceded to Montenegro in return for Russian support for Austrian control over Herzegovina. The city-port of Bar itself became militarily neutral, the total number of Montenegrin vessels in the port was placed under limitations and Austria-Hungary acquired the right of patrol of Bar's coastline.

In 1885, the castle of King Nikola was built for Princess Zorka and his future son-in-law Prince Petar Karađorđević. The palace was originally known as Vila Topolica; the Petrović-Njegoš family later purchased it from the Karađorđevićs. The complex consists of a large palace, a small palace, a chapel, two guard towers, a winter garden, and a park. A wooden pier in front of the palace was used for mooring ships and yachts. The complex also contains a large flower garden with a distinctive metal structure, reportedly a gift from the Italian royal family, which is now used as the Knjaževa bašta restaurant. Today, the palace houses the Bar Homeland Museum and the complex is used for cultural events.

In the new Montenegrin Orthodox state, Bar went through urban depopulation because many of its urban inhabitants were Muslims, who either left or were expelled from the town. In the late 1850s, the town had 4,000 inhabitants, 62.5% of whom were Muslims. More than half of its population left or was expelled after 1878. The first population register of the town under Montenegrin administration in 1879 counted 1,879 inhabitants. Muslims were 30.9% of the population, 24.6% were Catholics (mostly Albanians) in addition to Orthodox (mostly Montenegrins and Serbs).

=== Contemporary ===
When the Montenegrins recaptured the city after the Russo-Turkish War, life could not be organized in it due to the destruction of war. The population first moved to Podgrađe, and the urban core was formed at the beginning of the 20th century below Volujica. The settlement is called Pristan (Novi Bar).

Guglielmo Marconi, the Italian scientist and pioneer in wireless telegraphy, using Nikola Tesla's patented technology, made a radio connection between Antivari (Bar) and Bari on 30 August 1904. In 1908, the first railroad in this part of the Balkans was put into operation there.

On 8 August 1914, Austria-Hungary responded to Montenegro's declaration of war by sending its protected cruisers SMS Zenta and SMS Szigetvár accompanied by the destroyer SMS Uskoke and torpedo boat 72F to conduct an unopposed bombardment of the port of Antivari, targeting its wireless station and harbour facilities. They were driven away by coastal batteries and destroyed only a wireless station. The Austrians declared a formal blockade of the Montenegrin coastline on 10 August. On 16 August, SMS Zenta and an accompanying destroyer were ambushed and trapped off Antivari by a very large French fleet (over twelve battleships), and in the subsequent Battle of Antivari the Zenta was sunk with considerable loss of life. The destroyer escaped. On 18 September following, the Austro-Hungarian coastal battleship SMS Budapest with supporting warships bombarded Antivari, the port and facilities, causing major damage, and on 17–18 October the destroyers SMS Scharfschutze, SMS Streiter and SMS Ulan bombarded Antivari's harbour. On November 18 the destroyer SMS Uskoke also conducted a brief bombardment. The Austrians made their largest raid to date on the evening and night of 1–2 March 1915 when their destroyers SMS Csikós, SMS Streiter, and SMS Ulan covered a raid by three torpedo-boats into Antivari harbour. The latter destroyed the main wharf and stocks of food and ammunition along the waterfront, and captured the Montenegrin royal yacht Rumija, which was later torpedoed. The destruction of the wharves prevented larger ships from unloading supplies at the port, restricting Allied shipments of food and munitions to the Montenegrin army. The Allies realised that with the Austro-Hungarian naval base of Cattaro close by, there was little they could do.

In 1918, Bar became part of the Kingdom of Serbs, Croats and Slovenes.

In 1945, Albanians in Bar were massacred by Yugoslav partisans. This event is known as the Bar massacre.

In 1976, Pristan was demolished, with the aim of expanding the Port in its place. The population was mainly moved to Topolica, where, until urbanization, there was only a complex of the Castle of King Nicholas.

After the catastrophic earthquake of 1979, especially conditioned by the work of the Port of Bar, the city experienced a demographic boom. In the period until 1990, Bar was one of the crucial ports of SFR Yugoslavia, which was invested in and which became the political, industrial, tourist, cultural, and sports centre of the region. This was especially contributed to by the opening of the roads Bar-Titograd in 1959 and Bar-Belgrade in 1976.

When Montenegro signed an agreement with the Chinese Government to build a motorway from Bar to the Serbian border (part of the Belt and Road initiative) in 2014, large tracts of land around Bar were agreed as collateral in the event of the Montenegro government defaulting on payment of the 1 billion dollar loan. The project was financed by the Export-Import Bank of China. Contractual disputes can only be resolved through a Chinese court.

== Geography ==
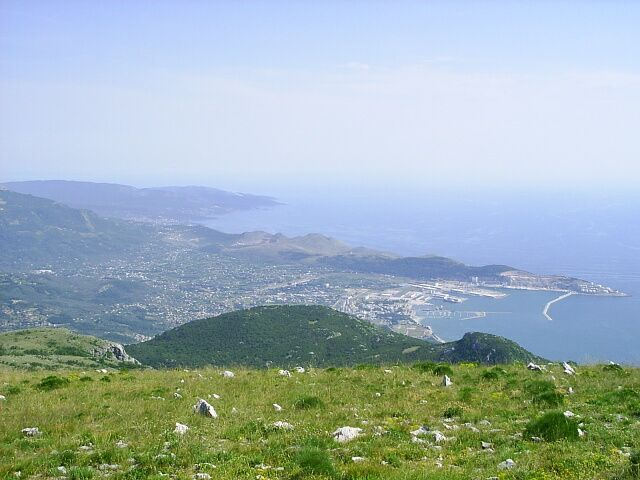
View of Bar from Vrsuta mountain

=== Location ===
Bar is located on the western coastal border of Montenegro on the shore of the Adriatic Sea. It is approximately 53 kilometres (33 mi) from Podgorica, the capital of Montenegro. To the east is the largest lake in South Europe, Lake Skadar. To the west, across the sea, is Italy.

=== Climate ===
Bar has a borderline humid subtropical (Cfa) and Mediterranean climate (Csa) in the Köppen climate classification, since the driest month has 37 mm (1.5 inches) of precipitation, preventing it from being classified as solely humid subtropical or Mediterranean. Winters are cool and rainy, with an average high of 12.3 °C (54.1 °F) in January and a low of 4.3 °C (39.7 °F). Snow is a very rare occurrence in Bar; it usually snows once in a few years. The highest recorded snowfall occurred during January 2000, when 9 centimetres (3.5 in) was measured. Summers are generally warmer, drier and sunnier than the winter months. During summer, the highest temperatures are around 27 to 28 °C (81 to 82 °F) and the lowest 18 °C (64 °F). Precipitation is low during the summer months, although rainfall can still occur, with July averaging 4.5 days with measurable precipitation. Spring and fall are transitional seasons that feature mild weather that can often be wet and unpredictable. There are, on average, 2523 hours of sunshine per year, ranging from a low of 111.6 hours in December to a high of 350.3 hours in July.

Climate data for Bar (1991–2020 normals, extremes 1949–present)
| Month | Jan | Feb | Mar | Apr | May | Jun | Jul | Aug | Sep | Oct | Nov | Dec | Year |
|---|---|---|---|---|---|---|---|---|---|---|---|---|---|
| Record high °C (°F) | 21.2 (70.2) | 27.2 (81.0) | 26.0 (78.8) | 30.7 (87.3) | 32.5 (90.5) | 36.6 (97.9) | 37.7 (99.9) | 37.0 (98.6) | 35.5 (95.9) | 32.3 (90.1) | 28.4 (83.1) | 22.6 (72.7) | 37.7 (99.9) |
| Mean daily maximum °C (°F) | 13.2 (55.8) | 13.7 (56.7) | 15.9 (60.6) | 19.0 (66.2) | 23.6 (74.5) | 27.6 (81.7) | 30.1 (86.2) | 30.4 (86.7) | 27.0 (80.6) | 23.0 (73.4) | 18.6 (65.5) | 14.4 (57.9) | 21.4 (70.5) |
| Mean daily minimum °C (°F) | 5.5 (41.9) | 5.9 (42.6) | 7.8 (46.0) | 10.5 (50.9) | 14.5 (58.1) | 18.4 (65.1) | 20.6 (69.1) | 21.0 (69.8) | 17.7 (63.9) | 14.1 (57.4) | 10.5 (50.9) | 7.0 (44.6) | 12.8 (55.0) |
| Record low °C (°F) | −7.2 (19.0) | −6 (21) | −5.5 (22.1) | 0.7 (33.3) | 4.7 (40.5) | 9.1 (48.4) | 12.2 (54.0) | 9.5 (49.1) | 7.9 (46.2) | −0.2 (31.6) | −2.4 (27.7) | −5.6 (21.9) | −7.2 (19.0) |
| Average precipitation mm (inches) | 142.1 (5.59) | 128.2 (5.05) | 130.7 (5.15) | 111.9 (4.41) | 81.5 (3.21) | 53.6 (2.11) | 32.0 (1.26) | 45.3 (1.78) | 134.0 (5.28) | 152.3 (6.00) | 164.6 (6.48) | 178.9 (7.04) | 1,355.1 (53.35) |
| Average precipitation days (≥ 1 mm) | 9.6 | 9.8 | 9.0 | 9.1 | 6.9 | 4.4 | 2.8 | 3.2 | 6.4 | 9.2 | 10.4 | 11.5 | 92.3 |
| Average relative humidity (%) | 65 | 64 | 67 | 71 | 73 | 72 | 68 | 69 | 70 | 68 | 69 | 68 | 69 |
| Mean monthly sunshine hours | 120.9 | 124.2 | 170.9 | 198.9 | 259.7 | 297.4 | 351.5 | 317.3 | 252.1 | 198.8 | 124.6 | 111.6 | 2,527.9 |
Source 1: National Oceanic and Atmospheric Administration
Source 2: Hydrological and Meteorological Service of Montenegro (humidity, sun 1961–1990)

=== Flora and fauna ===
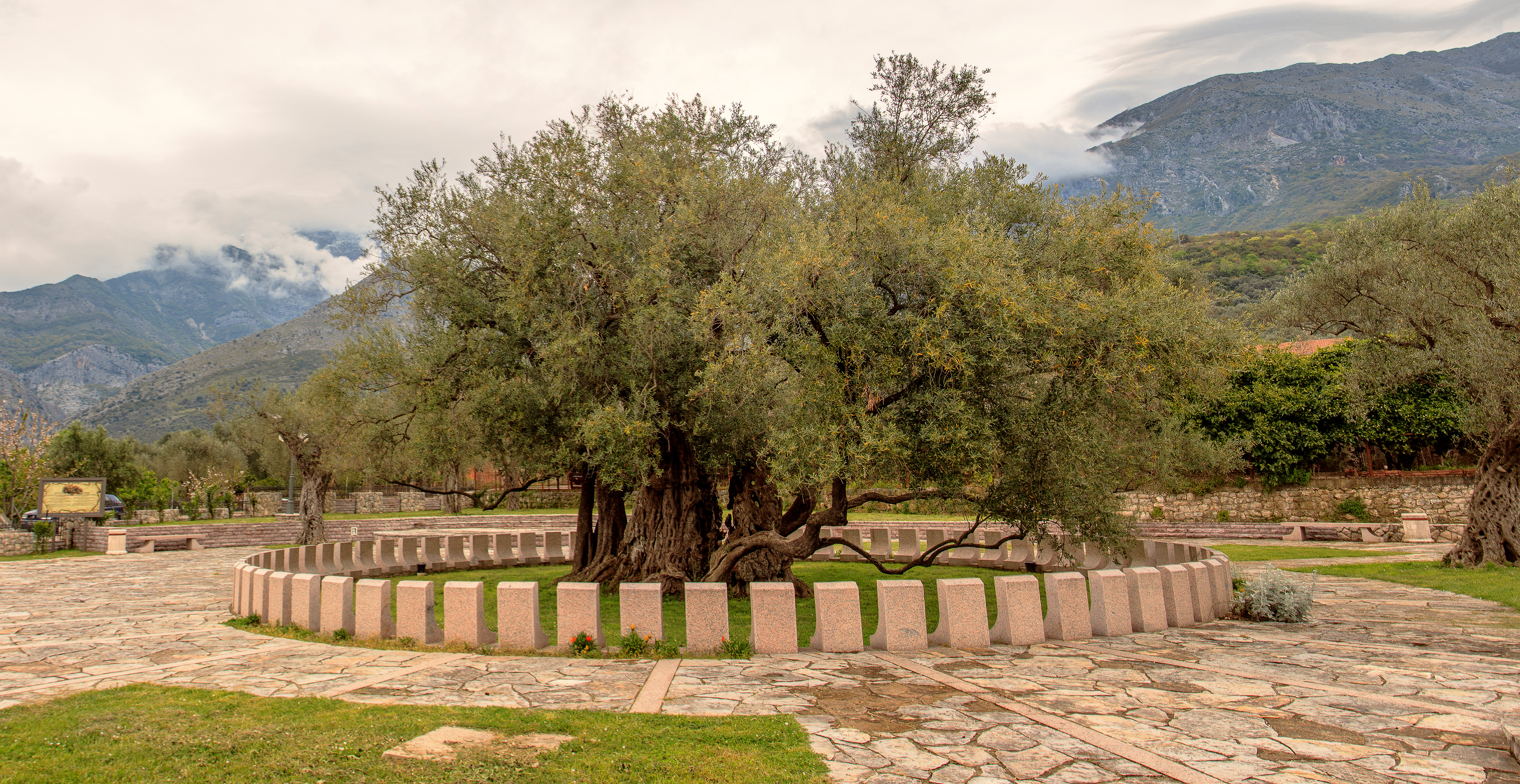
Olea europea, ancient olive tree

The coastal part of Bar supports maquis shrubland and Mediterranean vegetation, including evergreen oak, laurel, myrtle, oleander and other thermophilic species. The higher and northern parts of the municipality contain oak and beech forests. The Bar area also supports the cultivation of citrus fruits, pomegranates, olives, grapevines and figs. Skadar Lake is rich in bird life including the pelican. Game animals are found in Ostros, Rumija, Lisinj, Sutorman and Sozina and include rabbit, badger, fox, wolf and boar. At the Bar sea shore one finds various kinds of shells, snails, echinodermata, cephalopoda and crayfish.

== Demographics ==
Historical population
| Year | Pop. | ±% |
|---|---|---|
| 1948 | 897 | — |
| 1953 | 1,113 | +24.1% |
| 1961 | 2,184 | +96.2% |
| 1971 | 3,612 | +65.4% |
| 1981 | 6,742 | +86.7% |
| 1991 | 10,971 | +62.7% |
| 2003 | 13,719 | +25.0% |
| 2011 | 13,503 | −1.6% |
| 2023 | 15,868 | +17.5% |

Bar is the administrative centre of Bar Municipality, which includes the town of Sutomore and other small coastal towns. A census in 2023 recorded 46,171 people in the Bar Municipality. The town of Bar had 15,868 inhabitants.

=== Ethnicity ===
Ethnic composition of the town in 2011:

| Ethnicity | Number | Percentage |
|---|---|---|
| Montenegrins | 6,901 | 51.11% |
| Serbs | 4,487 | 33.23% |
| Bosniaks | 410 | 3.04% |
| Ethnic Muslims | 273 | 2.02% |
| Albanians | 121 | 0.89% |
| Croats | 121 | 0.89% |
| Other | 78 | 0.58% |
| Not declared | 787 | 5.82% |
| Total | 13,503 | 100% |

=== Religion ===
St Jovan Vladimir church

The main religion in Bar is Orthodox Christianity. However, there are churches from both the Eastern Orthodox and Catholic traditions as well as mosques built by Ottomans in the Islamic tradition. Bar is the birthplace of Saint Jovan Vladimir. In 1089, the Roman Catholic Archdiocese of Bar was founded and included most of Montenegro and Serbia.

| Religion | Number | Percentage |
|---|---|---|
| Eastern Orthodox | 10,499 | 77.7% |
| Islam | 1,433 | 10.6% |
| Roman Catholic | 745 | 5.5% |
| Atheist | 250 | 1.85% |
| Agnostic | 19 | 0.14% |
| Other | 59 | 0.4% |
| Undeclared | 459 | 3.3% |

== Economy ==
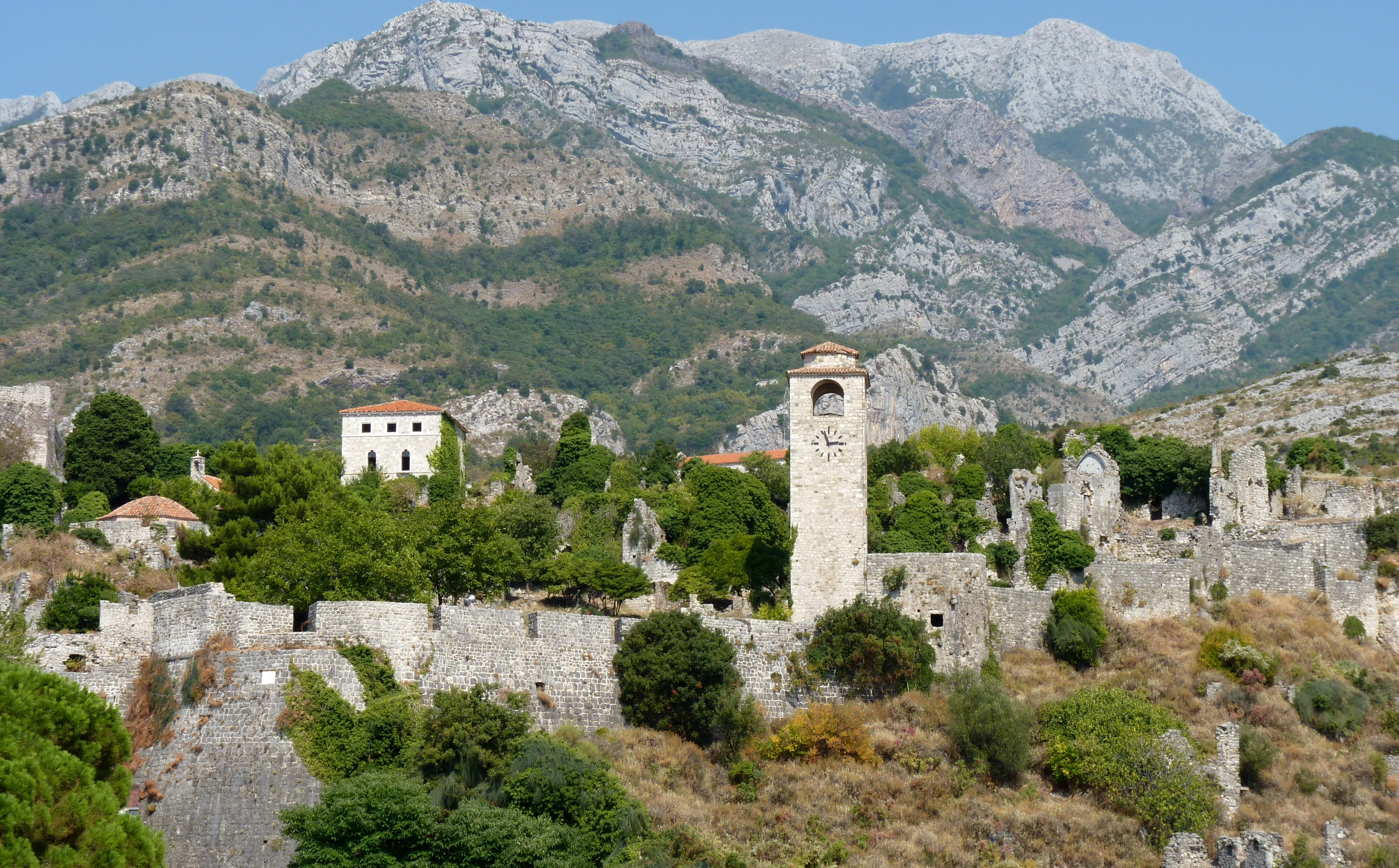
Stari Bar (the Old Town of Bar)

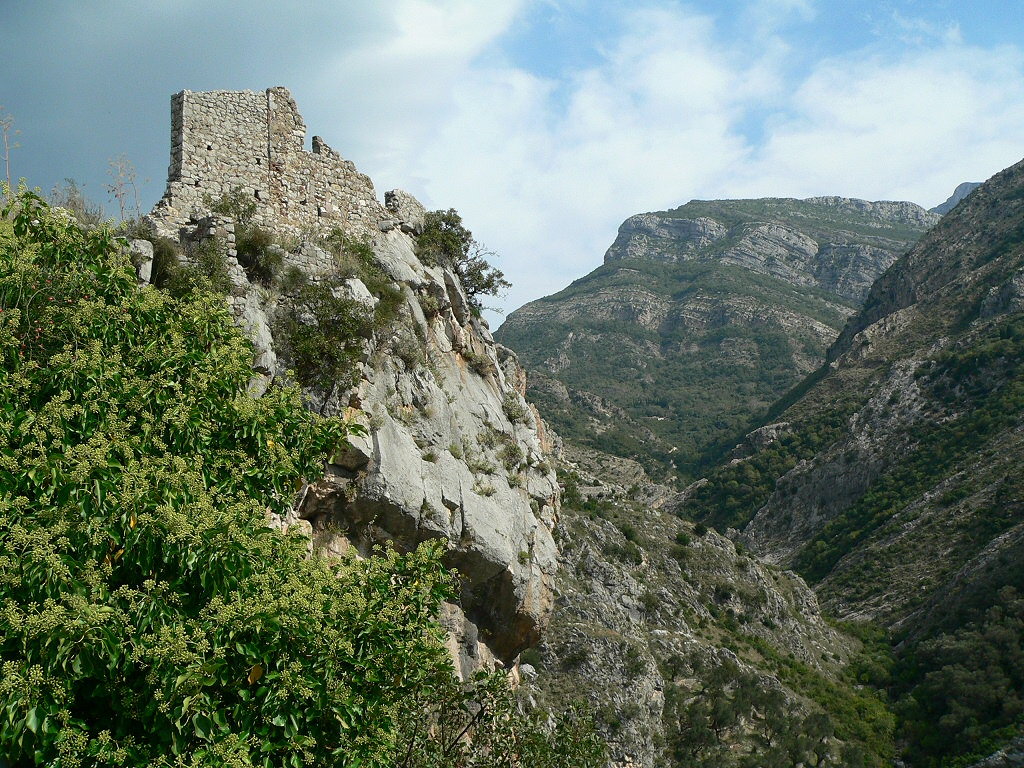
A fragment of the town walls of Stari Bar

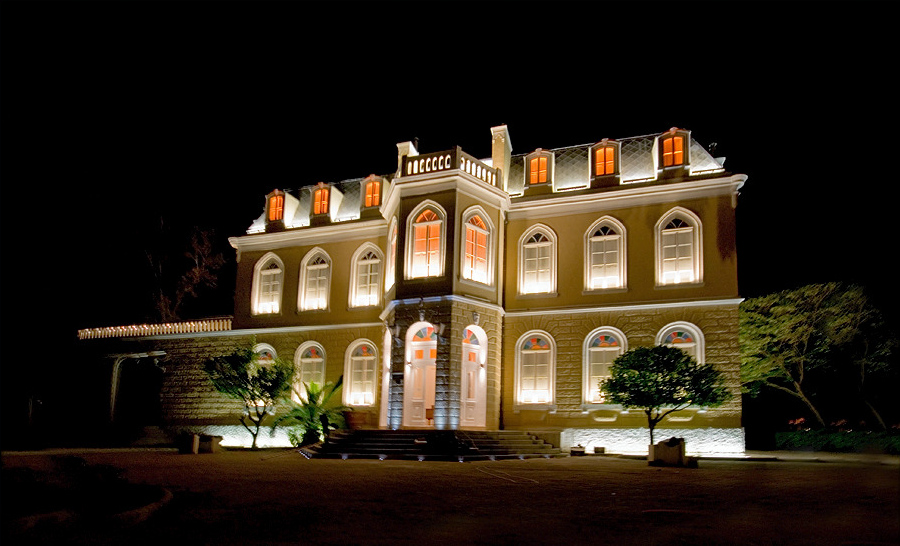
King Nikola's Palace

The economy of Bar relies upon the Port of Bar, the Belgrade–Bar railway and the Sozina tunnel. The Port of Bar is the most recognizable feature of the city. It occupies 3,100 m (10,170.60 ft) of seacoast, land area of 800 ha and aquatorium of 200ha. It is capable of reloading 5 million tons of goods annually. In 1976, the Belgrade – Bar railway was opened. It made the Adriatic coast accessible to tourists and transport to the Port of Bar. The food company, Primorka, has been operating in Bar for more than 50 years. It produces olive oil and pomegranate juice. There are 95,000 olive trees, about 80,000 citrus trees (lemon, orange, tangerine and grapefruit) in the municipal area. The centre for subtropical cultures, founded in 1937, is the oldest scientific institution in Montenegro. Tourism is also a major part of Bar's economy.

=== Transport ===
Bar has a ferry line to Bari, Italy, which is operated by Montenegro Lines. In season, ferries also go to Ancona, Italy. Bar is well connected with inland Montenegro, as well as with the rest of the Montenegrin coast. The Sozina tunnel, completed in 2006, shortened the road connection with Podgorica to around 50 km (31 mi). Bar is connected to other coastal towns by the Adriatic motorway, which extends from Ulcinj to Herceg Novi, and on to Croatia. Bar is also the final station of the Belgrade–Bar railway, which connects Bar with Podgorica, northern Montenegro and Serbia. Podgorica Airport is about 40 km (25 mi) from Bar. There are regular flights to Belgrade, Budapest, Zürich, Frankfurt, Ljubljana, London, Paris, Rome and Vienna. As well the Blueline bus company provides public bus service with the central city of Bar as well as near the city of Sutomore. There are also intercity buses as well as international buses such as Flexbus.

== Sport ==
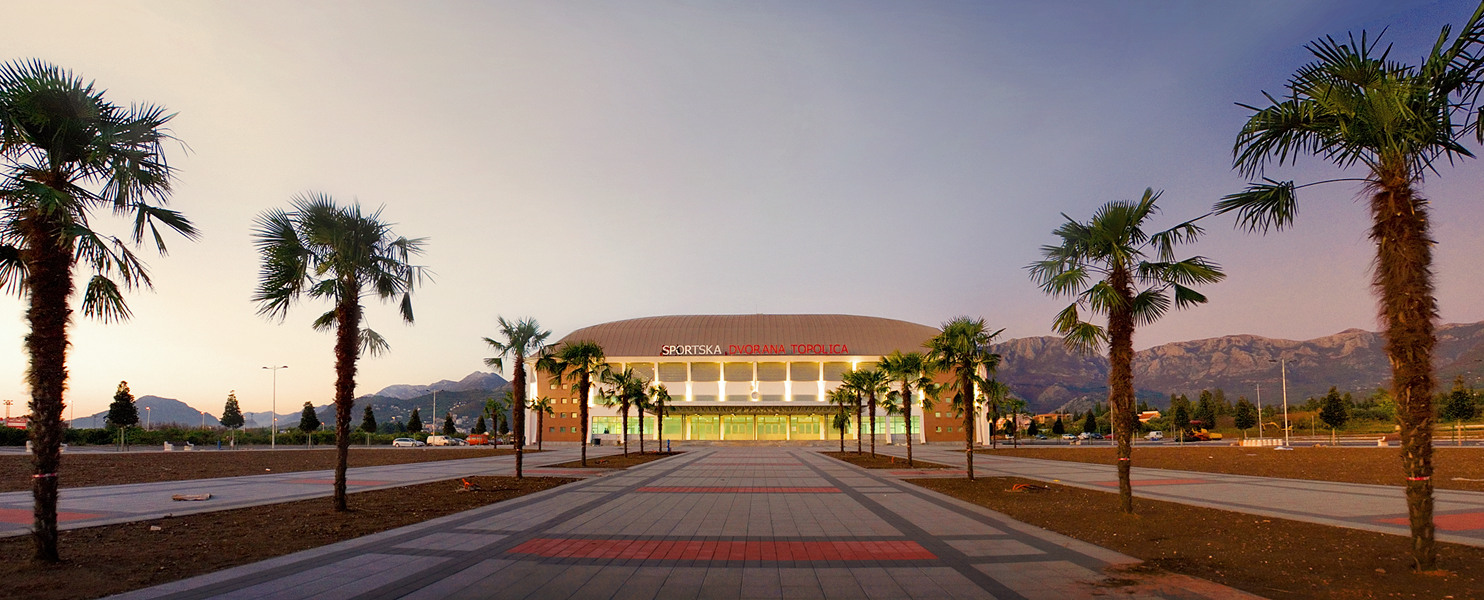
Indoor Topolica Sport Hall

Bar has over fifty sports clubs and associations, including a chess club. The town's major football club is FK Mornar, who share the Stadion Topolica with lower league sides FK Hajduk Bar and Stari Bar team FK Sloga Bar. Bar once had two teams in the top tier, with OFK Bar featuring in the 2010–11 season alongside FK Mornar. KK Mornar Bar is the local basketball club. There are numerous sports facilities in the Bar hotels and schools. In the centre of town, most of the facilities are in the Sports and Recreation Centre. Water sports such as diving are common. Sports tourism is promoted because of the proximity to the sea and lake. Bar hosted the 2010 FIBA Europe Under-16 Championship and the 2010 Men's U18 European Handball Championship.

== Twin towns – sister cities ==
Bar is twinned with:

- Adana, Turkey
- Bari, Italy
- Bor, Serbia
- Bornova, Turkey
- Cherepovets, Russia
- Corfu, Greece
- Elbasan, Albania
- Hongkou (Shanghai), China
- Küçükkuyu, Turkey
- Kula, Serbia
- Kursk, Russia
- Kragujevac, Serbia
- Mali Iđoš, Serbia
- Maribor, Slovenia
- Mariupol, Ukraine
- Ningbo, China
- Nuremberg, Germany
- Piaseczno, Poland
- Podolsk, Russia
- Požarevac, Serbia
- Resen, North Macedonia
- Vodnjan, Croatia
- Živinice, Bosnia and Herzegovina

== Sources ==
- Шишић, Фердо, ed. (1928). Летопис Попа Дукљанина (Chronicle of the Priest of Duklja). Београд-Загреб: Српска краљевска академија.
- Кунчер, Драгана (2009). Gesta Regum Sclavorum. Vol. 1. Београд-Никшић: Историјски институт, Манастир Острог.
- Живковић, Тибор (2009). Gesta Regum Sclavorum. Vol. 2. Београд-Никшић: Историјски институт, Манастир Острог.
- Vasić, Milan (2005). Naselja na Balkanskom Poluostrvu od XVI do XVIII Vijeka (in Serbian). Banja Luka: Narodna I Univerzitetska Biblioteka Republike Srpske. ISBN 99938-0-584-X.
