= List of islands of Montenegro =

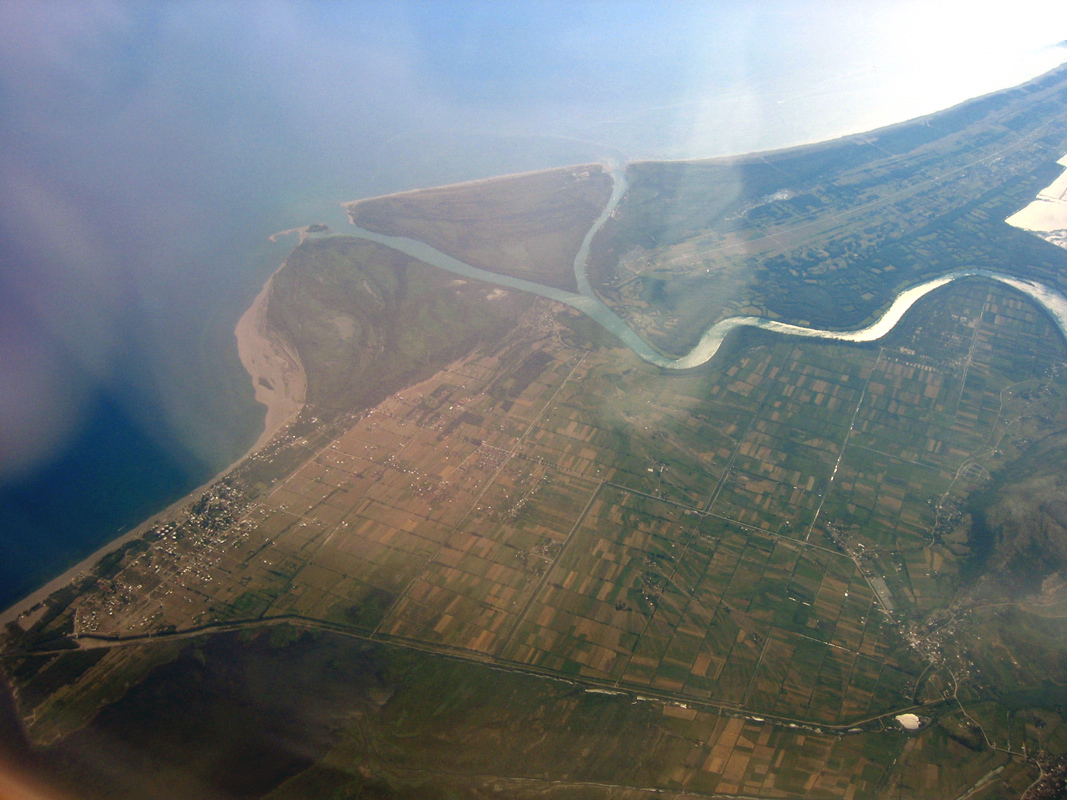
Ada Bojana

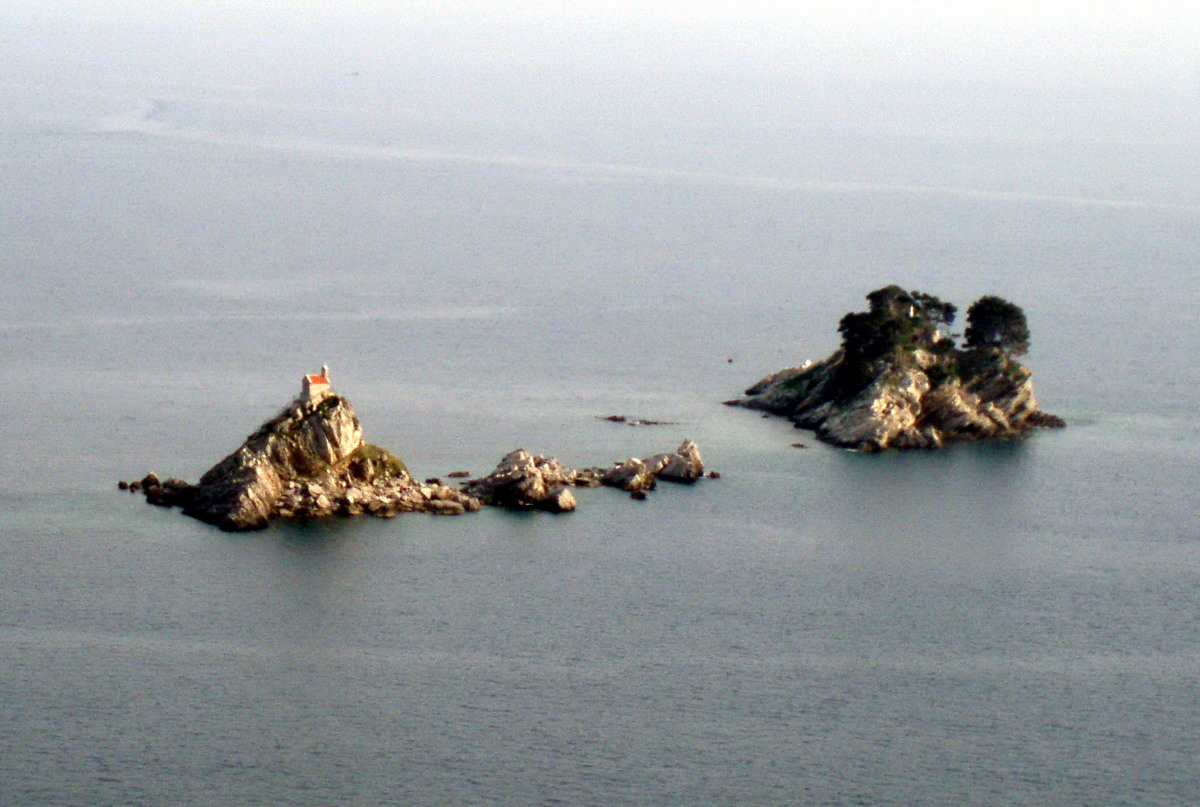
Katič and Sveta Neđelja

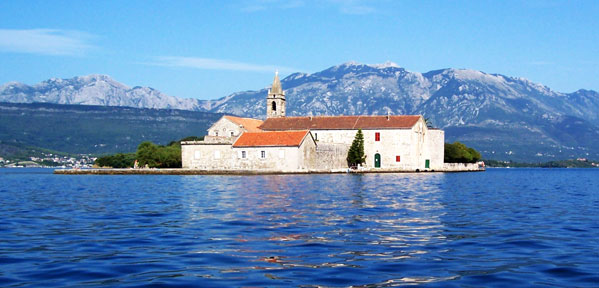
Gospa od Milosti

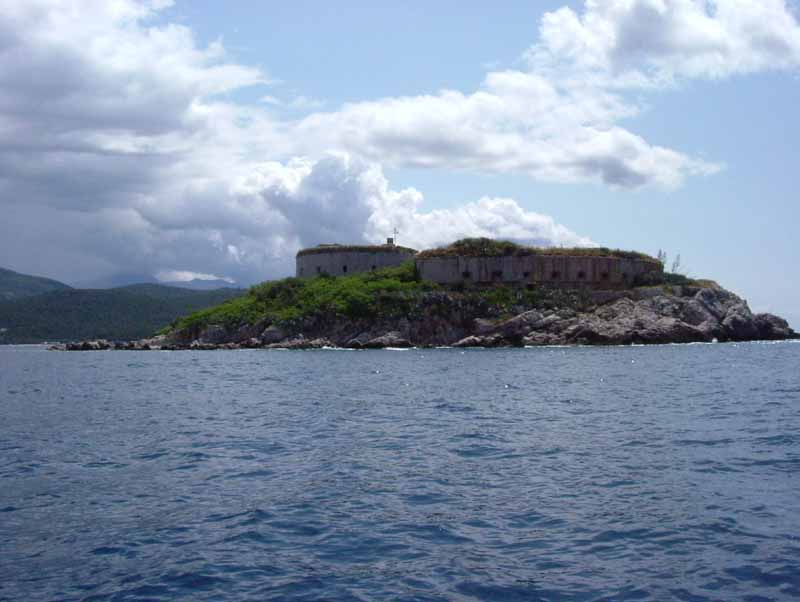
Mamula Island

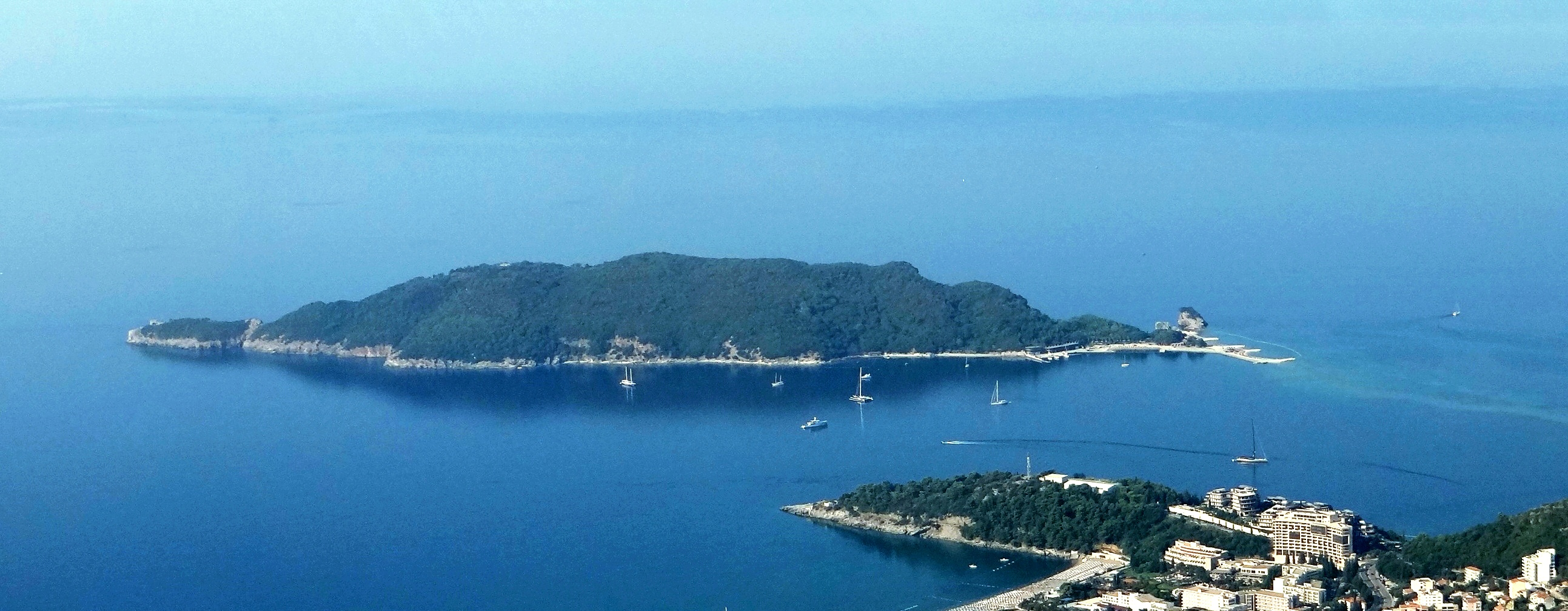
Sveti Nikola Island

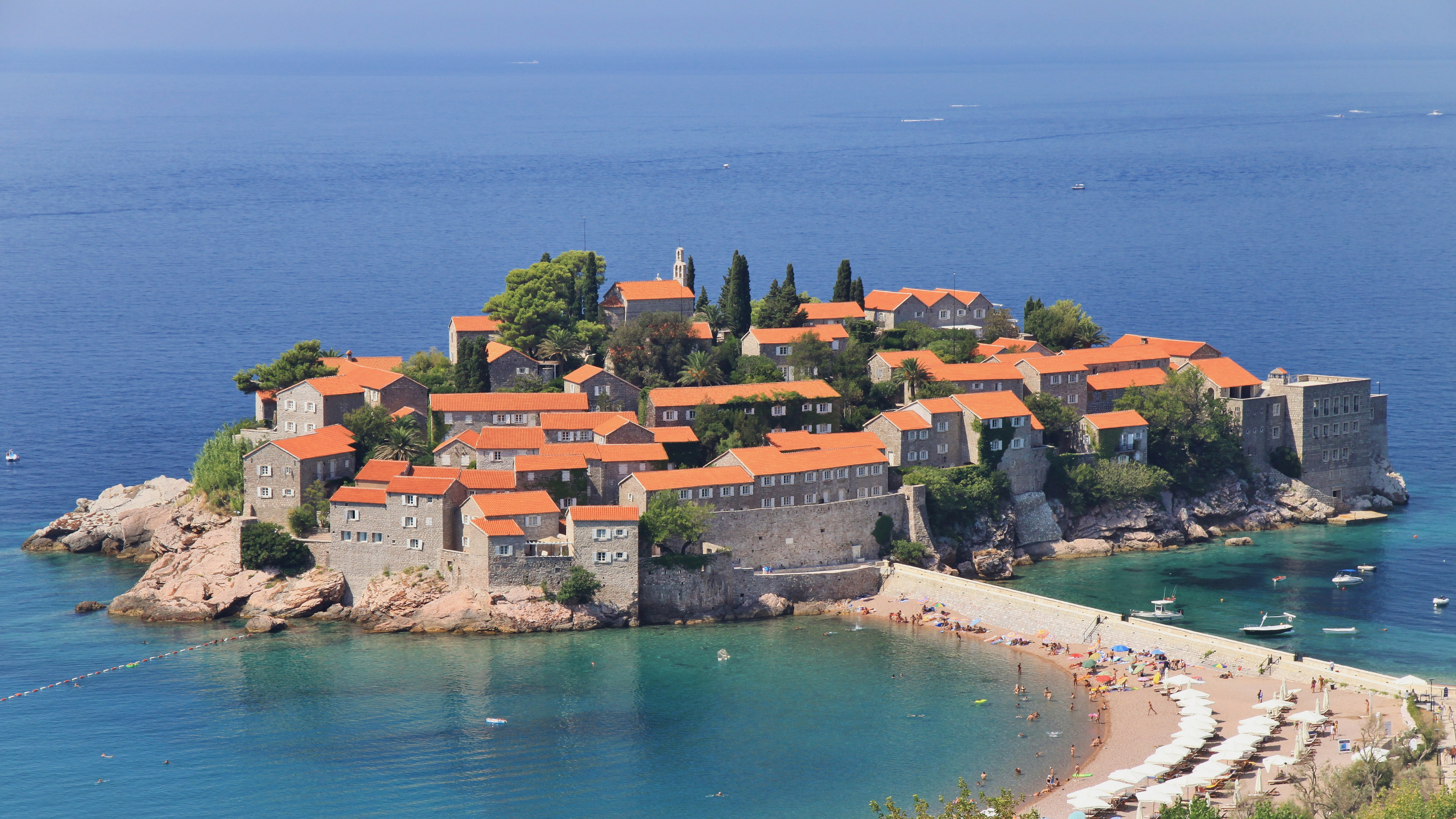
Sveti Stefan

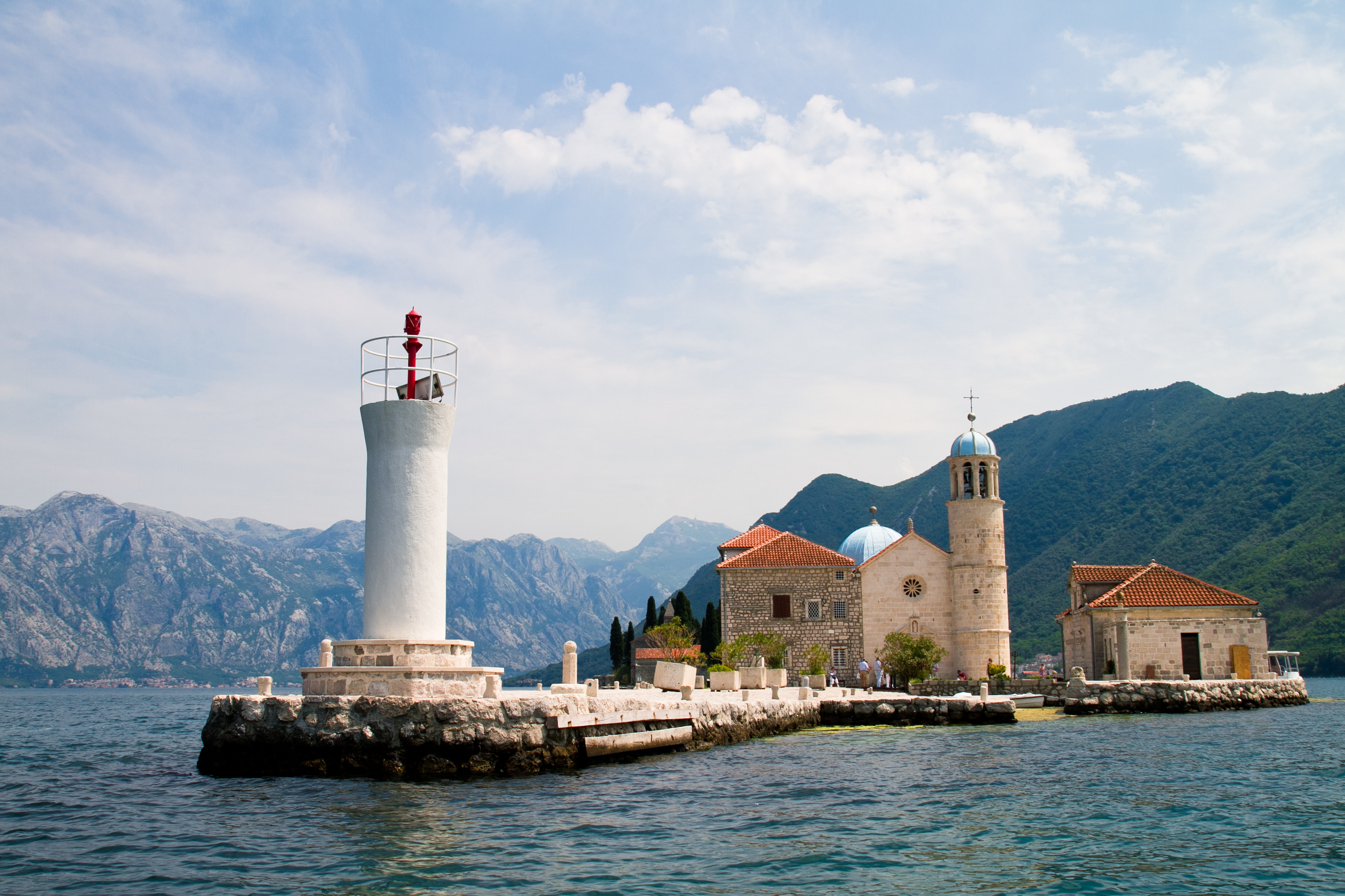
Our Lady of the Rocks

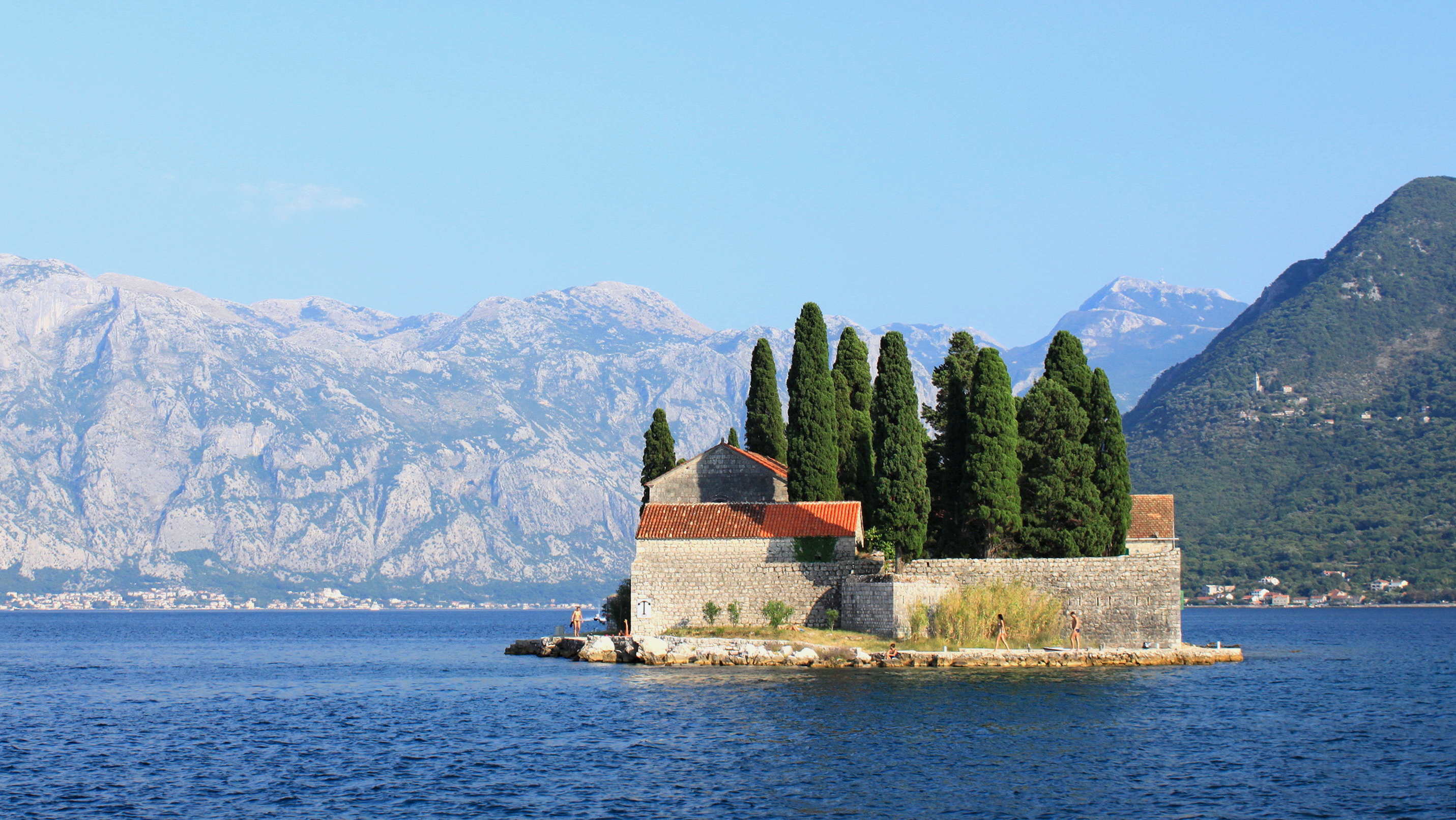
Sveti Đorđe

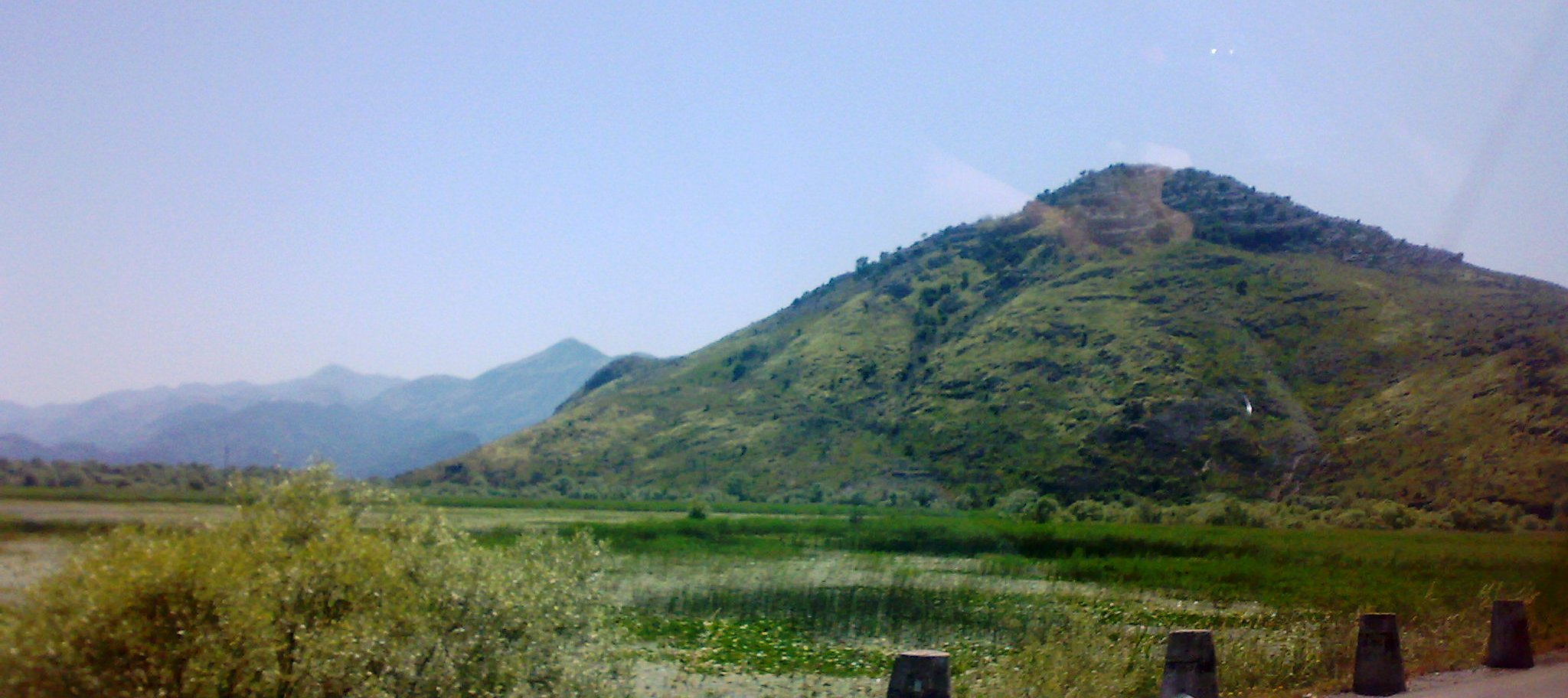
Vranjina

This is a list of islands of Montenegro. Montenegro's islands are relatively small and they are not as nearly as numerous as in neighbouring Croatia. They are divided in islands on Adriatic Sea, and those on Skadar lake:

== Adriatic Sea ==
- Ada Bojana
- Katič
- Mamula (former prison-island)
- Sveti Nikola
- Sveta Neđelja
- Sveti Stefan
- Stari Ulcinj
- Žanjic

Bay of Kotor

- Sveti Marko
- Gospa od Milosti
- Ostrvo cvijeća
- Gospa od Škrpjela
- Sveti Đorđe
- Školjic

== Lake Skadar ==
- Vranjina
- Grmožur (former prison-island)
- Lesendro
- Starčevo
- Kom
- Beška
- Moračnik
- Kamenik
- Liponjak
- Krajina archipelago

== List of islands by area ==
#	Island	Area (km^{2}), (ha)	Coordinates	Location
1	Ada Bojana	4.81 (481 ha)	41°51′N 19°21′E	Adriatic Sea
2	Vranjina	4.6 (460 ha)	42°16′40″N 19°08′20″E	Skadar Lake
3	Slansko Island	0.44 (44 ha)	42°45′32″N 18°50′30″E	Slano Lake
4	Sveti Nikola	0.36 (36 ha)	42°16′05″N 18°50′58″E	Adriatic Sea
5	Sveti Marko	0.32 (32 ha)	42°24′40″N 18°41′31″E	Bay of Kotor
6	Beška	0.15 (15 ha)	42°09′55″N 19°13′48″E	Skadar Lake
