= Bogdašići =

Bogdašići Богдашићи
- Village
- Location within Montenegro
- Coordinates: 42.427531°N 18.733284°E
- Country: Montenegro
- Region: Coastal
- Municipality: Tivat

Population (2011)
  - Total: 57
- Time zone: UTC+1 (CET)
  - Summer (DST): UTC+2 (CEST)

Bogdašići (Montenegrin: Богдашићи) is a small settlement in the municipality of Tivat, Montenegro. It is located east of Tivat.

== Demographics ==
According to the 2011 census, Bogdašići had a population of 57 people.

Ethnicity in 2011
Ethnicity	Number	Percentage
Croats	27	47.4%
Montenegrins	23	40.4%
other/undeclared	7	12.3%
Total	57	100%
