= Bogišići =

Bogišići Богишићи
- Village
- Location within Montenegro
- Coordinates: 42.396519°N 18.680832°E
- Country: Montenegro
- Region: Coastal
- Municipality: Tivat

Population (2011)
  - Total: 184
- Time zone: UTC+1 (CET)
  - Summer (DST): UTC+2 (CEST)

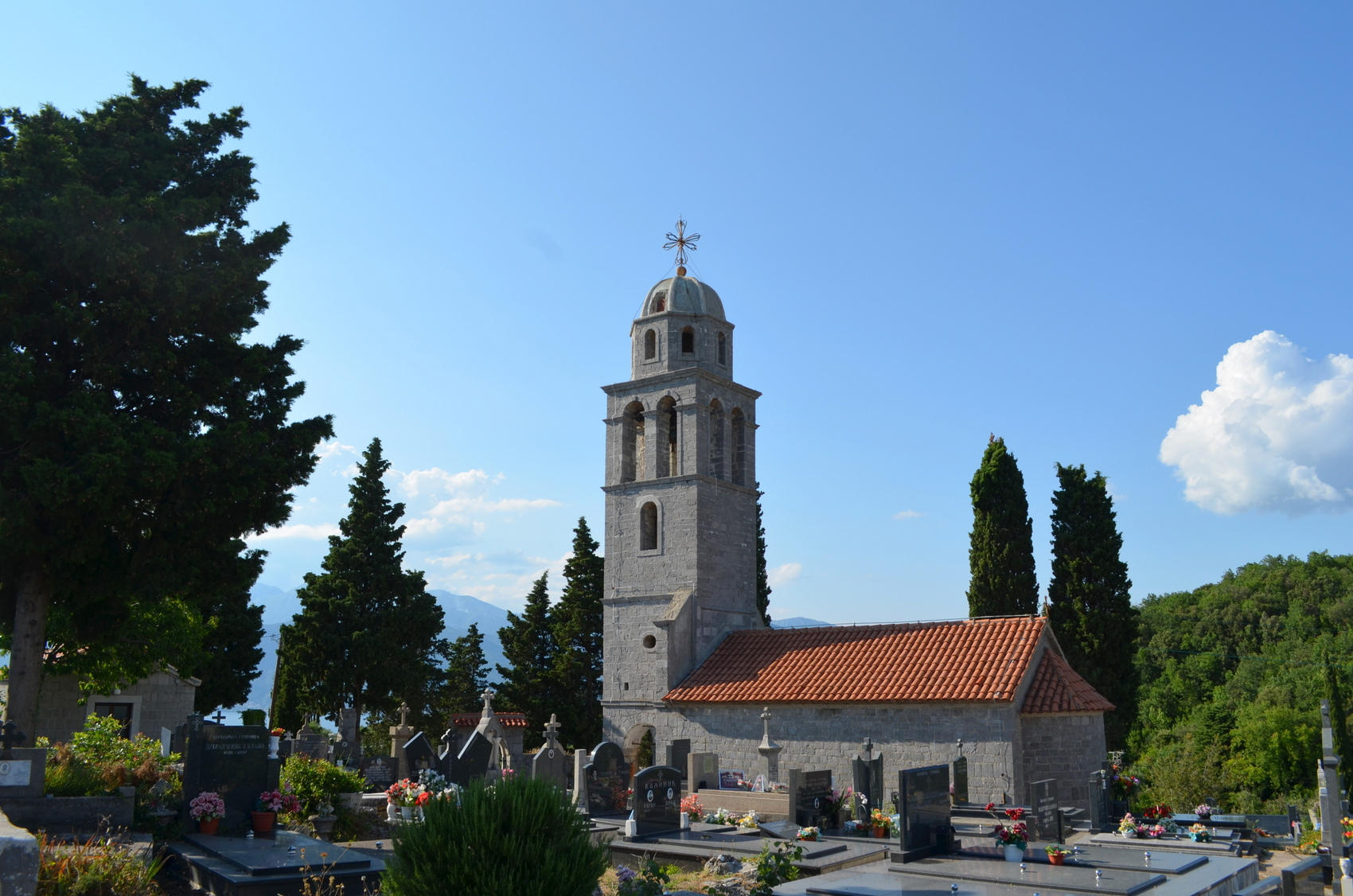
St. John's Church, Bogišići, Grbalj, Montenegro

Bogišići (Montenegrin: Богишићи) is a small settlement in the municipality of Tivat, Montenegro. It is located on the Luštica.

== Demographics ==
According to the 2011 census, it had a population of 184 people.

Ethnicity in 2011
Ethnicity	Number	Percentage
Serbs	79	42.9%
Montenegrins	34	18.5%
Croats	33	17.9%
other/undeclared	38	20.7%
Total	184	100%
