= Božo Nikolić =

Montenegrin politician (1946–2010)

Božo Nikolić (Serbian Cyrillic: Божо Николић; 22 September 1946 – 17 November 2010) was a Montenegrin Croat sea captain and politician from Montenegro, and one of the founders of Croatian Civic Initiative. He was a member of Croatian Confraternity Bokelj Navy 809.

Nikolić was born in Gornja Lastva in Tivat municipality, Bay of Kotor. With the Coalition for European Montenegro, he entered the Parliament of Montenegro in the 2006 elections. In doing so he became the first Croat minority representative to enter the Assembly. He died in 2010, at the age of 64.

== See also ==
- Croatian Confraternity Bokelj Navy 809.
