= Vrmac Tunnel =

Vehicular tunnel in Montenegro

Coordinates: 42°24′11″N 18°45′10″E

Vrmac Tunnel (Montenegrin: Tunel Vrmac) is a vehicular tunnel in southern Montenegro.

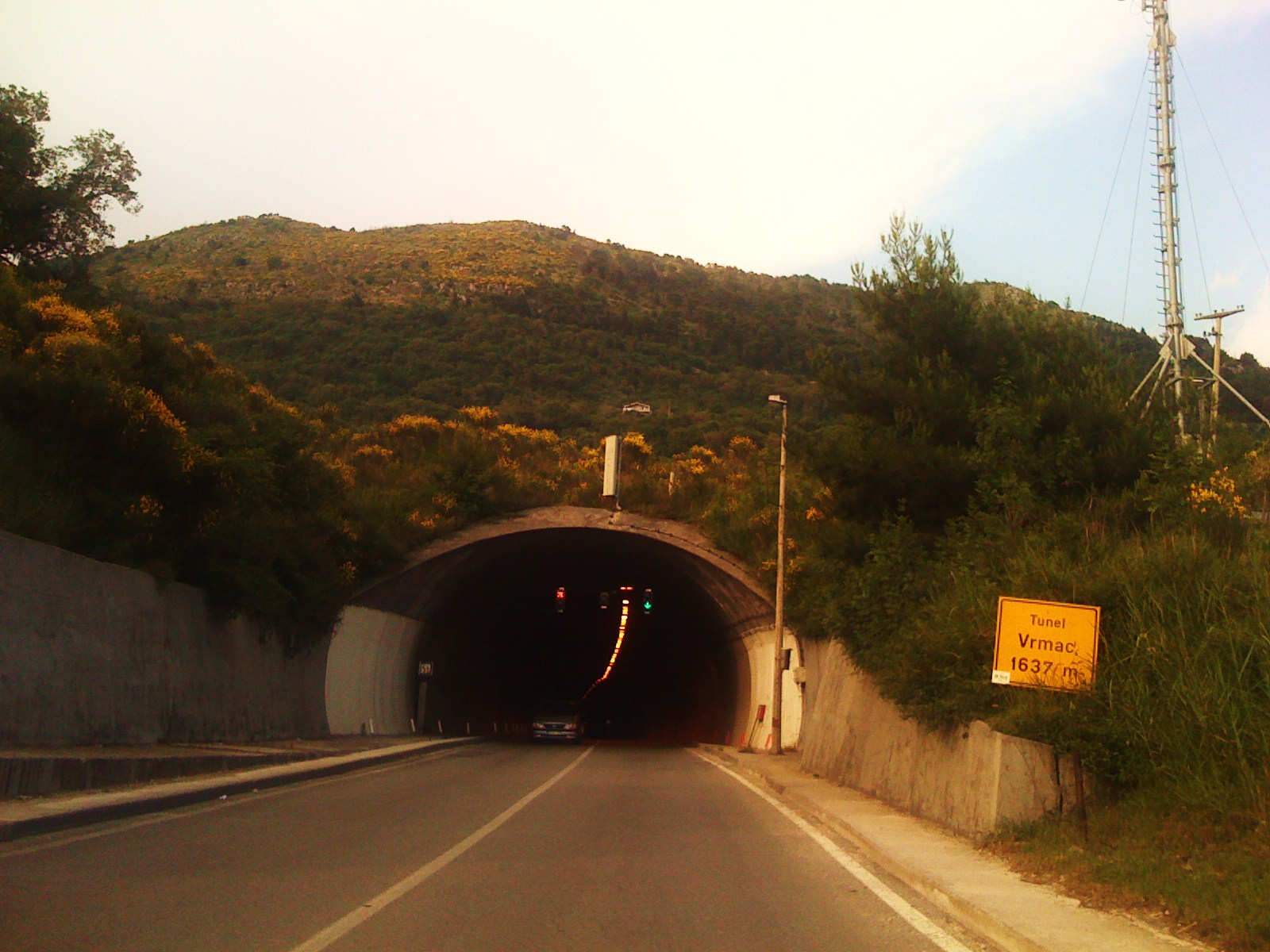
Entrance to the tunnel

The tunnel, which is 1,637 m long, connects the town of Kotor with the Adriatic Motorway and the rest of Montenegro. It passes under Mount Vrmac, thus eliminating the journey along the old curvy road that passes over the mountain.

The tunnel was half-finished in 1991, but was then opened to the public as it was, because of the lack of funding to finish it. In 2004 work began to finish the tunnel, and to bring it up to European standards. The construction, undertaken by Austrian company Strabag, was completed early in 2007, and the tunnel is now equipped with up-to-date lighting, ventilation and security systems.

== See also ==
- Vrmac
- Fort Vrmac
