= Gornja Lastva =

Gornja Lastva Gornja Lastva
- Village
- Location within Montenegro
- Coordinates: 42.453417°N 18.707301°E
- Country: Montenegro
- Region: Coastal
- Municipality: Tivat
- Time zone: UTC+1 (CET)
  - Summer (DST): UTC+2 (CEST)

Gornja Lastva (Montenegrin: Gornja Lastva) is a small settlement in the municipality of Tivat, Montenegro. It is located east of Tivat.

== Demographics ==
According to the 2011 census, it had an unknown population.
