= Donja Lastva =

Donja Lastva Donja Lastva
- Town
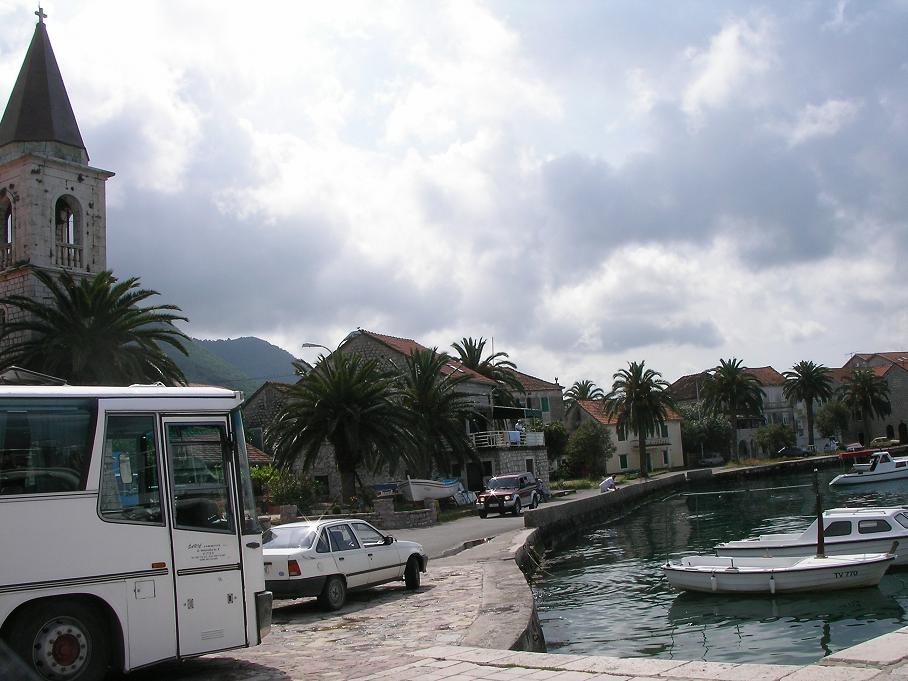

- Location within Montenegro
- Country: Montenegro
- Region: Coastal
- Municipality: Tivat
- Elevation: 0 m (0 ft)

Population (2011)
  - Total: 751
- Time zone: UTC+1 (CET)
  - Summer (DST): UTC+2 (CEST)
- Postal code: 85320
- Area code: +382 32

Donja Lastva (Montenegrin: Donja Lastva) is a coastal settlement in the municipality of Tivat, Montenegro. It is also located north of Tivat in the Bay of Kotor.

== Demographics ==
According to the 2011 census, it had a population of 751 people.

Ethnicity in 2011
Ethnicity	Number	Percentage
Croats	315	41.9%
Montenegrins	232	30.9%
Serbs	122	16.3%
other/undeclared	82	10.9%
Total	751	100%
