= Gospa od Milosti =

Coordinates: 42°24′39″N 18°40′42″E

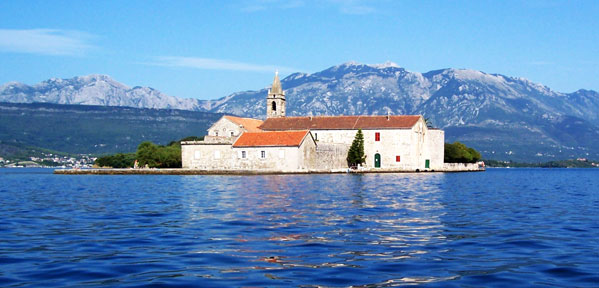
View of Our Lady of Mercy Island

The Our Lady of Mercy (Montenegrin: Gospa od Milosti/Госпа од Милости), also known as Our Lady of Grace, is one of three islands in a unique series of islands near town of Tivat in the Bay of Kotor region of southwestern Montenegro.

It is located in front of the largest island of the Bay, Sveti Marko Island. The island is about 160 meters long and sixty meters wide. It is about 800 meters away from the coast of Tivat. On the island there is a "Church of Our Lady of Grace", dedicated to the Immaculate Conception of the Virgin Mary, and also one more building.

The spacious church and monastery were built in the second half of the 15th century, where the priests who wanted to live away from the world first settled. Franciscans moved into the monastery in 1524 and operated there until 1800 when they left the island. The bishop of Kotor appoints two priests to guard the church and take over the administration of the parish.
