= Croats of Montenegro =

Croats of Montenegro Hrvati u Crnoj Gori Хрвати у Црној Гори
- Croat minority flag in Montenegro

Total population
- 5,150 (2023 census)

Regions with significant populations
- Tivat Municipality (12.01%); Kotor Municipality (5.73%); Herceg Novi Municipality (1.66%)

Languages
- Croatian, Montenegrin

Religion
- Roman Catholicism

Related ethnic groups
- Other South Slavs

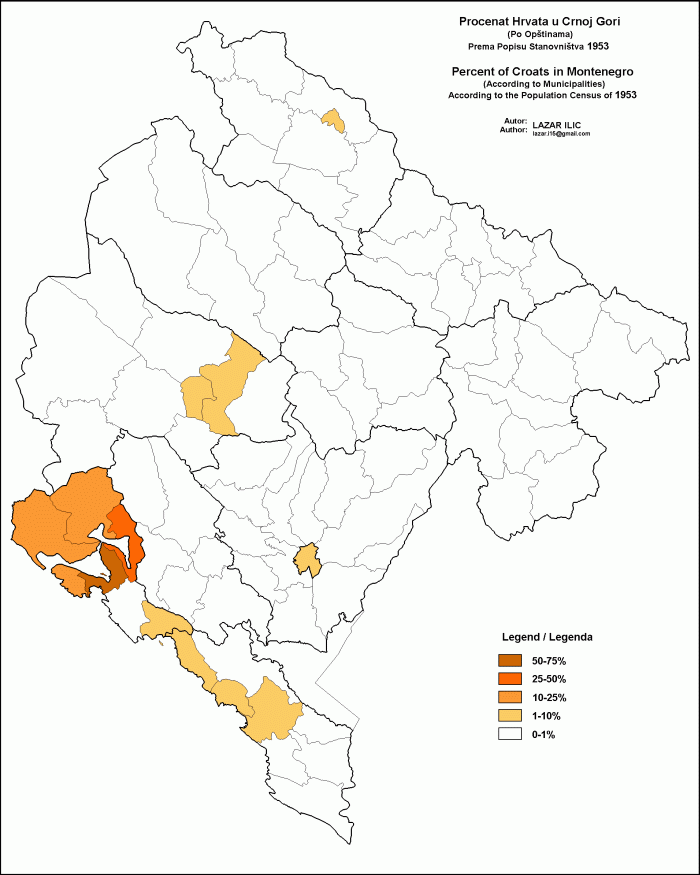
Percent of Croats in municipalities of Montenegro in 1953

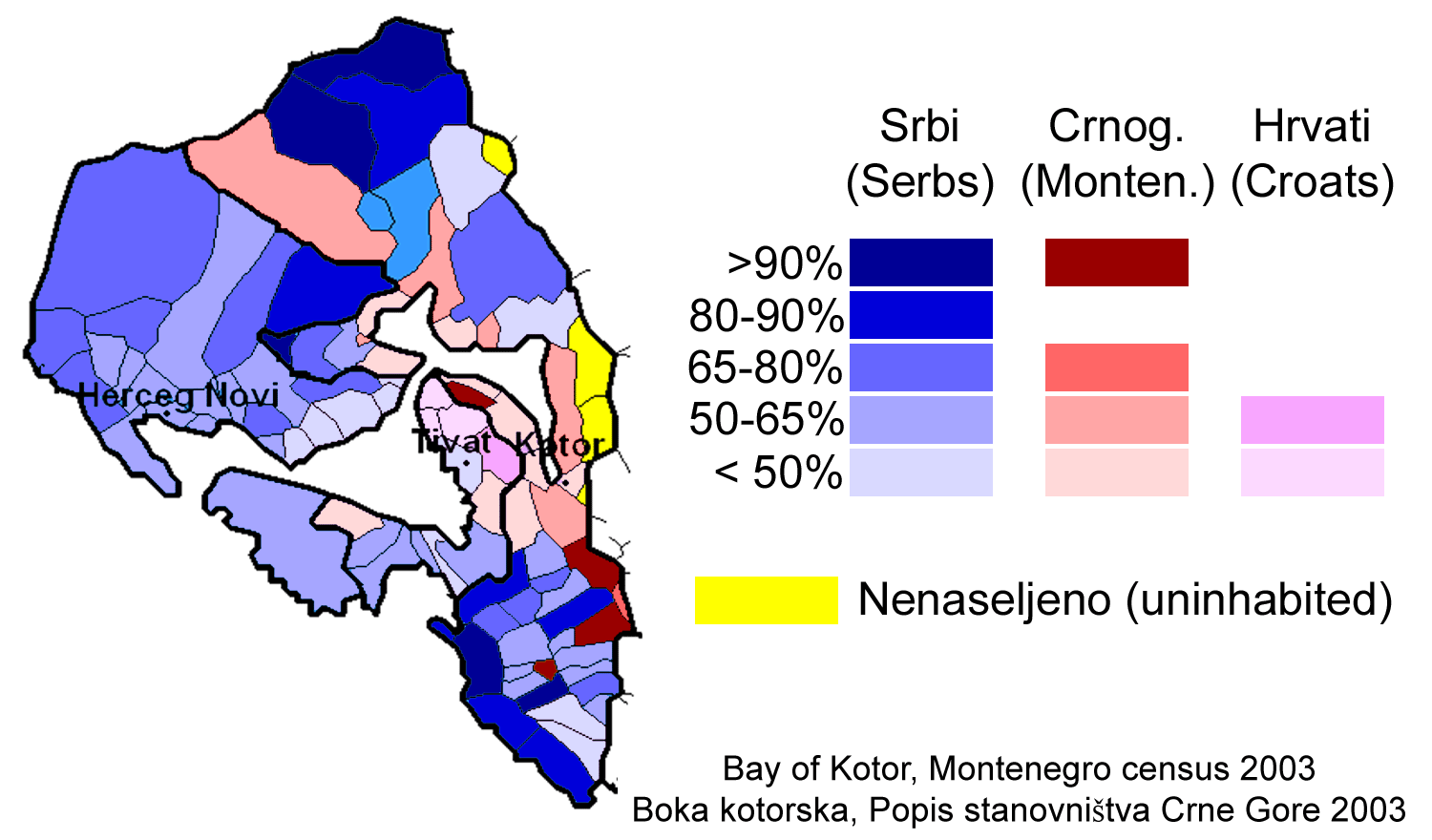
Ethnic composition of three Boka municipalities in 2003

The Croats have a minority in Boka Kotorska (Bay of Kotor), a coastal region in Montenegro, the largest of their kind in Tivat. The three municipalities making up the Bay of Kotor (Tivat, Kotor and Herceg-Novi) include 4,519 Croats or 6.70%. They are also known as Bokelji, a common name for all inhabitants of Boka Kotorska. Tivat is home to the minority political party Croatian Civic Initiative, and to the National Council of Croats in Montenegro. Kotor is home to Croatian Civic Society of Montenegro.

== Religion ==
Croats of Montenegro are mainly Catholic. According to the 2011 census, 5,527 (91.80%) Croats declared as such. Since most of them live in the Bay of Kotor, the vast majority of them fall under the Diocese of Kotor.

Places of worship

- Our Lady of the Rocks
- Cathedral of Saint Tryphon

== Demographics ==
Settlements in Montenegro with significant Croatian minority (10 percent or more) include (2011):

- Bogdašići (27 or 47,37%)
- Donja Lastva (315 or 41,94%)
- Lepetani (53 or 28,80%)
- Strp (12 or 24%)
- Krašići (27 or 20,77%)
- Muo (115 or 18,58%)
- Bogišići (33 or 17,93%)
- Tivat (1,622 or 17,31%)
- Donji Stoliv (58 or 16,67%)
- Prčanj (170 or 15,04%)
- Kavač (93 or 13,86%)
- Kotor (113 or 11,76%)
- Škaljari (415 or 10,90%)

Census year
| Municipality | Number of Croats | Percentage |
|---|---|---|
1961
| Herceg-Novi | 1,544 | 10.18% |
| Kotor | 3,483 | 20.92% |
| Tivat | 3,423 | 57.29% |
1971
| Herceg-Novi | 1,195 | 6.5% |
| Kotor | 2,612 | 13.8% |
| Tivat | 3,375 | 48.73% |
1981
| Herceg-Novi | 702 | 3.01% |
| Kotor | 1,644 | 8.03% |
| Tivat | 2,876 | 30.87% |
1991
| Herceg-Novi | 630 | 2.28% |
| Kotor | 1,617 | 7.2% |
| Tivat | 2,663 | 23.35% |
2003
| Herceg-Novi | 831 | 2.45% |
| Kotor | 1,842 | 7.84% |
| Tivat | 2,761 | 19.73% |
2011
| Herceg-Novi | 662 | 2.14% |
| Kotor | 1,553 | 7.84% |
| Tivat | 2,304 | 16.42% |

== Political representation ==
The Croatian Civic Society of Montenegro (Croatian: Hrvatsko građansko društvo Crne Gore) is a Croat community organisation in Montenegro. Their headquarters is located in the coastal town of Kotor, in the Boka Kotorska region of Montenegro. Additionally, the Croatian Civic Initiative based in Tivat is the main political party representing the Montenegrin Croats.

== Notable people ==
- Marta Batinović, Montenegrin handball player
- Tihomil Beritić, physician
- Ivan Brkanović, writer
- Tomislav Crnković, Croatian football player
- Ilija Janjić, Bishop
- Leopold Mandić, Catholic saint
- Andrija Maurović, comic book author
- Nikola Modruški, Bishop of Modruš
- Božo Nikolić, sea captain and politician
- Josip Pečarić, mathematician
- Matea Pletikosić, Montenegrin handball player
- Milan Sijerković, meteorologists
- Viktor Vida, writer
- Marija Vučinović, politician
- Predrag Vušović, actor

== See also ==
- Croatia–Montenegro relations
- Croatian diaspora
- Ethnic groups in Montenegro
- Croatian Confraternity Bokelj Navy 809.
- Montenegrins of Croatia
