= Croatian Confraternity Bokelj Navy 809. =

Non-profit association

Croatian Confraternity Bokelj Navy 809
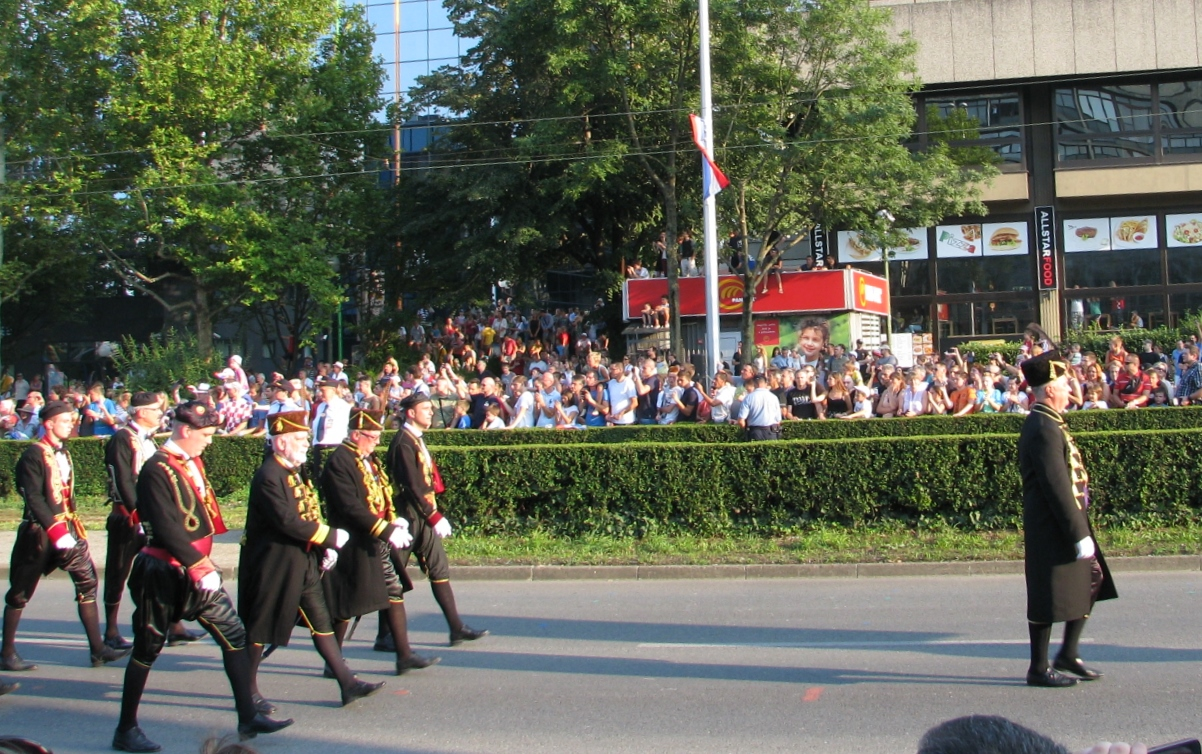
- Bokelj Navy 809. members on a military parade in Zagreb
- Founded: 1924
- Type: Public association
- Purpose: Preservation of the Bokelj Navy tradition
- Headquarters: Zagreb
- Location: Croatia
- Key people: Ivo Škanata, gastald (superintendent)
- Website: bokeljska-mornarica.hr

Croatian Confraternity Bokelj Navy 809 [bǒkeʎ] (Croatian: Hrvatska bratovština Bokeljska mornarica 809.) is a non-profit association which was established in 1924 in Zagreb. It preserves the twelve century-long tradition of the Bokeljs, people originating from Boka Kotorska (the Bay of Kotor). The Bokeljs lived along the bay under various authorities over the centuries, some of which were: the Byzantine Empire, the Kingdom of Duklja (Dioclea), the Serbian Empire, the Kingdom of Croatia-Hungary, the Kingdom of Bosnia, the Republic of Venice, the Habsburg Empire, Yugoslavia, and Montenegro). They were famous seamen, naval heroes and explorers. Their members include Krsto Čorko, Tripun Luković, Petar Želalić and Božo Nikolić.

The Confraternity is based in Zagreb, with several subsidiaries across Croatia, including Zadar, Rijeka, Pula, Split and Dubrovnik). It regularly cooperates with the Bokelj Navy organization in Kotor, Montenegro. It organizes socio-cultural events, the most important of which is The Day of Saint Tryphon. This celebrates the Town of Kotor's patron saint and protector of Kotor Cathedral. Members of the Confraternity often take part in events organized by the association of Croatian historical reenactment units.

The head of the Confraternity is called gastald, meaning superintendent or steward. Next to him there are three procurators and two syndics. The gastald as of 2018 is Ivo Škanata. Military components of Bokelj Navy 809. are led by the admiral, followed in descending order by the vice admiral, the major, the first captain, the second captain, the first lieutenant, the second lieutenant and the sergeant.

== See also ==
- History of the Croatian Navy
- History of Dalmatia
- Illyrian Provinces
- Croats of Montenegro
- History of Croatia
- History of Montenegro
- History of the Byzantine Empire
- History of the Republic of Venice
