= Vrmac =

Mountain in Montenegro

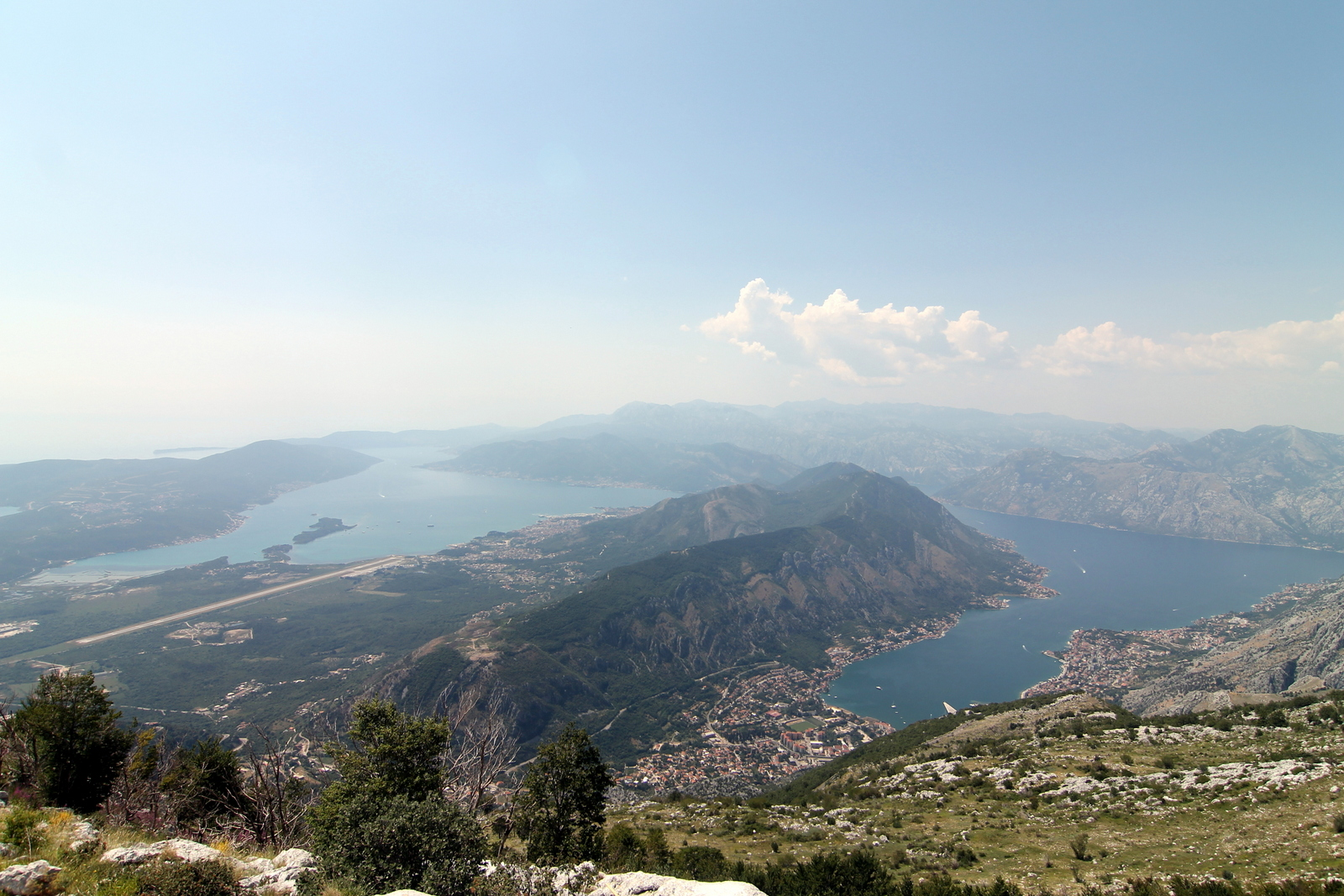
- Vrmac (central), as observed from Mount Lovćen

Highest point
- Elevation: 785 m (2,575 ft)
- Coordinates: 42°26′56″N 18°43′41″E

Geography
- Location within Montenegro
- Location: Montenegro
- Parent range: Lovćen

Vrmac (Montenegrin Cyrillic: Врмац) is a mountain in southwestern Montenegro overlooking the coastal town of Tivat, and a peninsula dividing Tivat Bay from Kotor Bay.

It is an extension of Mount Lovćen, and its highest peak is Sveti Ilija (Saint Elijah), which is 785 meters high. It is located to the northeast of town of Tivat, and encloses the town of Kotor from the southwest. It is also the site of the Austro-Hungarian Fort Vrmac, built in 1860.

Vrmac Tunnel, which connects Kotor with the Adriatic Highway, goes through the mountain. Vrmac is a popular destination for hiking, orienteering and mountain biking.

Under Vrmac there lie settlements like: Kotor,Kavač,Muo,Prčanj,Donji Stoliv and Gornji Stoliv on the Kotor side and on Tivat's side there is a town of Tivat and many more settlements.

== See also ==
- Fort Vrmac
- Vrmac Tunnel
