= Tihomil Beritić =

Croatian physician (1919–1999)

Tihomil Beritić (24 June 1919 – 6 April 1999) was a Croatian physician. Born in Herceg Novi, he graduated from the School of Medicine, University of Zagreb in 1943, where he obtained his Ph.D. in 1980. His research focus was hematology and toxicology. He spent most of his career at the Institute for Medical Research and Occupational Health in Zagreb as the founder and head of the Occupational Disease Department. He was also a long-time editor of the professional journals Liječnički vjesnik and Arhiv za higijenu rada i toksikologiju.

Beritić was primarily engaged in toxicology research of heavy metals, especially lead poisoning. He studied the effects of lead poisoning on the nervous system and kidneys, as well as therapeutic treatments for lead poisoning.

He proved that lead neuropathy is a motor neuron disease. Beritić was a full member of the Croatian Academy of Sciences and Arts, and the chairman of its Allergology Committee. He was an honorary president of the Croatian Toxicological Society.

Beritić and his mother, Djina-Gertruda, were named among the Righteous among the Nations in 1994 for having sheltered a Jewish child during World War II.
