= Katič and Sveta Neđelja Islets =

Coordinates: 42.197°N 18.936°E

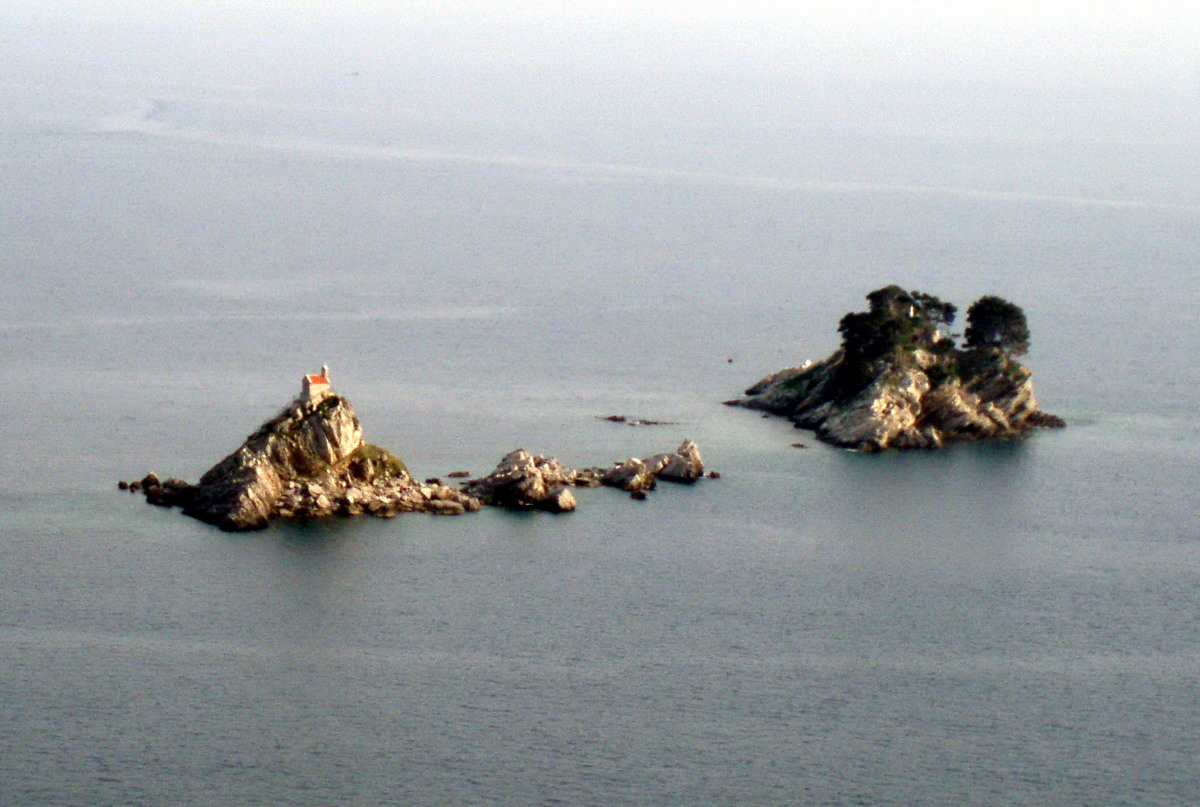
Katič and Sveta Neđelja Islets

Katič (Montenegrin: Катич) and Sveta Neđelja (Montenegrin: Света Неђеља) are two small islets on the Adriatic Sea, located opposite of the town of Petrovac in the Montenegrin municipality of Budva.

The Sveta Neđelja islet has a small church of the same name built upon it, and coupled with the Katič islet, makes an attraction for diving enthusiasts.

== Geography ==
Because the islets are virtually in the same straight line perpendicular to the coast, only one is visible from Petrovac city beach.

=== Katič ===
The inhabited island of Katič is about 0.9 km from the mainland. The island is small, with a surface-area of 0.010 km^{2}. Its total coastal length is about 0.7 km and the dimensions of the island are approximately 0.20 km by 0.10 km (maximum width). The island is West - East oriented with coordinates (latitude, longitude) of the island's center at 42°11'45.780", 18°56'8.4840".

=== Sveta Neđelja ===
Sveta Nedelya Island is closer to the Petrovac city beach than Katič, and is about 0.7km from the mainland. Sveta Neđelja is distinguished by a small, iconic church with the same name as the island.

Similarly small with a surface-area of 0.010 km^{2}, its total coastal length is about 0.8 km and the dimensions of the island are approximately 0.20 km by 0.10 km (maximum width). The island is West-southwest - East-northeast oriented with coordinates (latitude, longitude) of the island's center at 42°11'51.2160", 18°56'9.9960".

== See also ==
- Vlada Katic (born 1989), Israeli-Uzbekistani tennis player
