= Island of Flowers =

Island in Montenegro

Coordinates: 42.4058°N 18.7042°E

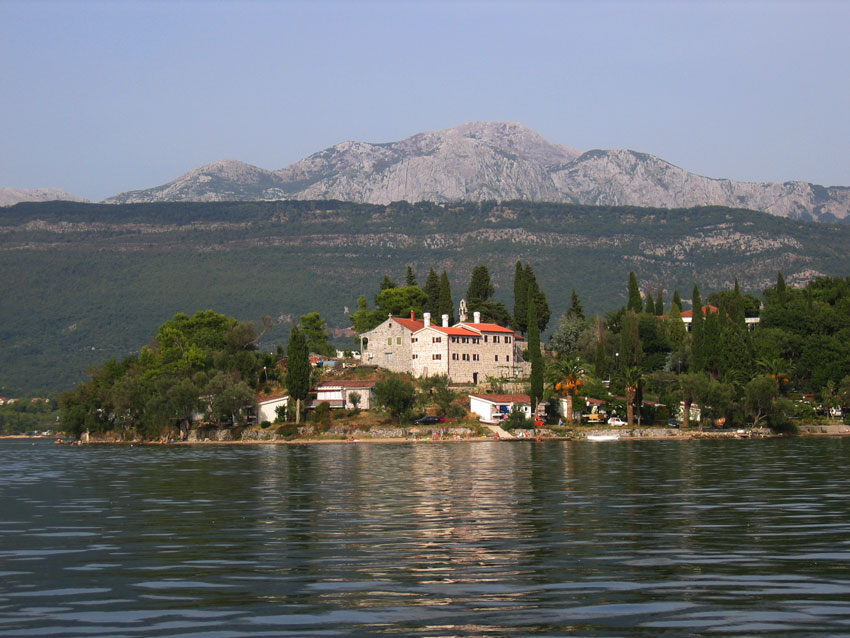
View of the island from the sea

The Island of Flowers (Montenegrin: Ostrvo cvijeća/Острво цвијећа), also known as Miholjska Prevlaka (Montenegrin: Михољска превлака, romanized: Miholjska prevlaka), or Island of St. Archangel Michael (Montenegrin: Острво Свети Михаило, romanized: Ostrvo Sveti Mihailo), is an island in the Tivat municipality in the Bay of Kotor, on the Montenegrin Littoral. It has population of 100 people. The Island of Flowers is located near the town of Tivat, in the Bay of Kotor. The island is 300 m long and 200 m wide. It is connected with the mainland by a narrow isthmus. Today, the island is inhabited by about a hundred people, mainly living in bungalows.

The island includes a monastery dedicated to Archangel Michael, built in the early 13th century by Saint Sava, the medieval seat of the Metropolitanate of Montenegro. It was a tourist resort for Yugoslav military personnel, closed for the general public in the Socialist Yugoslavia period.

== History ==
In the Middle Ages the two adjacent islands, Island of Flowers and Sveti Marko Island, were named islands of Sveti Mihailo and Sveti Gavrilo respectively, after the two holy archangels. After the Montenegrin littoral became part of the Venetian Republic, both islands were renamed. Sveti Mihailo Island became Miholjska Prevlaka, while Sveti Gavrilo Island became first named Stradioti, then Sveti Marko Island.

== Monastery ==
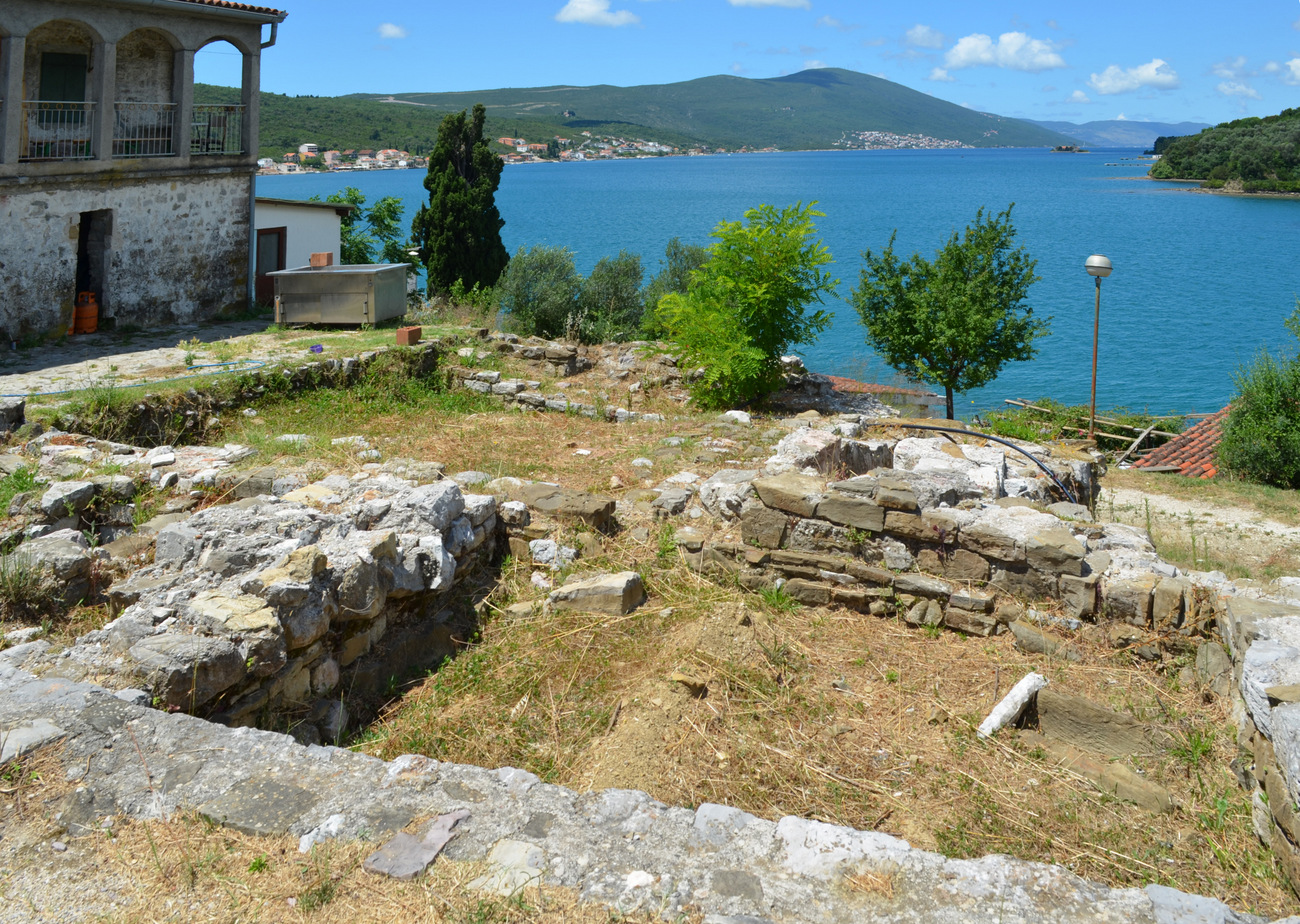
Ruins

The Monastery of Saint Archangel Michael (Serbian: Манастир Светог Архангела Михаила, romanized: Manastir Svetog Arhangela Mihaila) was founded by Serbian Archbishop Sava (s. 1219–35). The church base was built earlier, reconstructed in the 9th century and destroyed in the 11th century. The monastery was the seat of the Eparchy of Zeta between the 13th and 15th centuries. Under planned restoration, the monastery was destroyed by the Republic of Venice in 1441 after it was proclaimed unsafe due to the rumors of a plague breakout. Recent research by the Military Medical Academy in Belgrade, using recovered remains of monks from that time have revealed that the monks died probably due to arsenic poisoning. There are remains of the church base.

== See also ==
- Sveti Marko Island
- Prevlaka Peninsula, also located in the Bay of Kotor, bordering Croatia
