= Tivat Municipality =

Tivat Municipality Opština Tivat Општина Тиват
- Municipality
- Coat of arms

- Tivat Municipality in Montenegro
- Country: Montenegro
- Seat: Tivat

Area
  - Total: 46 km^{2} (18 sq mi)

Population (2011)
  - Total: 14,031
  - Density: 310/km^{2} (790/sq mi)
- Demonym: Tivćani
- Postal code: 85320
- Area code: +382 32
- ISO 3166-2 code: ME-19
- Car plates: TV
- Climate: Csa
- Website: opstinativat.me

Tivat Municipality (Montenegrin: Opština Tivat / Општина Тиват) is the smallest municipality in Montenegro by area, situated in the Bay of Kotor. The center of the municipality is the eponymous town, Tivat. Besides the town, Tivat municipality encompasses the Vrmac mountain and a portion of Luštica peninsula, as well as Tivat field and a number of smaller coastal settlements.

== Location and tourism ==
Tivat is located in the central part of the Bay of Kotor, south of mount Vrmac. The municipality lies mostly south of the town, and has an exit to open sea at the tourist location Pržno inlet near Radovići village to the south. Its central part, where Tivat Airport is located, lies in fertile Grbalj valley. The airport is located near the isthmus of Luštica peninsula, which belongs to the municipality of Herceg Novi for the most part. The former naval base is now "Porto Montenegro", a superyacht marina developed by Canadian billionaire Peter Munk, then sold in 2016 to the Investment Corporation of Dubai. Tivat is 19 kilometres (12 miles) away from Herceg Novi, 10 km (6.2 mi) away from Kotor, 23 km (14 mi) away from Budva, 80 km (50 mi) from Dubrovnik and 90 km (56 mi) from Podgorica. Geomorphologically, Tivat is composed of three areas. The first is the hills and peaks of Vrmac, Velji Vrh (710 metres (2,329 feet)) and Popova glava (584 metres (1,916 feet)). Water activity formed capes Seljanovo, Pakovo and Račica. The second area is Tivat field, flattened by water activity. The third area is Krtoli with islands (Island of Flowers, Sveti Marko Island, and Our Lady of Mercy which is bordered by Novski bay on the north-west and Grbalj area on the south-east.

=== City Assembly (2022–2026) ===
Party/Coalition	Seats	Local government
DPS	7 / 32	Opposition
GG NP	3 / 32	Government
DCG	3 / 32	Government
ZBCG (NSD–DNP)	3 / 32	Government
HGI	3 / 32	Opposition
PES	2 / 32	Government
SD	2 / 32	Opposition
DSS	2 / 32	Government
SDP	2 / 32	Opposition
KL	2 / 32	Government
LP	1 / 32	Opposition
BF	1 / 32	Government
TA	1 / 32	Government

== Population ==
Town of Tivat is the administrative centre of the Tivat municipality, which has a population of 14,031, according to 2011 census. The town of Tivat itself has a population of 10,237.

Ethnicity (2011 census):

- 4,666 Montenegrins (33.25%)
- 4,435 Serbs (31.61%)
- 2,304 Croats (16.42%)
- 2,626 others/undeclared (18,71%)

Languages (2011 census):

- 5,493 Serbian (38.93%)
- 4,319 Montenegrin (30.61%)
- 1,167 Croatian (8.27%)
- 3.132 rest and undeclared (22.19%)

Religions (2011 census):

- 9,057 Orthodoxy (64.55%)
- 2,870 Catholics (20.45%)
- 716 Muslims (5.10%)
- 1,388 rest and undeclared (9.90%)

== Gallery ==
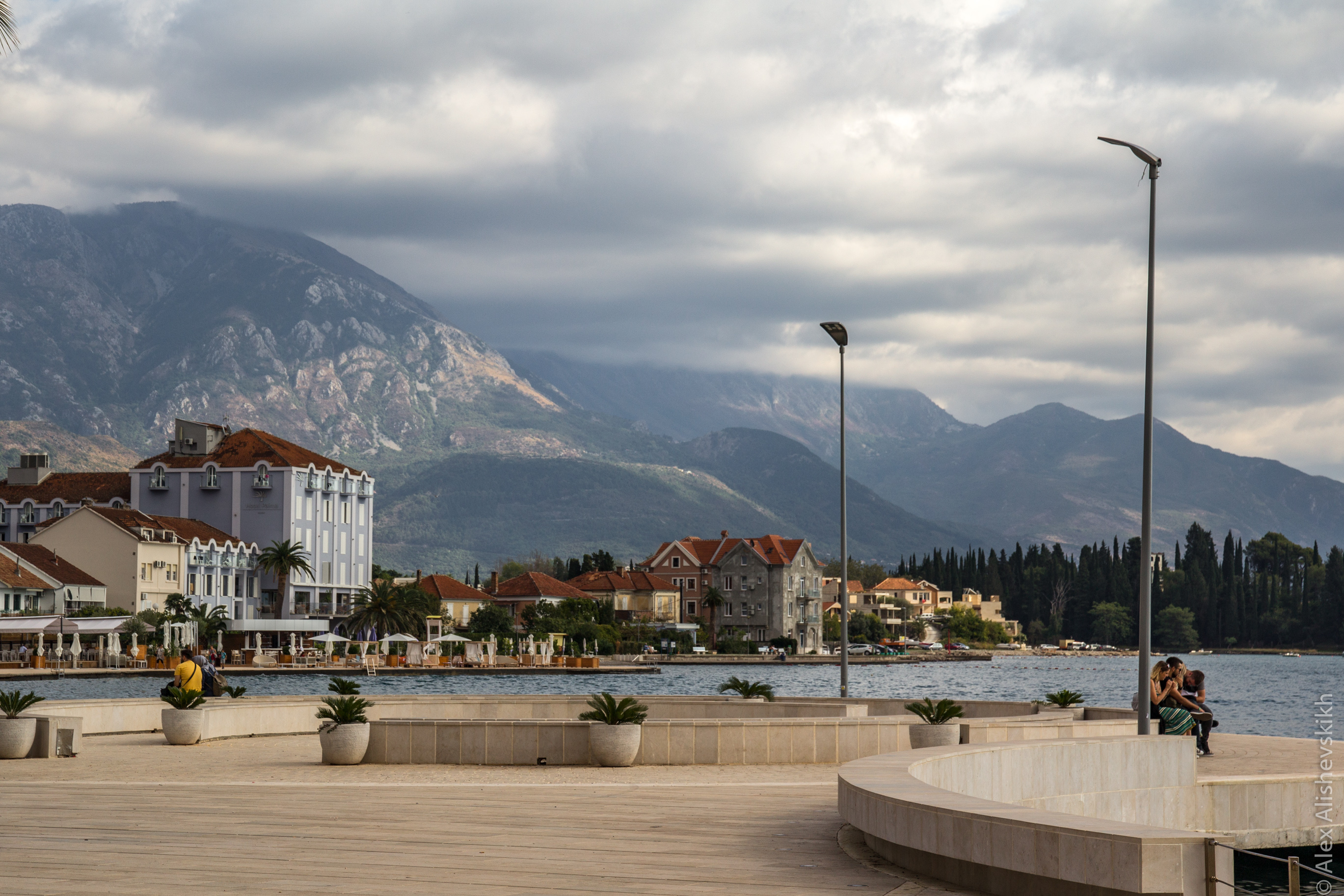
Town of Tivat

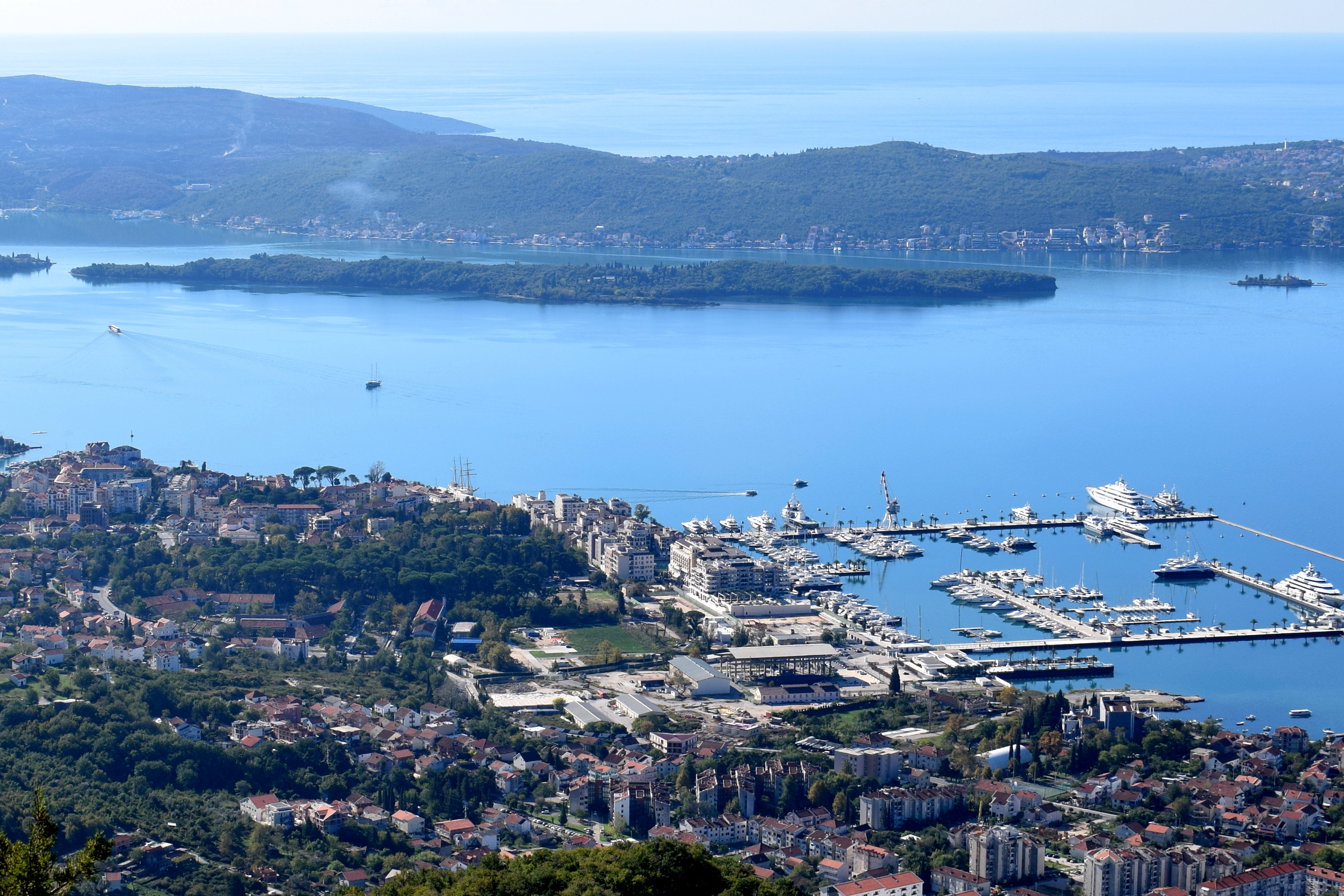
Stradioti island, Tivat

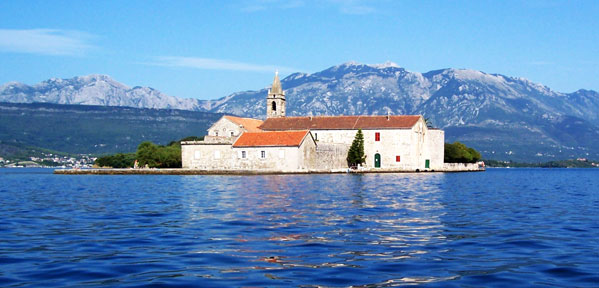
Our Lady of Mercy

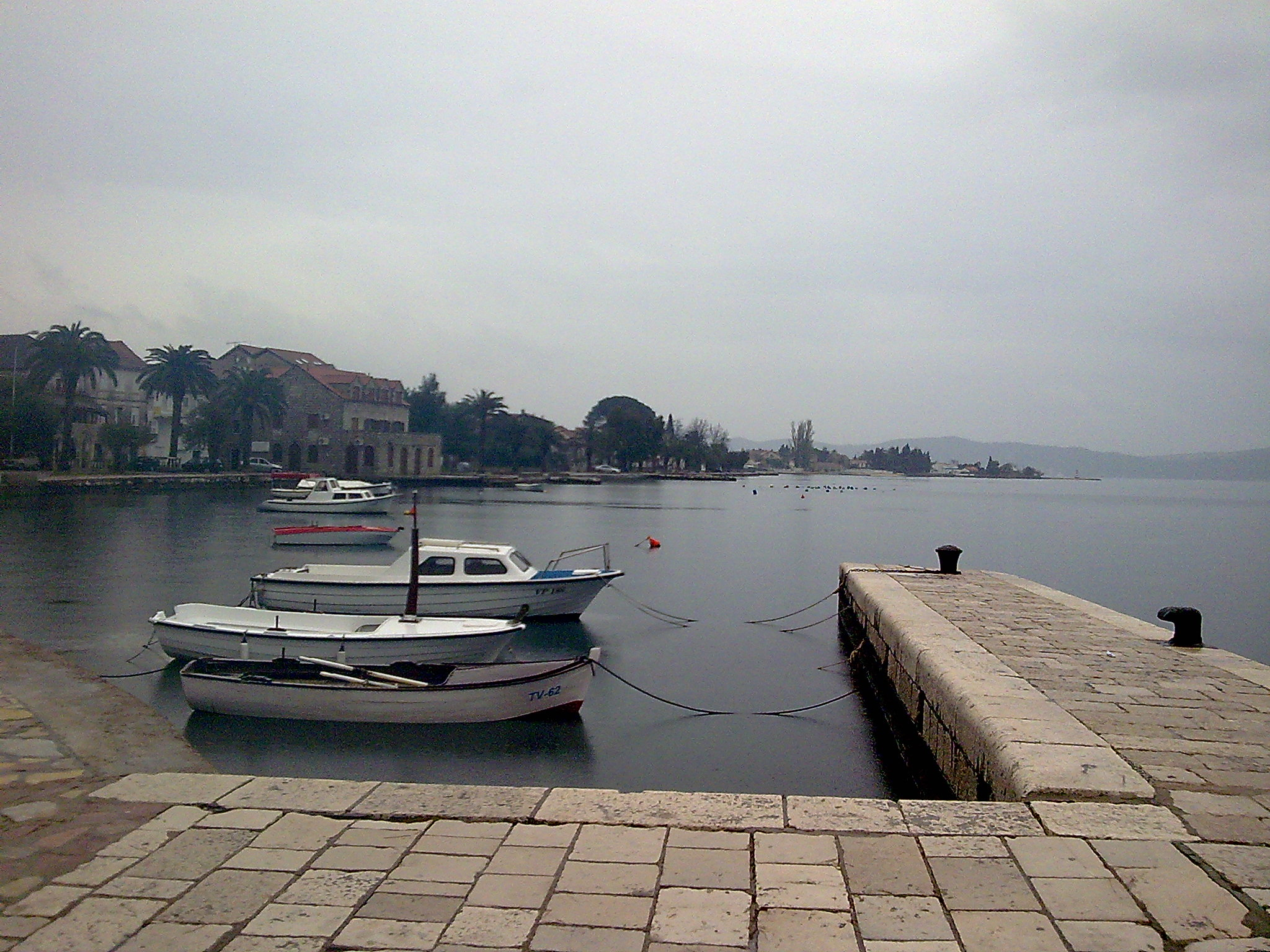
Donja Lastva

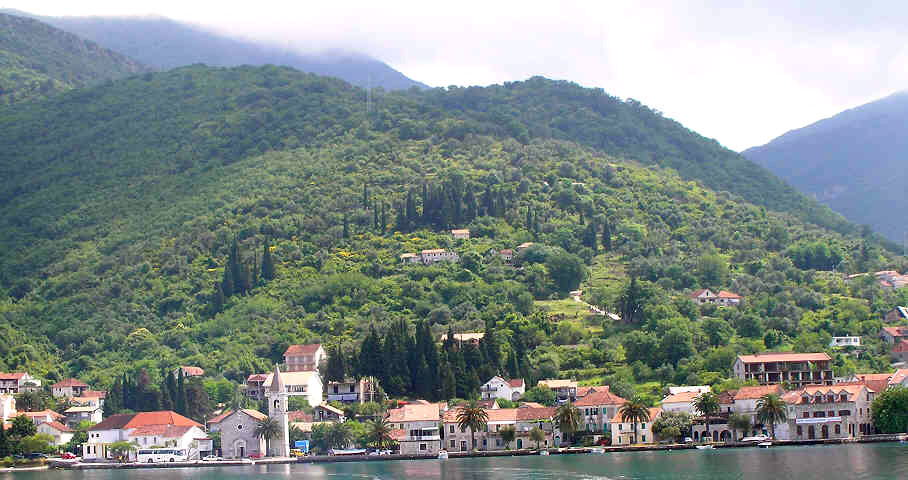
Tivat part of Lastva

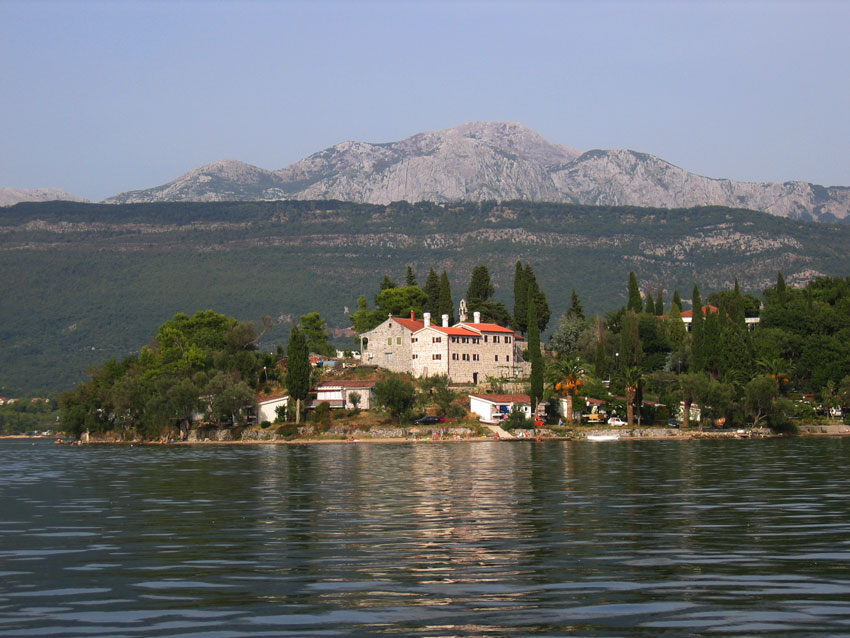
Island of Flowers

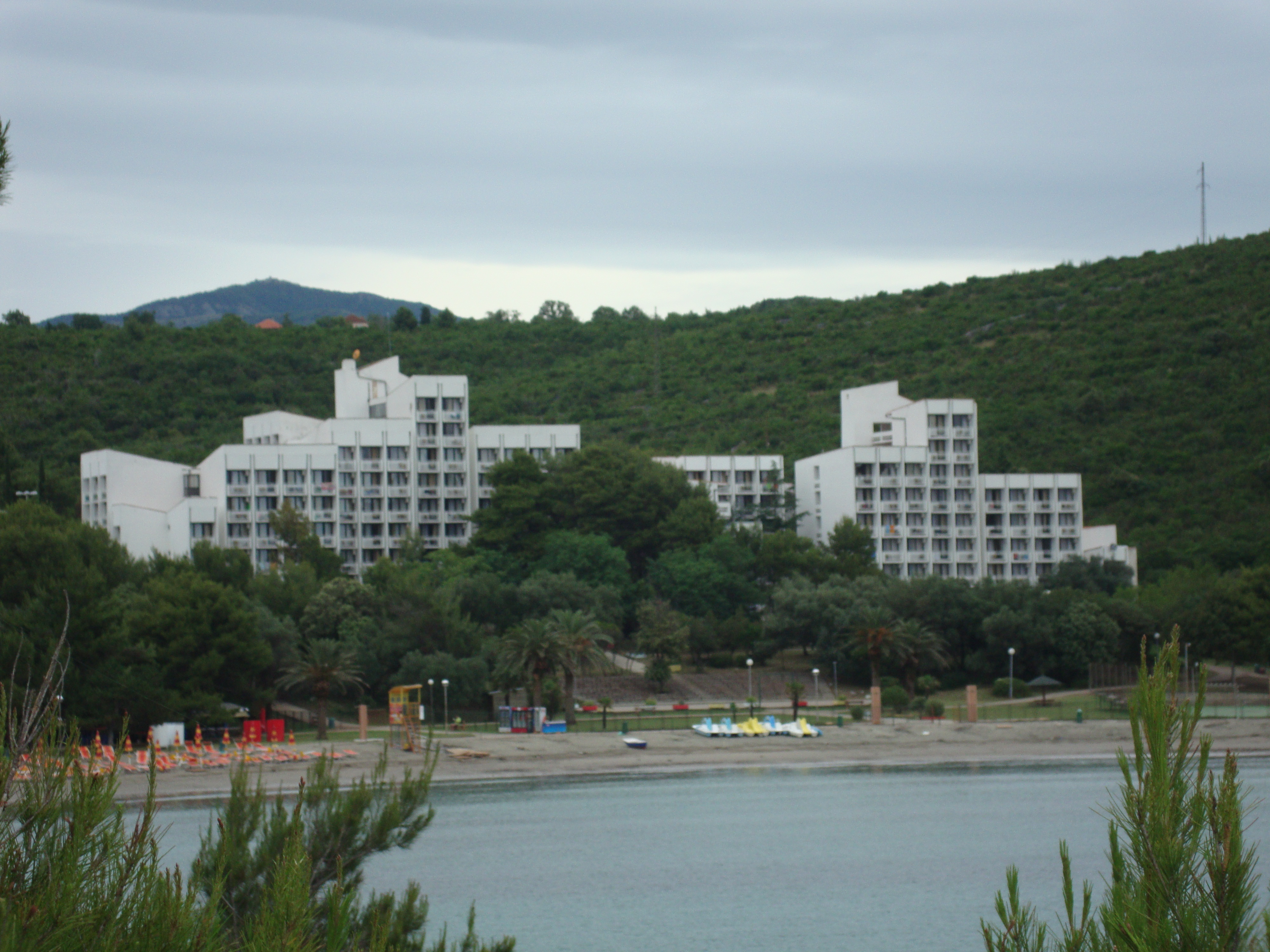
Plavi Horizonti beach

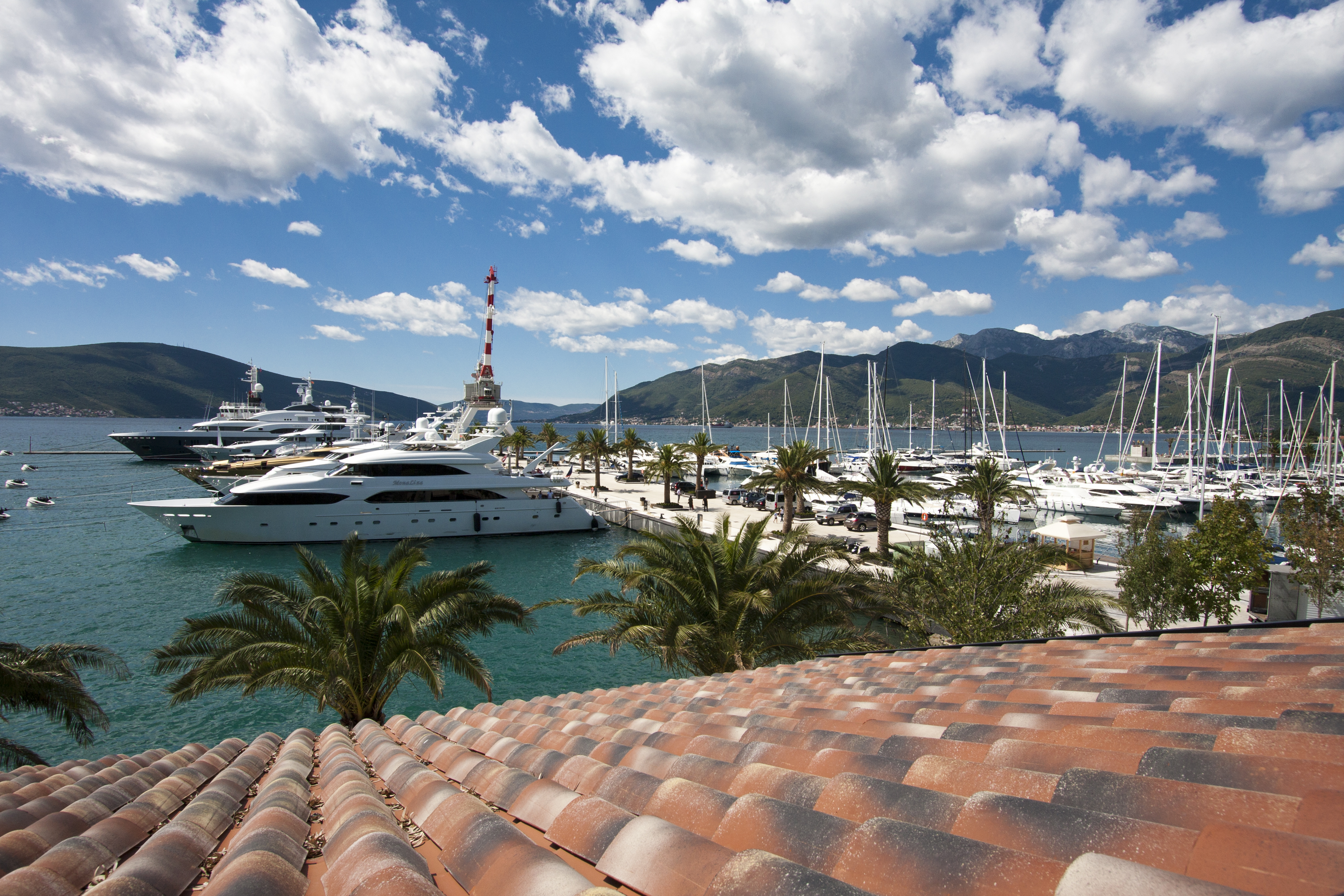
Porto Montenegro
