= Sveti Marko Island =

Island of Montenegro

Coordinates: 42.4111°N 18.6917°E

Sveti Marko
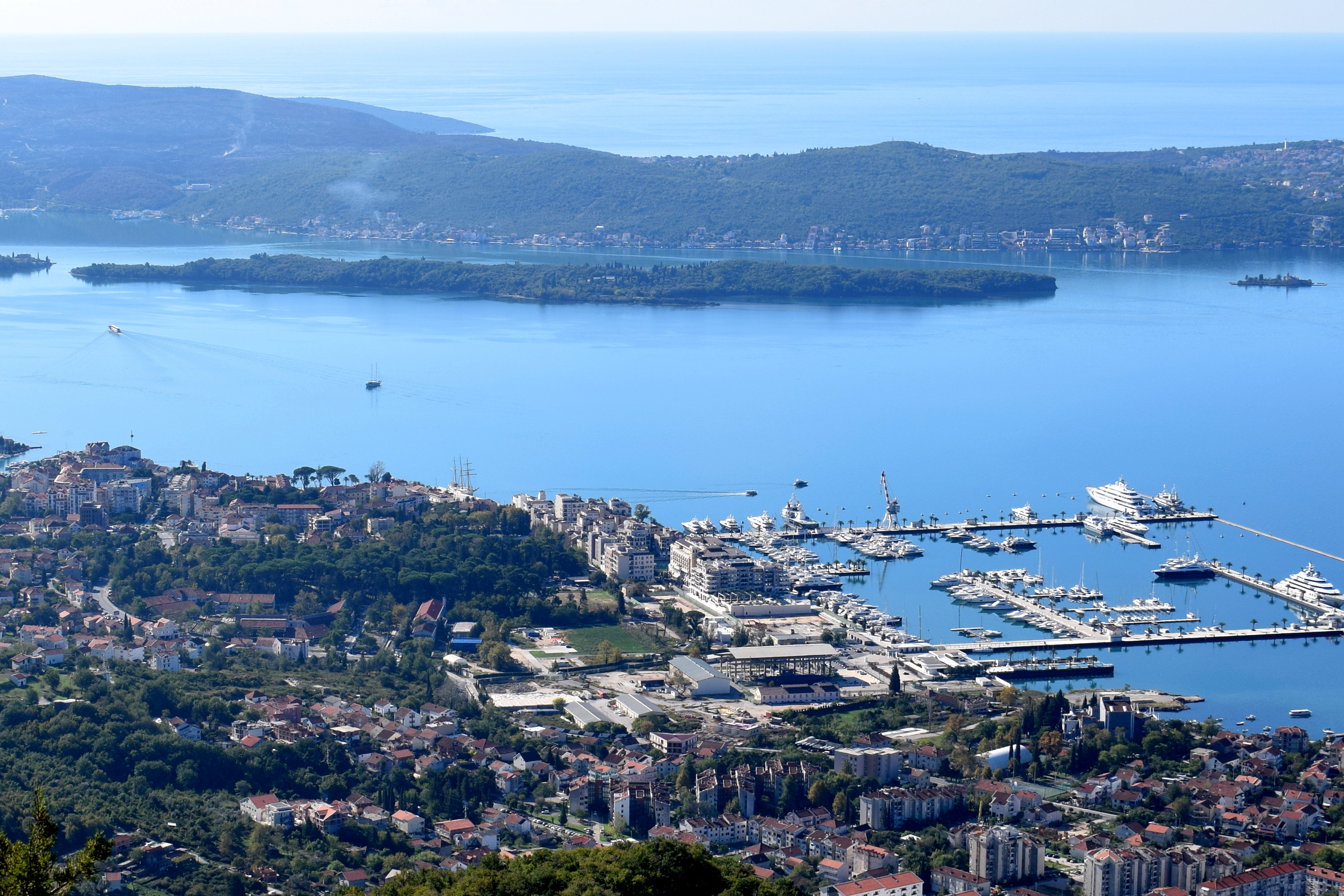
- View of St. Marko and Our Lady of Mercy Islands, Tivat

- Location within Montenegro

Geography
- Location: Bay of Kotor
- Area: 40 ha (99 acres)

Administration
- Montenegro

Demographics
- Population: 12

Sveti Marko Island (Montenegrin: Острво Свети Марко, romanized: Ostrvo Sveti Marko, lit. 'Island of Saint Mark'), historically known as Stradioti (Страдиоти), is an island on the Adriatic Sea, in the Montenegrin municipality of Tivat.

== History ==
According to an Ancient Greek legend the island was the gift of gods to Greek soldiers who healed their wounds after battles on the island. Out of gratitude, they swore that they will never again wage a war on their own, but only protect themselves if need be. They broke the oath eventually, and the enraged gods sent a deadly storm which killed everyone on the island, leaving only the beautiful old olive trees. Original name of the island in the Middle Ages, during the rule of the Serbian monarchs, was Sveti Gavrilo and according to another legend monastery dedicated to the mentioned Saint occupied the island. Together with the Sveti Mihailo Island it formed the Archipelago of the Holy Archangels. After the takeover of the Montenegrin littoral by the Venetian republic, the island became known as the Stradioti, after the Venetian cavalry composed mainly of the ethnic Albanians who had their fortress and barracks built on the island in 1499. Towards the end of the 16th century, the military units were disbanded and island was named after Sveti Marko, the protector of Venice.

== About the island ==
Sveti Marko Island is located near the town of Tivat, in the Bay of Kotor. It is aligned with the Tivat's other island, Prevlaka Island (the Island of Flowers).

The island is entirely covered with greenery. In 1962, a tourist settlement was built there, with 500 Tahiti-style houses, without water supply or electricity. It was managed by Club Med, and until the Yugoslav wars, it was a very popular tourist destination. Today, it is mostly abandoned, making the island a somewhat exotic and mysterious destination.

OSTRVO SVETI MARKO D.O.O. is a legal owner of Sveti Marko Island (ex-Stradioti). The beautiful island with its virgin nature, and great location has unique perspectives and opportunities for development.

== See also ==
- Tivat Municipality
- Bay of Kotor
