= Tivat =

Town and municipality in Montenegro

Tivat Тиват
- Town and municipality
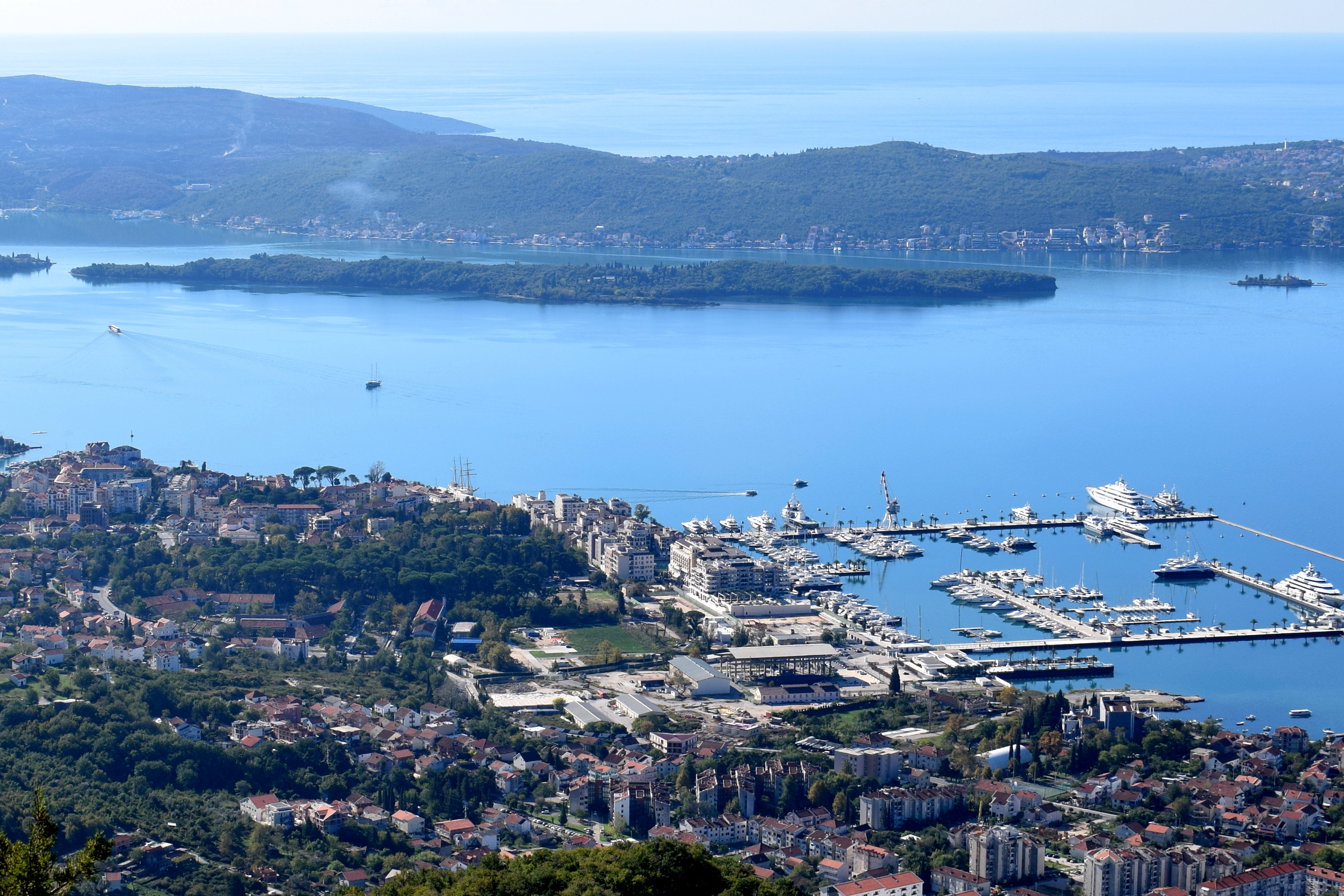
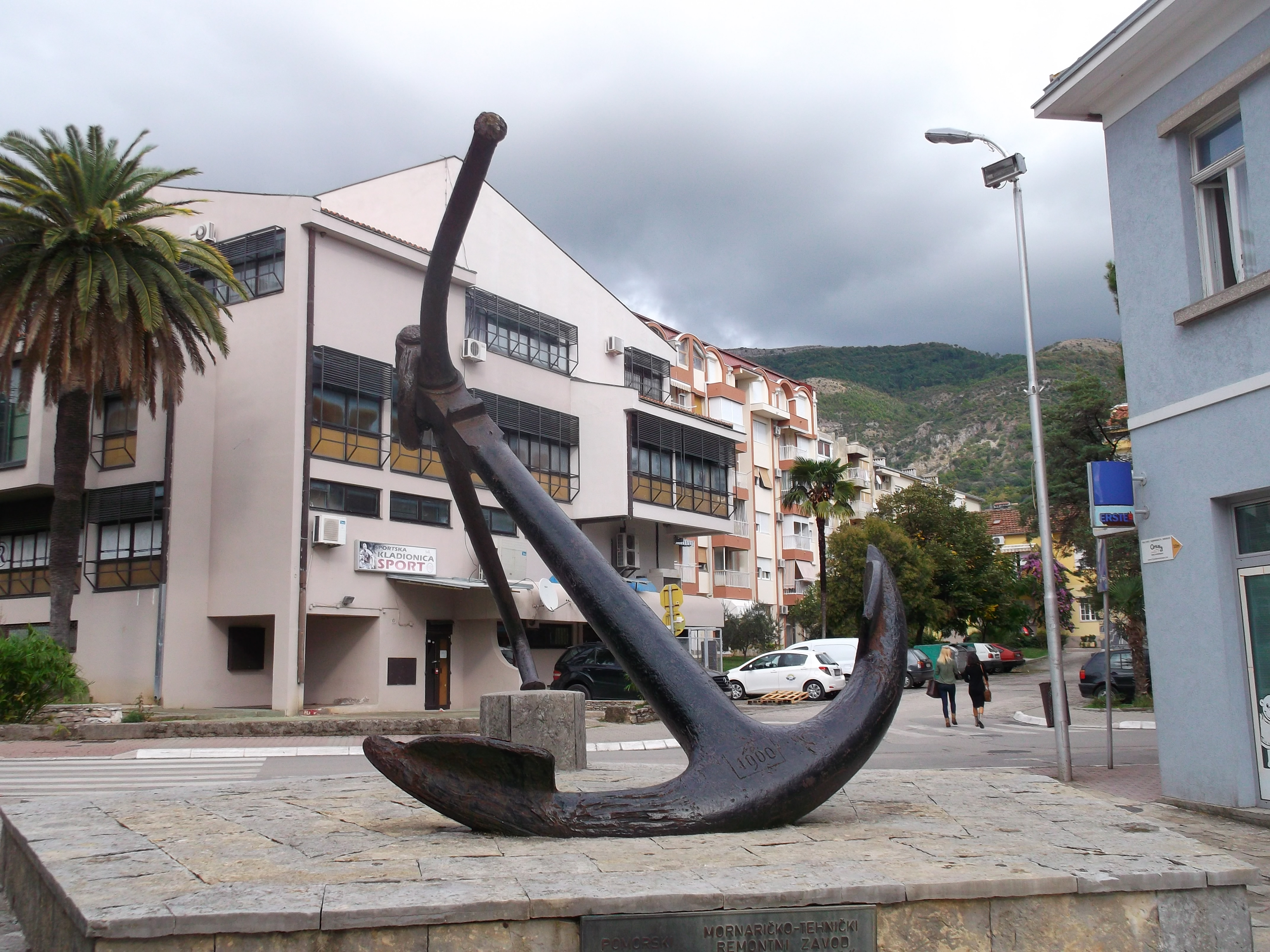
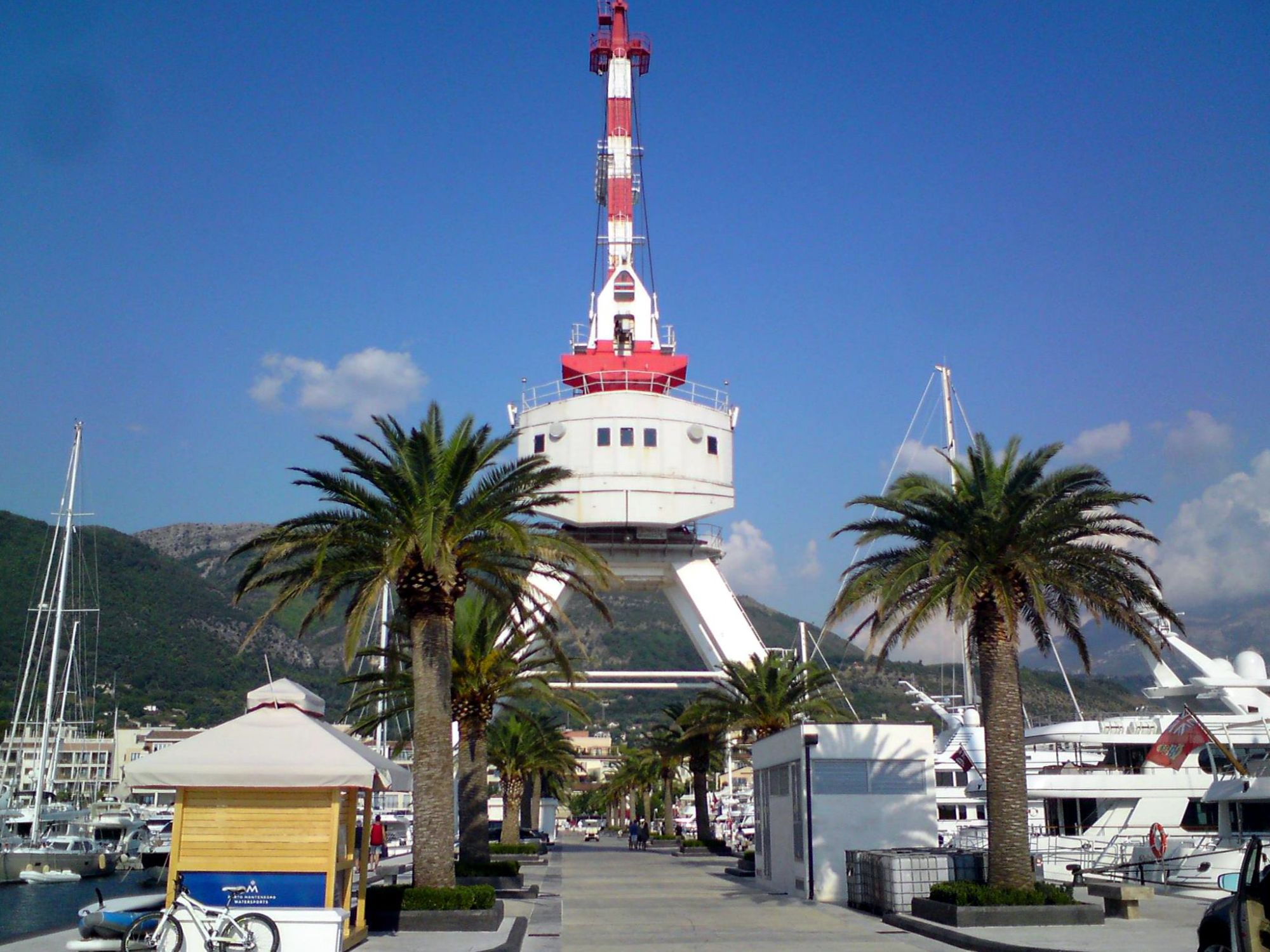
- From the top: View over the city, Anchor monument, The Marina

- Flag Coat of arms

- Location of Tivat
- Coordinates: 42.43°N 18.70°E
- Country: Montenegro
- Region: Coastal
- Municipality: Tivat
- Founded: 14th century
- Settlements: 12

Government
  - Type: Mayor-Assembly
  - Mayor: Željko Komnenović (Independent)

Area
  - Town and municipality: 46 km^{2} (18 sq mi)

Population (2011 census)
  - Rank: 12th in Montenegro
  - Density: 296/km^{2} (770/sq mi)
  - Urban: 9,367
  - Rural: 3,794
  - Municipality: 14,031
- Demonym(s): Tivćanin (male), Tivćanka (female)
- Time zone: UTC+1 (CET)
  - Summer (DST): UTC+2 (CEST)
- Postal code: 85320
- Area code: +382 32
- ISO 3166-2 code: ME-19
- Car plates: TV
- Climate: Csa
- Website: Official website

Tivat (Montenegrin: Tivat / Тиват, pronounced [tîv̞at]) is a town in the coastal region of Montenegro, located in the Bay of Kotor. As of 2011, its population was 9,367. Tivat is the centre of Tivat Municipality, which is the smallest municipality by area in Montenegro.

== Name ==
In Serbo-Croatian, the city is known as Tivat (Тиват); in Italian and Venetian as Teodo. The town was first mentioned in the 14th century records of Kotor, as Teude, Theode, and Theudo, and has been connected to the Illyrian Queen Teuta, who ruled the region in 3rd century BC. Teuta had a residence in Rhizon and a summer residence between the church of St. Rocco in Donja Lastva and Seljanovo. The name could also come from the Greek word "Θείοδος" (Theiodos, meaning "way of God"), or from the names of old Christian saints: Theodulus, Theodocius or Theodotus. Besides the popular name Theudo, a Latin expression, Latus Tiuveti, comes from the 16th century. Finally, the name could originate from the Celtic word touto, town.

== History ==
Archaeological sites attest that the area was inhabited in antiquity, with Greek and Roman settlements. Tombs and tombstones from the Roman period were discovered in Lastva and Opatovo.

Tivat is the youngest town in the Bay of Kotor area and was established on the plateau at the bottom of the Vrmac. During the Middle Ages, the fertile lands of the area belonged mostly to the aristocrats of Kotor, Prčanj and Dobrota. Estates, castles and chalets were there as well as the collective church of St Anton dating from 1373. Part of this inheritance, which was the property of the wealthy Buća family, is a historic chalet which today houses Tivat's museums and galleries. The residence of the metropolitan of the bishopric of Zeta was built from the 13th to the 15th century on the Prevlaka Island. Tivat, known as Teodo in Venetian, was under the Republic of Venice as a part of Albania Veneta from 1420 to 1797. In those centuries Teodo enjoyed economic development that attracted many Serb refugees from Ottoman-held areas. Some Venetian-style buildings are still standing today.

Rapid development of Tivat started in the second half of 19th century when the Austrian Empire built a maritime arsenal for its fleet. Still the town shaped itself by developing small industry. In the beginning of 1918, in the Tivat Bay sailors revolted against the Austrian empire. With great approval and support, people from this area followed their revolutionary actions. The period between two world wars was marked with syndicate activity in Račica, Krtoli and Arsenal. Between 1941 and 1943 the town was part of the Italian Governatorate of Dalmatia.

In 1889, a naval arsenal was built by Austrians, and was later used as a naval military base of the Italian Navy, the Yugoslav People's Army and the Army of Montenegro. The JNA enjoyed an international reputation as a powerful, well-equipped, and well-trained force. The base was also used by Russia and Libya as the technical base for maintenance, repair and overhaul (MRO) of their ships and submarines.

== Geography ==
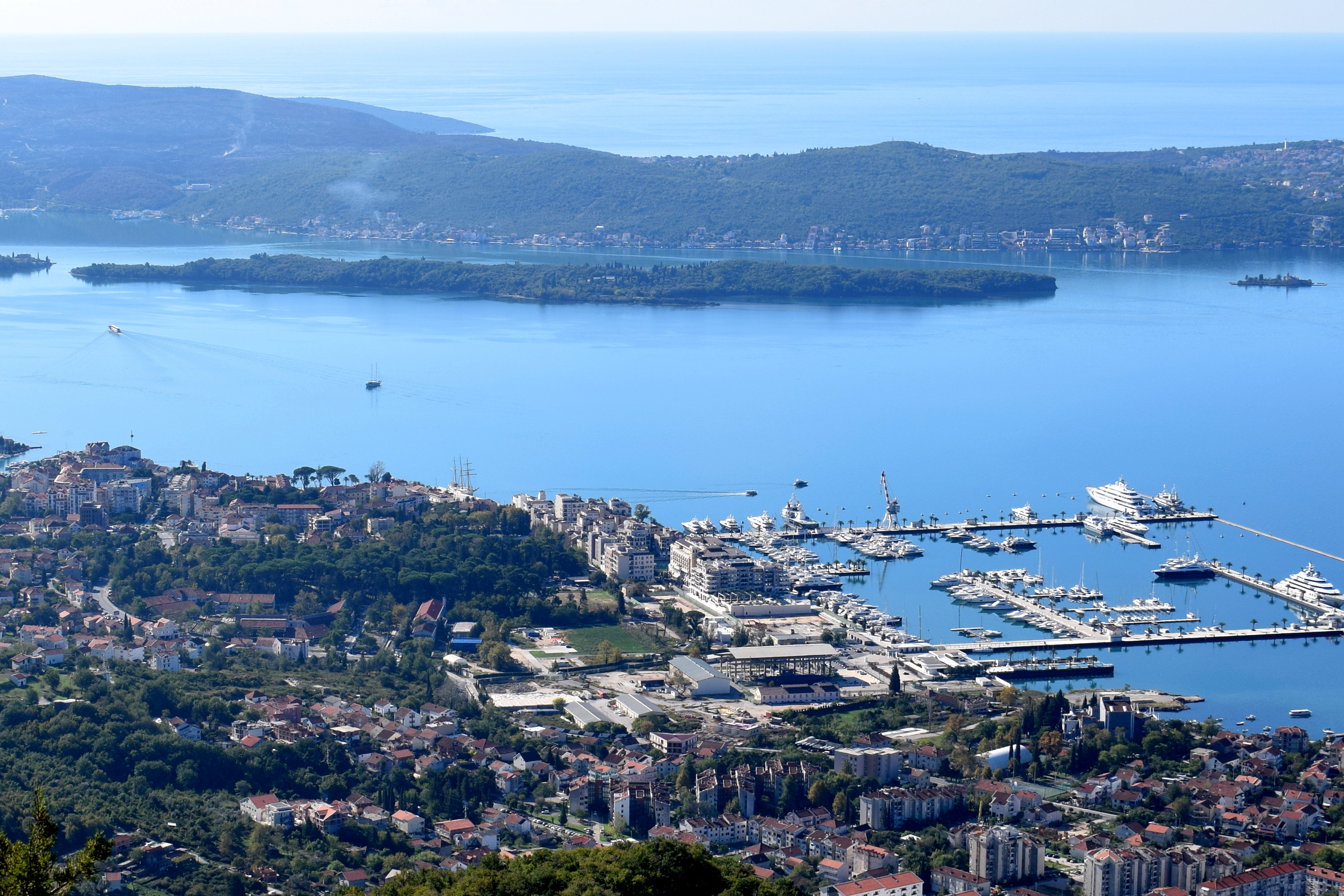
St. Marko and Our Lady of Grace Islands, near town of Tivat

Tivat is located in the central part of the Bay of Kotor (Boka Kotorska, or simply "Boka"), south of mount Vrmac. The municipality lies mostly south of the town, and has an exit to open sea at the tourist location Pržno inlet near Radovići village to the south. Its central part, where Tivat Airport is located, lies in fertile Grbalj valley. The airport is located near the isthmus of Luštica peninsula, which belongs to the municipality of Herceg Novi for the most part.

Tivat has about 14,000 inhabitants. It is 19 kilometres (12 miles) away from Herceg Novi, 10 km (6.2 mi) away from Kotor, 23 km (14 mi) away from Budva, 80 km (50 mi) from Dubrovnik and 90 km (56 mi) from Podgorica. Geomorphologically, Tivat is composed of three areas. The first is the hills and peaks of Vrmac, Velji Vrh (710 metres (2,329 feet)) and Popova glava (584 metres (1,916 feet)). Water activity formed capes Seljanovo, Pakovo and Račica. The second area is Tivat field, flattened by water activity. The third area is Krtoli with islands – Island of Flowers, St. Marko, and Lady of Mercy which is bordered by Novski bay on the north-west and Grbalj area on the south-east.

== Demographics ==
Tivat is the 12th largest city in terms of population, which was 10,743 in 2023.

Historical population
Year	Pop.	±%
1981	9,315	—
1991	11,404	+22.4%
2003	13,422	+17.7%
2011	14,031	+4.5%
Population size may be affected by changes in administrative divisions.

The majority of the city’s population consists of Montenegrins, who make up 34.31%, followed by Serbs at 32.23% (2023 census). The same census records that Croats account for 12.89% of residents. Since the war in Ukraine began in 2022, a significant number of Russians (5.41%) and Ukrainians (1.07%) have moved to Tivat.

Montenegrin, Serbian, Bosnian, and Croatian are mutually intelligible as standard varieties of the Serbo-Croatian language. Serbian is the most spoken language in the town, with 37.84% of the population using it, followed closely by Montenegrin at 34.73%. Russian ranks third at 6.21%, while Croatian is spoken by 4.99%. Other languages (Albanian, Bosnian, Ukrainian, and undeclared) speak 16.23% of population.

=== Religion ===
Religion in Tivat (2011)
1. Eastern Orthodoxy (64.0%)
2. Catholicism (21.4%)
3. Islam (4.62%)
4. Irreligion (8.11%)
5. Other religions (1.81%)

Religion in Tivat is diverse. The predominant religion is Eastern Orthodoxy (64.05%), primarily practiced by the majority of Montenegrins and Serbs. However, Tivat is also home to other religious communities, including Catholics (21.45%), Muslims (4.62%), and other smaller religious communities. There are also 8.11% of non-religious people. The town has Orthodox churches, Catholic churches, mosques and other places of worship catering to the religious needs of its inhabitants.

== Sports ==
The local football team is FK Arsenal Tivat, who have spent several seasons in the country's second tier. They share their Stadion u Parku with rugby team RFC Arsenal Tivat. The town's basketball team is KK Teodo Tivat.

== Tourism ==
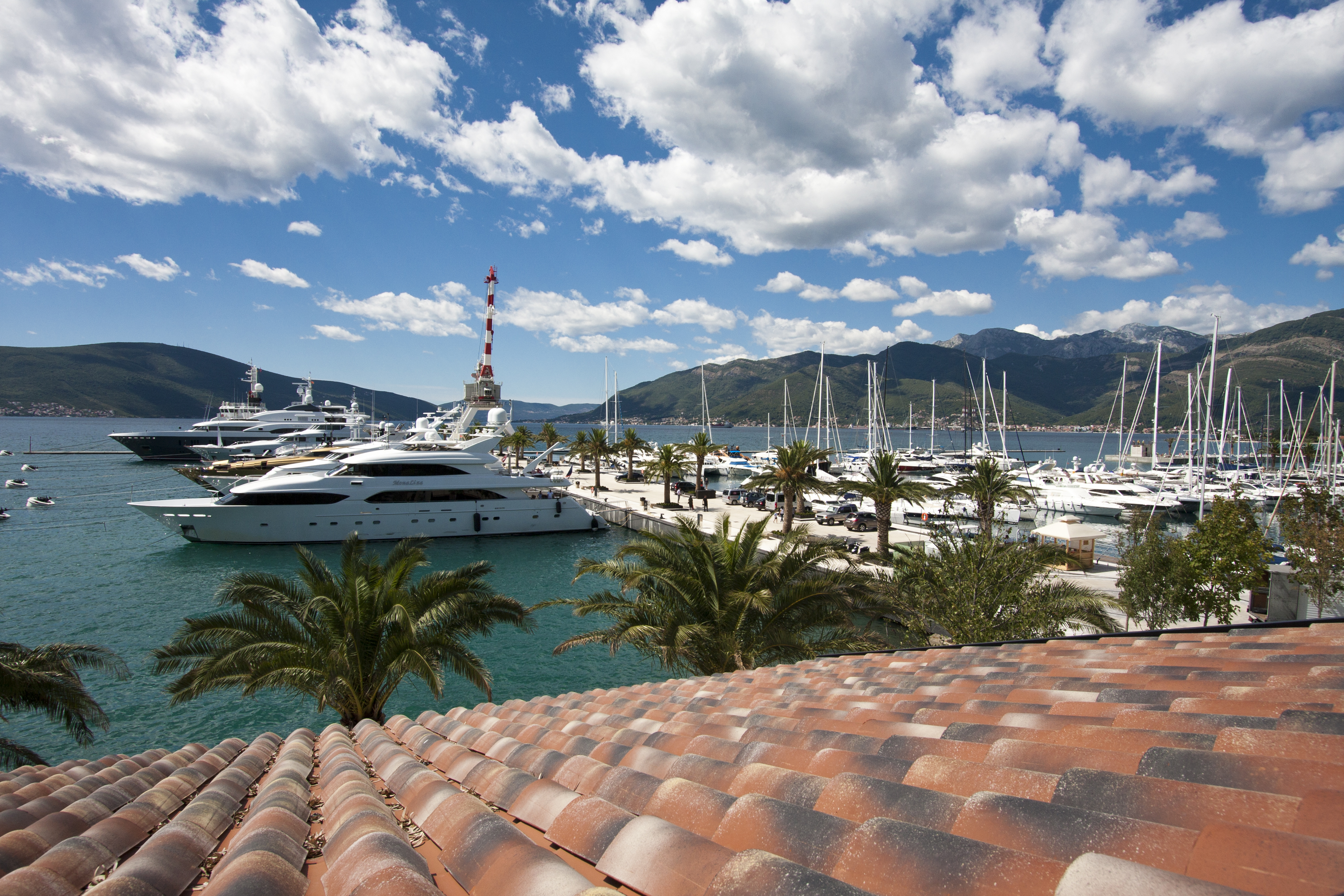
Porto Montenegro, luxury yacht marina

Already a tourist resort, Tivat is set to become a nautical tourism centre for the southern Adriatic.

The inlets near Prevlaka, as well as the localities of Župa and Kalimanj, provide great conditions for the construction of marinas and yachting clubs. Canadian businessman Peter Munk bought a naval shipyard in Tivat, intending to transform it into a luxury vacation resort and a marina for luxury yachts called Porto Montenegro.

In 1971 Tivat Airport acquired a modern runway and is now a significant airport for foreign air traffic. It served 1,367,282 passengers in 2019.

Although it is the youngest town in the Boka region, Tivat has a number of tourist sites. Renaissance Summer House Buca in the centre of city, Ostrvo Cvijeća (Flowers’ Island) with sacred monuments, Gornja Lastva, the old nucleus at an altitude of 300 m (984.25 ft), the magnificent sandy beach at Plavi Horizonti and the Sveti Marko Island with ex-Club Med cottages are the most visited. In the city itself there is the natural port Kalimanj. There is also a choice of cultural events, such as "Bocce Olympiad" and "Summer Fest". Tivat boasts a botanic garden planted with gifts from Bokan sailors who brought back a wide variety of exotic tree species and ornamental plants from their voyages.

== Transport ==
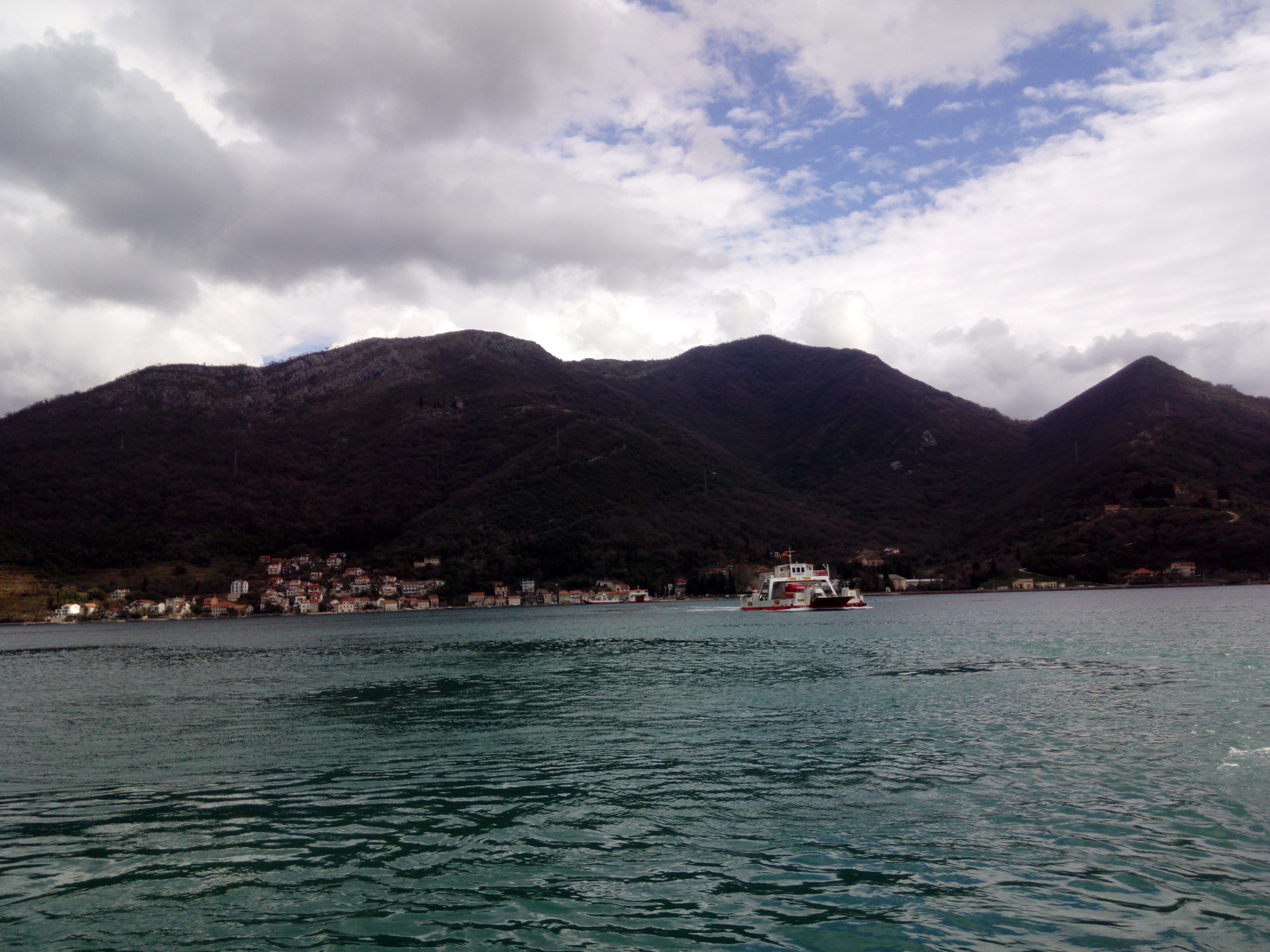
Lepetane-Kamenari Ferry

Tivat is connected with the rest of Montenegro by the Adriatic Highway, a two-laned road that runs down the length of Montenegrin coast. Travelling inland is possible by leaving the Adriatic Highway at Budva or Sutomore (through the Sozina tunnel).

A ferry operates on the Kamenari - Lepetani line across the Verige Strait, eliminating the need to go all the way around Boka Kotorska bay in order to reach the Herceg Novi riviera. It is speculated that a future Verige bridge will be constructed across the bay.

Tivat Airport is 3 km (1.9 mi) away from the city centre, and is one of the two international airports in Montenegro, the other one being Podgorica airport. Traffic at the airport follows the seasonal nature of the tourism industry in coastal Montenegro, with 80% of the total volume of passengers being handled during the peak season (May–September). Due to its proximity to the town, the airport does not operate during the night.

== International relations ==
=== Twin towns — Sister cities ===
Tivat is twinned with:

- Aleksin, Russia
- Jiading, China
- Karpoš, North Macedonia
- Konjic, Bosnia and Herzegovina
- Mola di Bari, Italy
- Novi Sad, Serbia (2023)
- Piran, Slovenia
- San Giacomo degli Schiavoni, Italy
- Sremski Karlovci, Serbia
- Trogir, Croatia
- Ub, Serbia

== Gallery ==
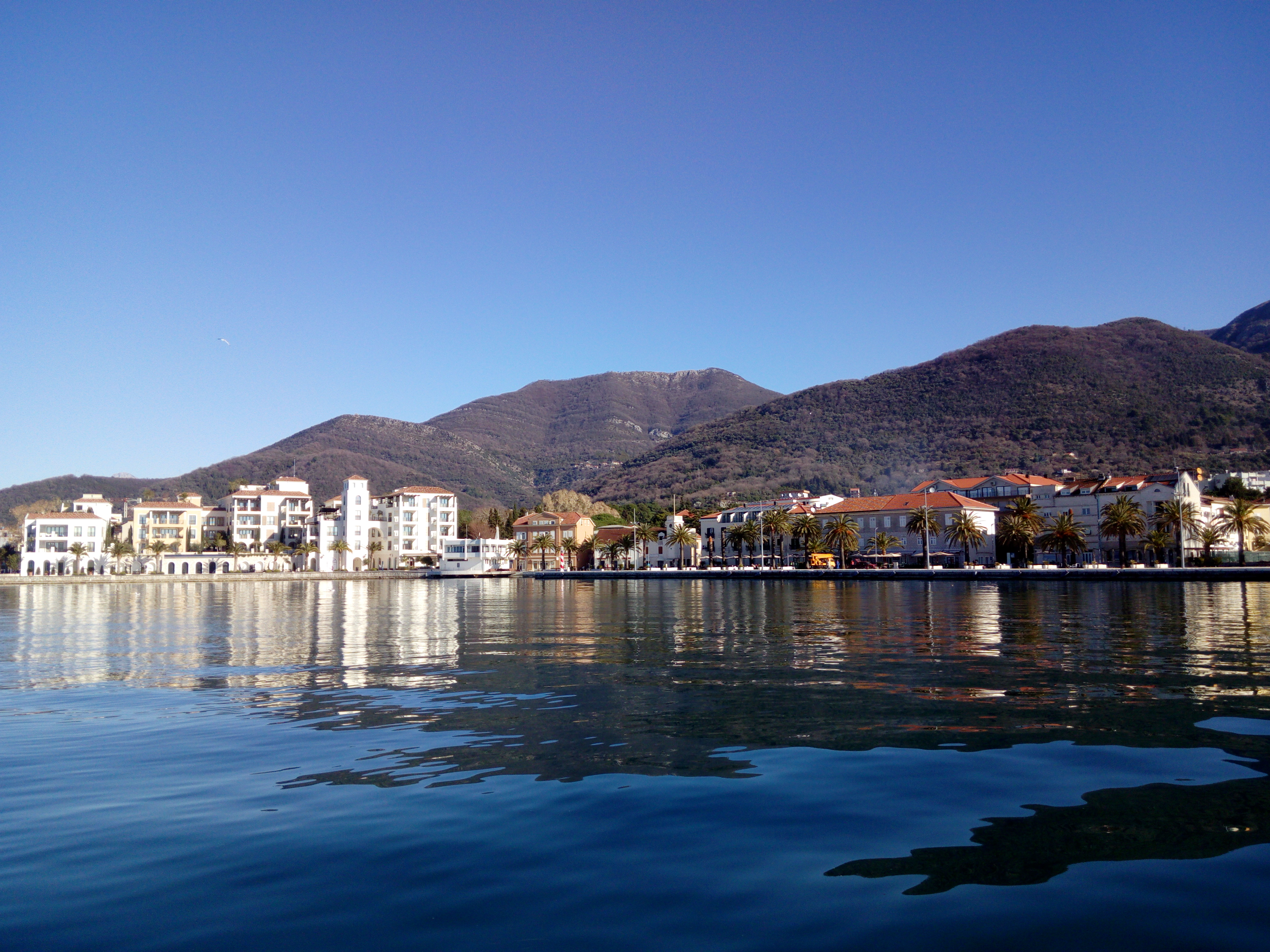
Tivat and mount Vrmac

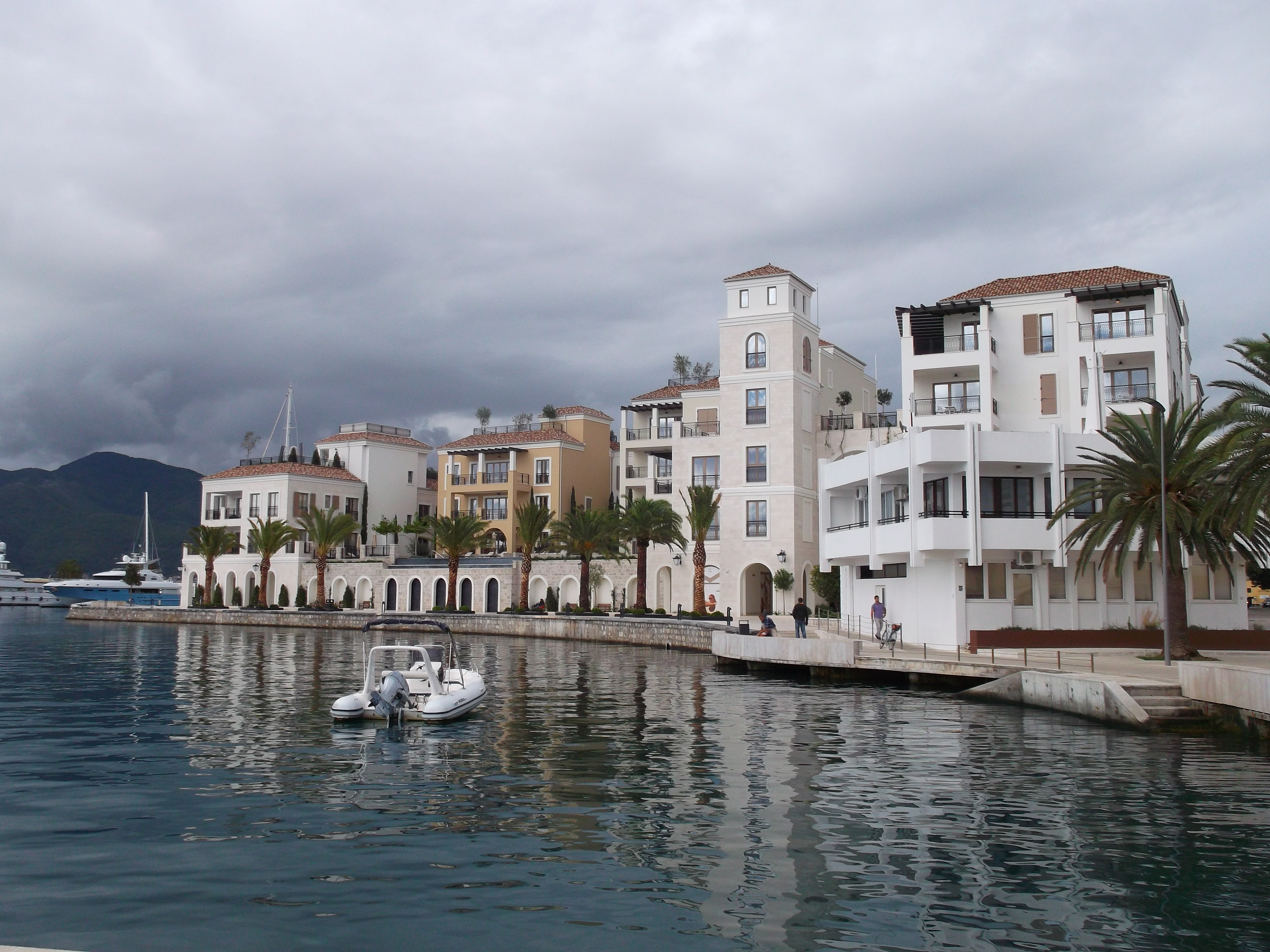
View of Town by the sea

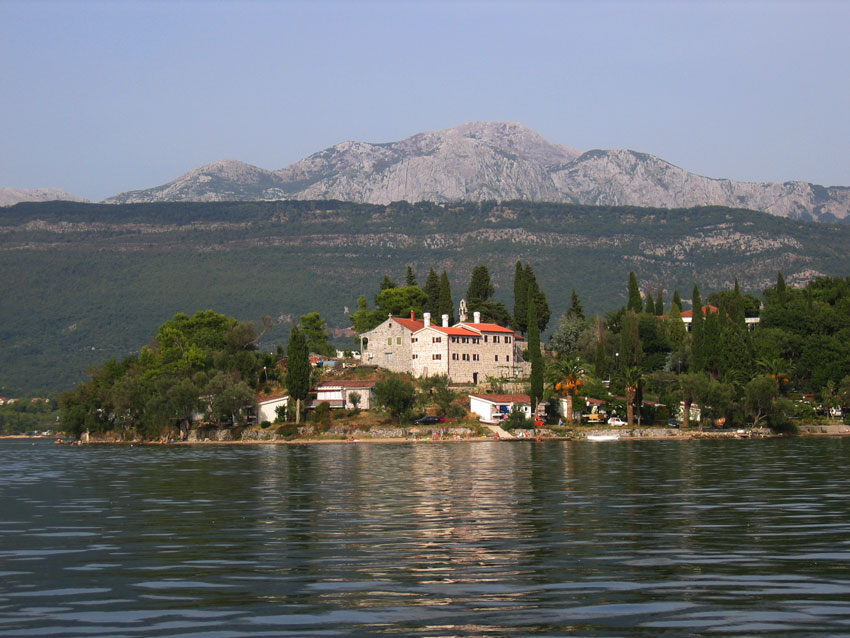
Miholjska Prevlaka

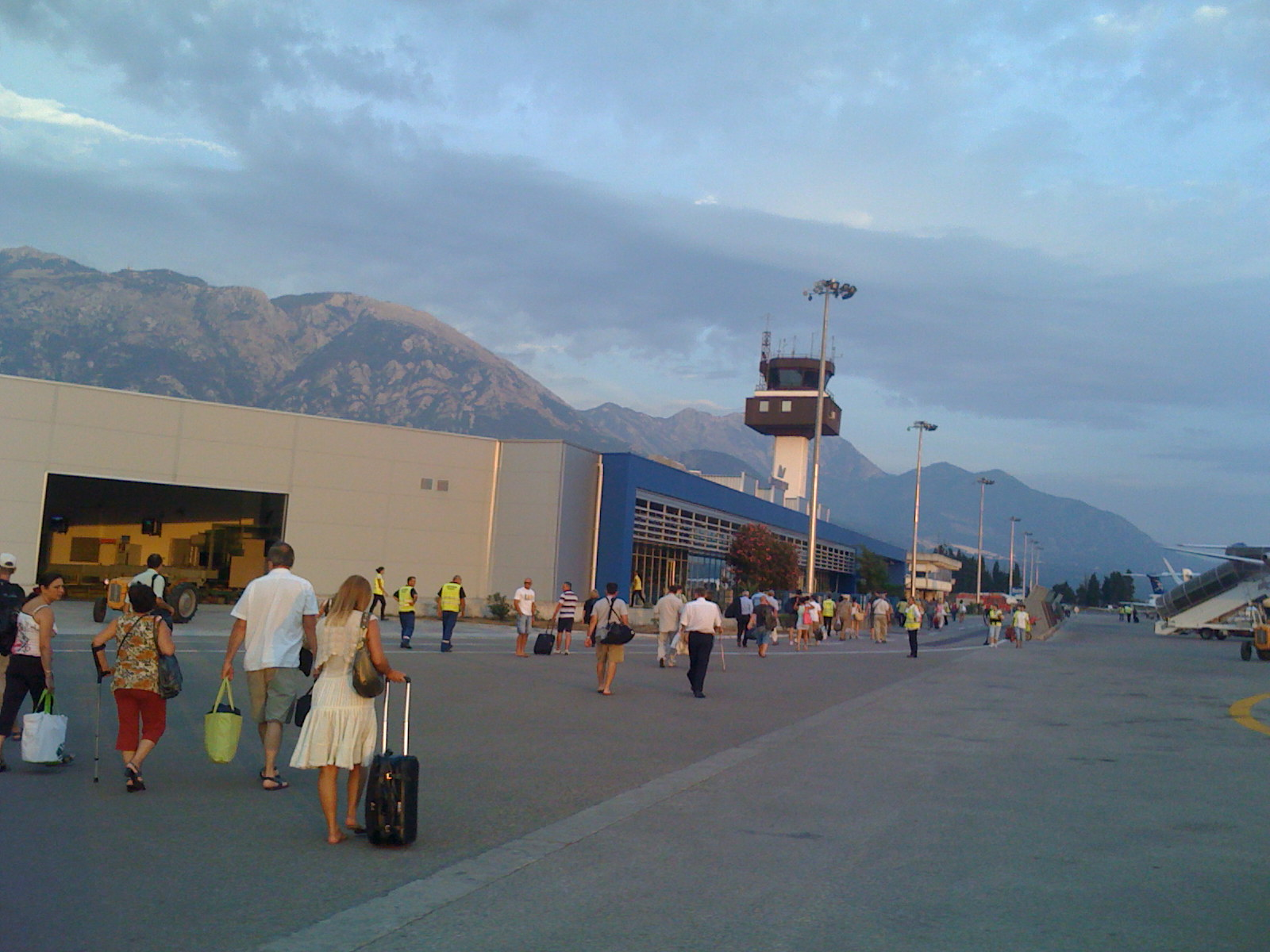
Tivat Airport

== Bibliography ==
- Calabrese M., Mola di Bari: colori suoni memorie di Puglia, Laterza, Bari, 1987.
