= Sutorina =

Village and river in Herceg Novi, Montenegro

Sutorina Суторина
- Village
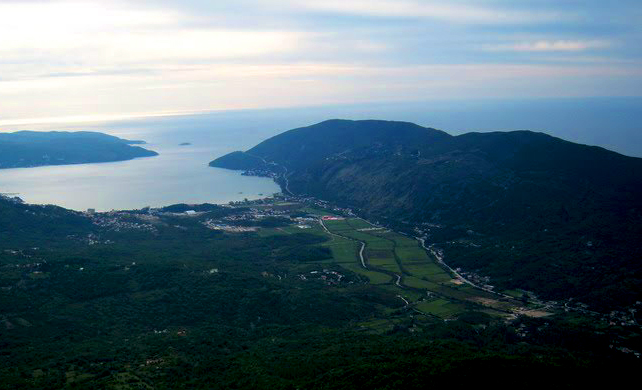
- View over Sutorina

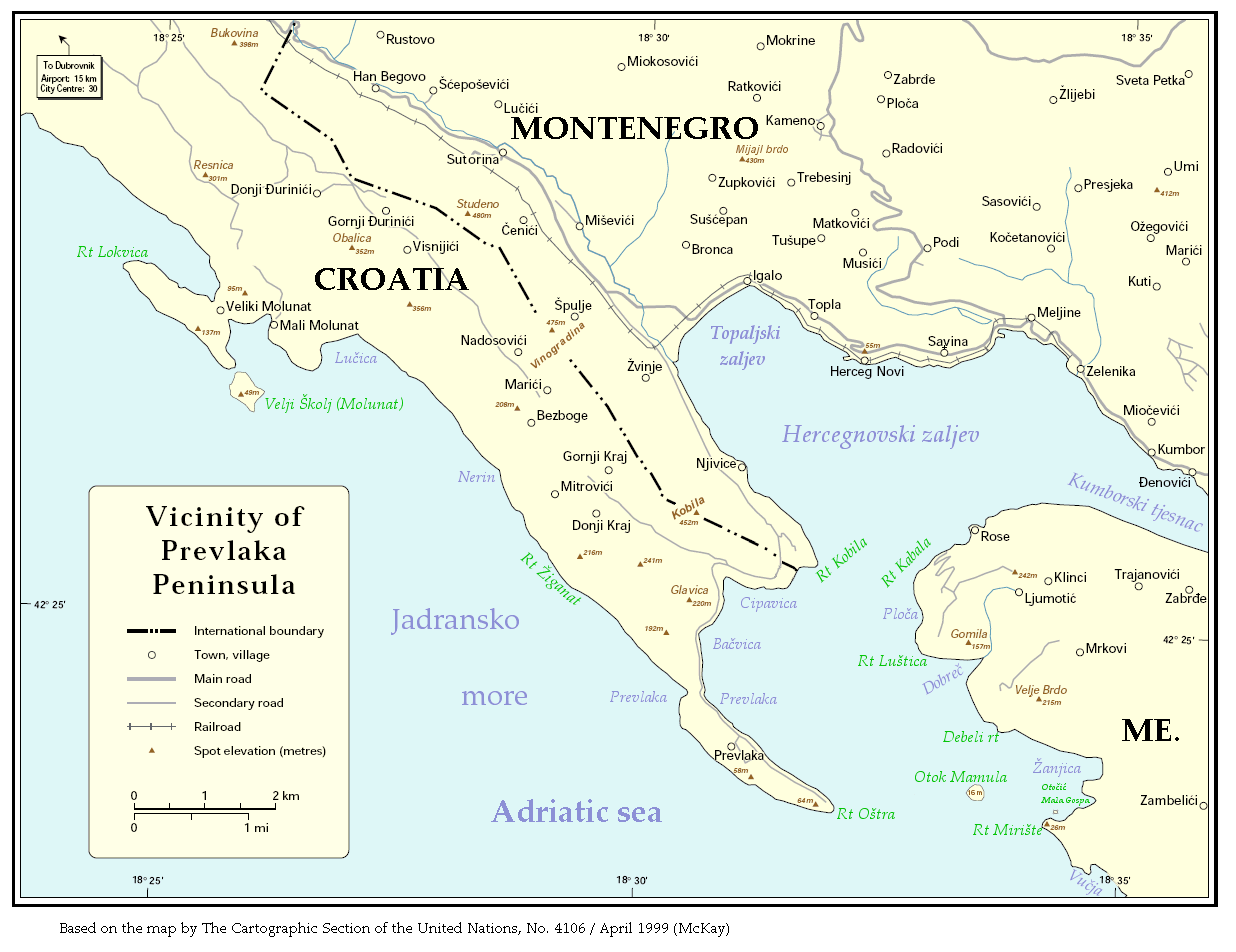
- Location of Sutorina

- Location within Montenegro
- Country: Montenegro
- Region: Coastal
- Municipality: Herceg Novi

Population (2011)
  - Total: 670
- Time zone: UTC+1 (CET)
  - Summer (DST): UTC+2 (CEST)
- Postal code: 85340
- Area code: +382 31
- Car plates: HN
- Website: http://sutorina.me

Sutorina (Montenegrin: Суторина, pronounced [sûtɔrina], Italian: Sant'Irene) is a village and a river located in Herceg Novi Municipality in southwestern Montenegro.

The village is located near the border with Croatia, some three kilometers northwest of the Adriatic Sea in Igalo.

The surrounding region, including a short stretch of the Adriatic coast, was named after the little vale of the river Sutorina west of Herceg Novi.

The 5 nmi (9.3 km; 5.8 mi) long coast on the west side of the entrance to the Boka Kotorska, from Cape Kobila to Igalo, known generally as Sutorina, includes the Sutorina valley including 6 villages: Igalo, Sutorina, Sušćepan, Prijevor, Ratiševina and Kruševice, an area of 75 km².

== History ==
Sutorina was part of Bosnia and Herzegovina within Austria-Hungary and Yugoslavia between 1878 and 1947 when it became part of SR Montenegro. Circumstances of this transfer are under long dispute, see Sutorina dispute. On 26 August 2015, governments of Bosnia and Herzegovina and Montenegro signed in Vienna a border agreement which gave sovereignty over Sutorina to Montenegro.

== Demographics ==
According to the 2011 census, its population was 670.

Ethnicity in 2011
Ethnicity	Number	Percentage
Serbs	378	56.4%
Montenegrins	160	23.9%
Roma	14	2.1%
Egyptians	7	0.4%
Croats	6	0.9%
other/undeclared	105	15.7%
Total	670	100%

== Sports ==
The local football club is FK Obilić Herceg Novi, who play in the country's third tier. FK Boka Metal Sutorina, who used to play in the same league, currently only play in youth football.

== See also ==
- Railway Čapljina - Zelenika (in Italian)
- Dračevica (župa)
