= Sutorina dispute =

Territorial dispute between Montenegro and Bosnia and Herzegovina

The Sutorina dispute was a border dispute between Montenegro and Bosnia and Herzegovina regarding the sovereignty over the territory of Sutorina. Since the Berlin Congress of 1878 the territory of Sutorina had been a part of Bosnia and Herzegovina within Austria-Hungary and later the Kingdom of Yugoslavia, but in the aftermath of World War II in 1947 it became part of SR Montenegro within FPR/SFR Yugoslavia. After the breakup of Yugoslavia, control of the territory was retained by Montenegro, but some Bosnian officials claimed that the territory transfer had been illegal, disputing Montenegrin sovereignty over the area. In 2015, the two countries reached an agreement which gave the sovereignty over the territory to Montenegro.

== History ==
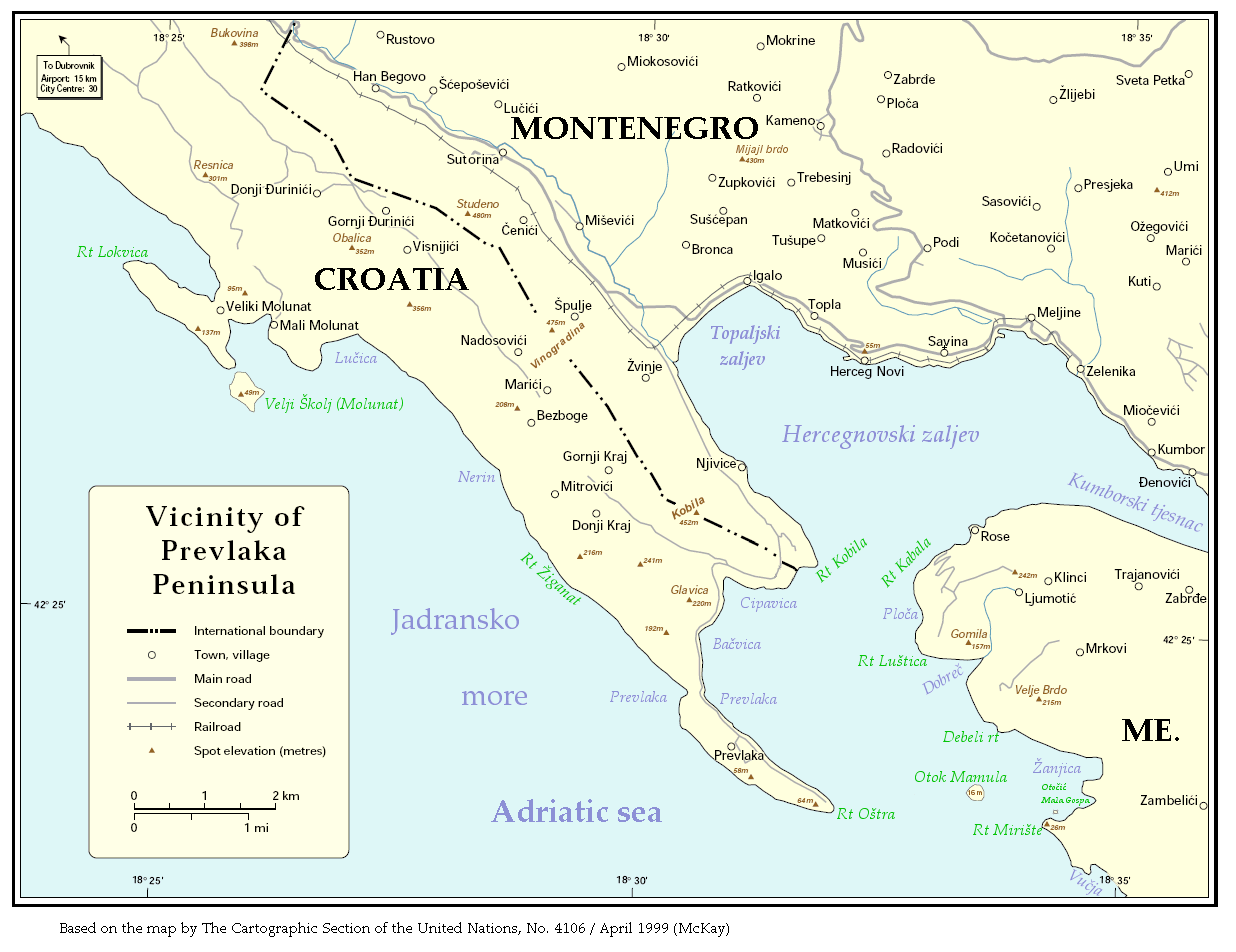
Location of Sutorina.

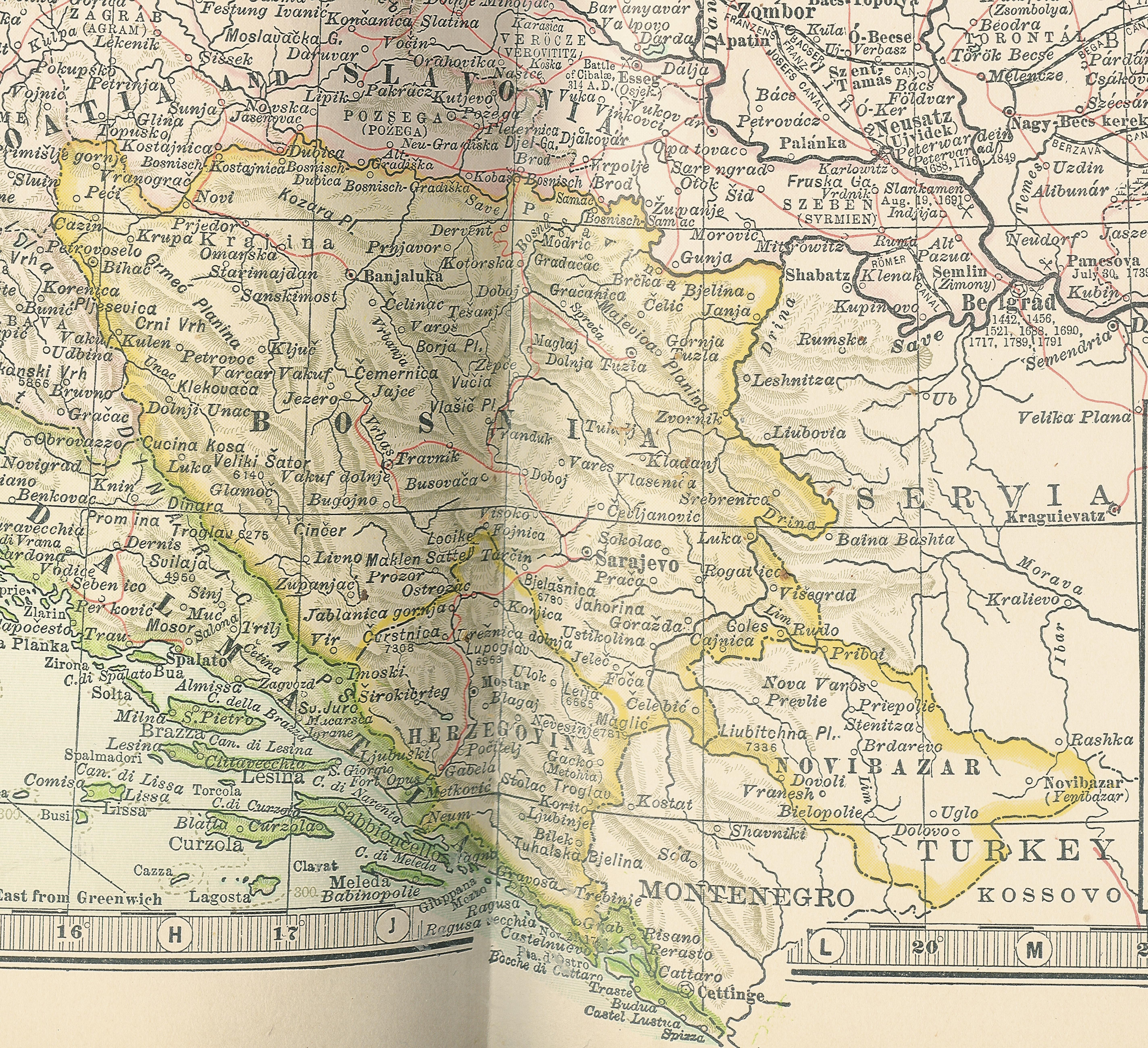
The legal territory of Bosnia and Herzegovina, specified by the Berlin Congress. The map includes Sutorina.

The 5 nmi (9.3 km; 5.8 mi) long coast on the west side of the entrance to the Bay of Kotor, from Cape Kobila to Igalo, known generally as Sutorina, includes the Sutorina valley including 6 villages: Igalo, Sutorina, Sušćepan, Prijevor, Ratiševina and Kruševice, an area of 75 km^{2} (29 sq mi).

Cape Kobila was the boundary between Sutorina and Prevlaka (Konavle) under the control of the Republic of Ragusa since 1699.

This outlet to the sea was the subject of two international treaties: the 1699 Treaty of Carlowitz assigned the region (as well as Neum) to the Ottoman Empire's Bosnia Eyalet (thereby cordoning off the Republic of Ragusa from the Republic of Venice), an arrangement that was subsequently confirmed by the Congress of Berlin in 1878, when it became part of the Austro-Hungarian occupied Bosnia. After World War I, it became part of the Mostar Oblast of the Kingdom of Serbs, Croats and Slovenes, and subsequently the Trebinje district of the Zeta Banovina within the Kingdom of Yugoslavia. In the borders defined at the 2nd AVNOJ meeting in 1943, Sutorina was included within PR Bosnia and Herzegovina.

After World War II, in 1947 when the Federal People's Republic of Yugoslavia authorities were deciding on the internal borders of the constituent republics, Sutorina became part of the constituent People's Republic of Montenegro. Reportedly, this came about as a land swap deal brokered between local communist politicians — Avdo Humo and Đuro Pucar representing the People's Republic of Bosnia and Herzegovina on one side and Blažo Jovanović representing PR Montenegro on the other — who made the agreement with the permission of Josip Broz Tito and Vladimir Bakarić. PR Bosnia and Herzegovina ceded the territory near Sutorina, Igalo and Njivice and received territory east of Sutjeska river, including the Maglić mountain villages of Kruševo and Vučevo. Milovan Đilas as the president of "Commission for borders" advocated that Sutorina should belong to the People's Republic of Montenegro. It is assumed that he had Tito's support.

== Early 21st century ==
Since the mid-2000s, several politicians in Bosnia and Herzegovina such as Željko Komšić and Haris Silajdžić have sporadically called for the "return of Sutorina within Bosnia-Herzegovina's borders". Bosnia and Herzegovina currently only has access to the international waters from the Neum bay across Croatian internal waters. In 2008, Bishop Grigorije of the Eparchy of Zahumlje and Herzegovina formally requested that the authorities of Bosnia and Herzegovina join the international arbitration regarding the coastline near Igalo. The Serb People's Party (Montenegro) released a statement saying if Montenegro cedes Prevlaka to Croatia, they should also cede Sutorina to Bosnia and Herzegovina. In 2009, the mayor of Trebinje, Božidar Vučurević claimed Sutorina was part of Bosnia and Herzegovina.

In 2014 the president of the Non-governmental organization AntiDayton Nihad Aličković issued several stances on Sutorina dispute and directly claiming it as a part of Bosnia and Herzegovina. Hundreds of non-governmental organizations raised the question of Sutorina on a national level. The main goal was to get Sutorina back as it was in the territory of Bosnia and Herzegovina as specified at the Berlin Congress in 1878. On 24 December, minister Denis Bećirović in the Parliamentary Assembly of Bosnia and Herzegovina issued a proposal for a resolution about Sutorina since the session to be held on 15 January had an act for giving Sutorina to Montenegro. The resolution was intended to stop that process and to turn everything to negotiations or to the court. Shortly after, the head of the AntiDayton organization Nihad Aličković started a new organization called the Sutorina initiative aiming to recover the territory of Sutorina. They stated that the only way to see an end in the dispute was to bring the case to the International Court of Justice in The Hague.

On 23 January 2015, the president of Montenegro Filip Vujanović recalled the Montenegrin ambassador to Bosnia and Herzegovina, saying that it was unacceptable that Bosnia and Herzegovina has such claims. Bosnian officials said that the move confirmed Montenegrin inability to prove that it has any rights on that territory. On 24 February a discussion was held in the Parliamentary Assembly of Bosnia and Herzegovina where officials, academics, generals and other high ranked citizens decided that Sutorina needs to be returned to Bosnia and Herzegovina as specified by numerous facts in favor of their demands. On 25 February member of US Congress Mike Turner sent a letter of warning to Bosniak member of Presidency of Bosnia and Herzegovina Bakir Izetbegović stating that if Bosnia did not resolve the Sutorina dispute, the United States could suspend aid to Bosnia. On 10 March the Council of Bosniak Intellectuals held a meeting in Sarajevo about the Sutorina question. Former president of the Federation of Bosnia and Herzegovina Omer Ibrahimagić stated: "This is the first time that Bosnia and Herzegovina is deciding about its borders in the last 552 years". Additionally he said that Bosnia and Herzegovina entered Yugoslavia with Sutorina in its borders and she should have left with it. About the possibility of suing Montenegro in front of the International court he said: "Croatia, Slovenia and Serbia are going to appear in front of the International Court of Justice about their border disputes, so why should Bosnia just give up Sutorina?" On 26 August, the governments of Bosnia and Herzegovina and Montenegro signed in Vienna a border agreement which gave sovereignty over Sutorina to Montenegro. The Parliament of Montenegro ratified the agreement on 28 December, and the Presidency of Bosnia and Herzegovina ratified it on 12 January 2016. The agreement came into effect on 20 April.

== See also ==
- Politics of Bosnia and Herzegovina
- Foreign relations of Bosnia and Herzegovina
- Foreign relations of Montenegro
- Accession of Bosnia and Herzegovina to the European Union

== Sources ==
- Blake, Gerald Henry; Topalović, Duško (1996). Clive H. Schofield; Mladen Klemenčić (eds.). The maritime boundaries of the Adriatic Sea. IBRU. pp. 42–43. ISBN 978-1-897643-22-8.
