= List of twin towns and sister cities in Serbia =

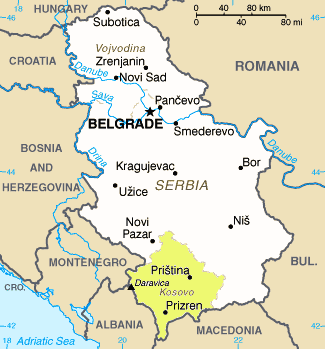
Map of Serbia

This is a list of municipalities in Serbia which have standing links to local communities in other countries known as "town twinning" (usually in Europe) or "sister cities" (usually in the rest of the world).

== A ==
Ada

- Bogyiszló, Hungary
- Budakalász, Hungary
- Inárcs, Hungary
- Joseni, Romania
- Makó, Hungary
- Nemesnádudvar, Hungary
- Újbuda (Budapest), Hungary

Aleksinac

- Aiani, Greece
- Hisarya, Bulgaria
- Laurium, Greece
- Probištip, North Macedonia
- Zagorje ob Savi, Slovenia

Aranđelovac

- Han Pijesak, Bosnia and Herzegovina
- Kavala, Greece
- Ptuj, Slovenia
- Turčianske Teplice, Slovakia

== B ==
Bačka Topola

- Belváros-Lipótváros (Budapest), Hungary
- Gheorgheni, Romania
- Herceg Novi, Montenegro
- Kiskunmajsa, Hungary
- Orahovica, Croatia
- Rožňava, Slovakia
- Szentes, Hungary

Bački Petrovac

- Babušnica, Serbia
- Kirchheim unter Teck, Germany
- Martin, Slovakia
- Nitra, Slovakia
- Ružomberok, Slovakia
- Stará Ľubovňa, Slovakia
- Vukovar, Croatia

Bečej

- Banovići, Bosnia and Herzegovina
- Csongrád, Hungary
- Galanta, Slovakia
- Istra, Russia
- Miercurea Ciuc, Romania
- Szekszárd, Hungary

Belgrade

- Banja Luka, Bosnia and Herzegovina
- Chicago, United States
- Corfu, Greece
- Coventry, England, United Kingdom
- Ljubljana, Slovenia
- Shanghai, China
- Xiamen, China

Belgrade – Čukarica

- Berane, Montenegro
- Ervenik, Croatia
- Heraklion, Greece
- Istočno Novo Sarajevo (Istočno Sarajevo), Bosnia and Herzegovina
- Kumanovo, North Macedonia
- Petrovac, Bosnia and Herzegovina
- Thasos, Greece

Belgrade – Mladenovac

- Gornja Radgona, Slovenia
- Ivanovo, Russia

Belgrade – New Belgrade

- Banja Luka, Bosnia and Herzegovina
- Karpoš (Skopje), North Macedonia
- Xanthi, Greece

Belgrade – Palilula

- Gradiška, Bosnia and Herzegovina

Belgrade – Rakovica

- Kamena Vourla, Greece
- Podsused – Vrapče (Zagreb), Croatia

Belgrade – Savski Venac

- Prague 5 (Prague), Czech Republic

Belgrade – Stari Grad

- Bitola, North Macedonia
- Centar (Skopje), North Macedonia
- Erzsébetváros (Budapest), Hungary
- Germasogeia, Cyprus
- Kotor, Montenegro
- Rigas Feraios, Greece
- Stari Grad (Sarajevo), Bosnia and Herzegovina

Belgrade – Zemun

- Banja Luka, Bosnia and Herzegovina
- Esch-sur-Alzette, Luxembourg
- Herceg Novi, Montenegro
- Keqiao (Shaoxing), China
- Kranj, Slovenia
- Mödling, Austria
- Nyasvizh, Belarus
- Offenbach am Main, Germany
- Puteaux, France
- Tilburg, Netherlands
- Velletri, Italy
- Veria, Greece

Beočin

- Battonya, Hungary
- Herceg Novi, Montenegro
- Ugljevik, Bosnia and Herzegovina

Bor

- Bar, Montenegro
- Le Creusot, France
- Khmelnytskyi, Ukraine
- Shanghang County, China
- Vulcan, Romania
- Vratsa, Bulgaria

== C ==
Čačak

- Bratunac, Bosnia and Herzegovina
- Brezno, Slovakia
- Katerini, Greece
- Valašské Meziříčí, Czech Republic

Čoka

- Arilje, Serbia
- Bordány, Hungary
- Decs, Hungary
- Deta, Romania
- Sokobanja, Serbia
- Wisła, Poland

Ćuprija

- Celje, Slovenia
- Doboj, Bosnia and Herzegovina
- Gradiška, Bosnia and Herzegovina

== G ==
Gornji Milanovac

- Blagoevgrad, Bulgaria
- Edessa, Greece
- Kavadarci, North Macedonia
- Kumanovo, North Macedonia
- Nowogard, Poland
- Pleven, Bulgaria
- Požega, Croatia
- Slovenj Gradec, Slovenia
- Staro Nagoričane, North Macedonia
- Starodub, Russia
- Starše, Slovenia
- Trebinje, Bosnia and Herzegovina
- Vefsn, Norway
- Vlasenica, Bosnia and Herzegovina

== I ==
Inđija

- Gevgelija, North Macedonia
- Jablanica, Bosnia and Herzegovina
- Ohrid, North Macedonia
- Paderno Dugnano, Italy
- Al-Salt, Jordan

== J ==
Jagodina

- Chrysoupoli, Greece
- Corinth, Greece
- Delčevo, North Macedonia
- Dubica, Bosnia and Herzegovina
- Kassandreia, Greece
- Marsa Alam, Egypt
- Novi Pazar, Serbia
- Perdika, Greece

== K ==
Kanjiža

- Budaörs, Hungary
- Felsőzsolca, Hungary
- Ferencváros (Budapest), Hungary
- Kiskunhalas, Hungary
- Kráľovský Chlmec, Slovakia
- Nagykanizsa, Hungary
- Röszke, Hungary
- Sfântu Gheorghe, Romania
- Svilajnac, Serbia
- Tata, Hungary
- Vodice, Slovenia

Kikinda

- Bihać, Bosnia and Herzegovina
- Jimbolia, Romania
- Kiskunfélegyháza, Hungary
- Kondoros, Hungary
- Medgidia, Romania
- Nagydobos, Hungary
- Narvik, Norway
- Nof HaGalil, Israel
- Prijedor, Bosnia and Herzegovina
- Reşiţa, Romania
- Silistra, Bulgaria
- Szolnok, Hungary
- Žilina, Slovakia

Kladovo

- Hillerød, Denmark

Kragujevac

- Bar, Montenegro
- Bat Yam, Israel
- Bielsko-Biała, Poland
- Bydgoszcz, Poland
- Carrara, Italy
- Ingolstadt, Germany
- Jericho, Palestine
- Karlovac, Croatia
- Milwaukee, United States
- Mogilev, Belarus
- Ohrid, North Macedonia
- Piteşti, Romania
- Reggio Emilia, Italy
- Smolensk, Russia
- Springfield, United States
- Stari Grad (Sarajevo), Bosnia and Herzegovina
- Suncheon, South Korea
- Suresnes, France
- Trenčín, Slovakia
- Xi'an, China

Kraljevo

- Gjorče Petrov (Skopje), North Macedonia
- Grodno, Belarus
- Ivanovo, Russia
- Lod, Israel
- Maribor, Slovenia
- Niagara Falls, Canada
- North Mitrovica, Kosovo
- Plužine, Montenegro
- South Euclid, United States
- Uvarovo, Russia
- Zielona Góra, Poland

Krupanj

- Istočno Novo Sarajevo (Istočno Sarajevo), Bosnia and Herzegovina

Kruševac

- Bijeljina, Bosnia and Herzegovina
- Corfu, Greece
- Kiryat Gat, Israel
- Novopolotsk, Belarus
- Odintsovo, Russia
- Pistoia, Italy
- Râmnicu Vâlcea, Romania
- Szentendre, Hungary
- Volgograd, Russia

Kula

- Bar, Montenegro
- Kalocsa, Hungary

== L ==
Leskovac

- Bijeljina, Bosnia and Herzegovina
- Elin Pelin, Bulgaria
- Kumanovo, North Macedonia
- Kyustendil, Bulgaria
- Lanzhou, China
- Plovdiv, Bulgaria
- Silistra, Bulgaria

Loznica

- Płock, Poland

== M ==
Mali Iđoš

- Bar, Montenegro
- Cetinje, Montenegro
- Gádoros, Hungary
- Sokobanja, Serbia
- Solnechnogorsk, Russia

== N ==
Niš

- Beersheba, Israel
- Belgorod, Russia
- Glyfada, Greece
- Istočno Sarajevo, Bosnia and Herzegovina
- Kaluga, Russia
- Košice, Slovakia
- Kursk, Russia
- Saltdal, Norway
- Vasileostrovsky (Saint Petersburg), Russia
- Veliko Tarnovo, Bulgaria
- Vitebsk, Belarus

Novi Pazar

- Bayrampaşa, Turkey
- Bursa, Turkey
- Jagodina, Serbia
- Karatay, Turkey
- Kocaeli, Turkey
- Novi Pazar, Bulgaria
- Pendik, Turkey
- Vranje, Serbia
- Yalova, Turkey

Novi Sad

- Alexandria, Egypt
- Budva, Montenegro
- Changchun, China
- Cleveland, United States
- Corfu, Greece
- Dortmund, Germany
- Gomel, Belarus
- Ilioupoli, Greece
- Istočno Sarajevo, Bosnia and Herzegovina
- Kumanovo, North Macedonia
- Modena, Italy
- Nizhny Novgorod, Russia
- Norwich, England, United Kingdom
- Pécs, Hungary
- Taverny, France
- Timișoara, Romania
- Tivat, Montenegro
- Toluca, Mexico

== P ==
Pančevo

- Bonyhád, Hungary
- Boulogne-Billancourt, France
- Byala Slatina, Bulgaria
- Kumanovo, North Macedonia
- Michalovce, Slovakia
- Mrkonjić Grad, Bosnia and Herzegovina
- Neapoli, Greece
- Prijedor, Bosnia and Herzegovina
- Ravenna Province, Italy
- Reşiţa, Romania
- Stavroupoli, Greece
- Stupino, Russia
- Voskresensk, Russia

Paraćin

- Jablanica, Bosnia and Herzegovina
- Kotor Varoš, Bosnia and Herzegovina
- Krapina, Croatia
- Murska Sobota, Slovenia
- Pazin, Croatia
- Perdika, Greece
- Pljevlja, Montenegro

Požarevac

- Bar, Montenegro
- Bitola, North Macedonia
- Reșița, Romania
- Volokolamsk, Russia

== S ==
Šabac

- Argostoli, Greece
- Celje, Slovenia
- Fujimi, Japan
- Kiryat Ata, Israel
- Kralupy nad Vltavou, Czech Republic

Senta

- Budavár (Budapest), Hungary
- Cristuru Secuiesc, Romania
- Csorvás, Hungary
- Dabas, Hungary
- Dunajská Streda, Slovakia
- Dunaszentgyörgy, Hungary
- Gödöllő, Hungary
- Hódmezővásárhely, Hungary
- Kaszaper, Hungary
- Kranj, Slovenia
- Medijana (Niš), Serbia
- Mukachevo, Ukraine
- Tiszafüred, Hungary
- Törökszentmiklós, Hungary

Smederevo

- Pale (Istočno Sarajevo), Bosnia and Herzegovina
- Tangshan, China
- Volos, Greece
- Zhlobin, Belarus

Sombor

- Baja, Hungary
- Celje, Slovenia
- Kispest (Budapest), Hungary
- Veles, North Macedonia

Sremska Mitrovica

- Banja Luka, Bosnia and Herzegovina
- Dunaújváros, Hungary

Sremski Karlovci

- Bardejov, Slovakia
- Karpoš (Skopje), North Macedonia
- Tivat, Montenegro

Stara Pazova

- Hlinsko, Czech Republic
- Púchov, Slovakia

Subotica

- Brest, Belarus
- Dunajská Streda, Slovakia
- Kiskunhalas, Hungary
- Odorheiu Secuiesc, Romania
- Olomouc, Czech Republic
- Osijek, Croatia
- Szeged, Hungary

== T ==
Tutin

- Gaziosmanpaşa, Turkey
- İznik, Turkey
- Mostar, Bosnia and Herzegovina

== U ==
Užice

- Cassino, Italy
- Harbin, China
- Kursk, Russia
- Ljutomer, Slovenia
- Veles, North Macedonia

== V ==
Valjevo

- Pfaffenhofen an der Ilm, Germany
- Prievidza, Slovakia
- Rehovot, Israel
- Świdnik, Poland
- Velenje, Slovenia

Velika Plana

- Budva, Montenegro
- Radoviš, North Macedonia

Vranje

- Brod, Bosnia and Herzegovina
- Bryukhovetsky District, Russia
- Cetinje, Montenegro
- Kumanovo, North Macedonia
- Leposavić, Kosovo
- Novi Pazar, Serbia
- Trikala, Greece

== Z ==
Žagubica

- Piotrków Trybunalski, Poland

Zrenjanin

- Arad, Romania
- Békéscsaba, Hungary
- Bijeljina, Bosnia and Herzegovina
- Laktaši, Bosnia and Herzegovina
- Noginsk, Russia
- Trebinje, Bosnia and Herzegovina
- Yantai, China
