= Russians in Bulgaria =

Russian in Bulgaria
- (Bulgaria) (Russia)

Total population
- 31,679 (2019)

Regions with significant populations
- Sofia: 3,127; Varna Province: 1,358; Plovdiv Province: 1,151; Burgas Province: 1,107

Languages
- Bulgarian, Russian

Religion
- Orthodox

Related ethnic groups
- Russian diaspora
- All figures from

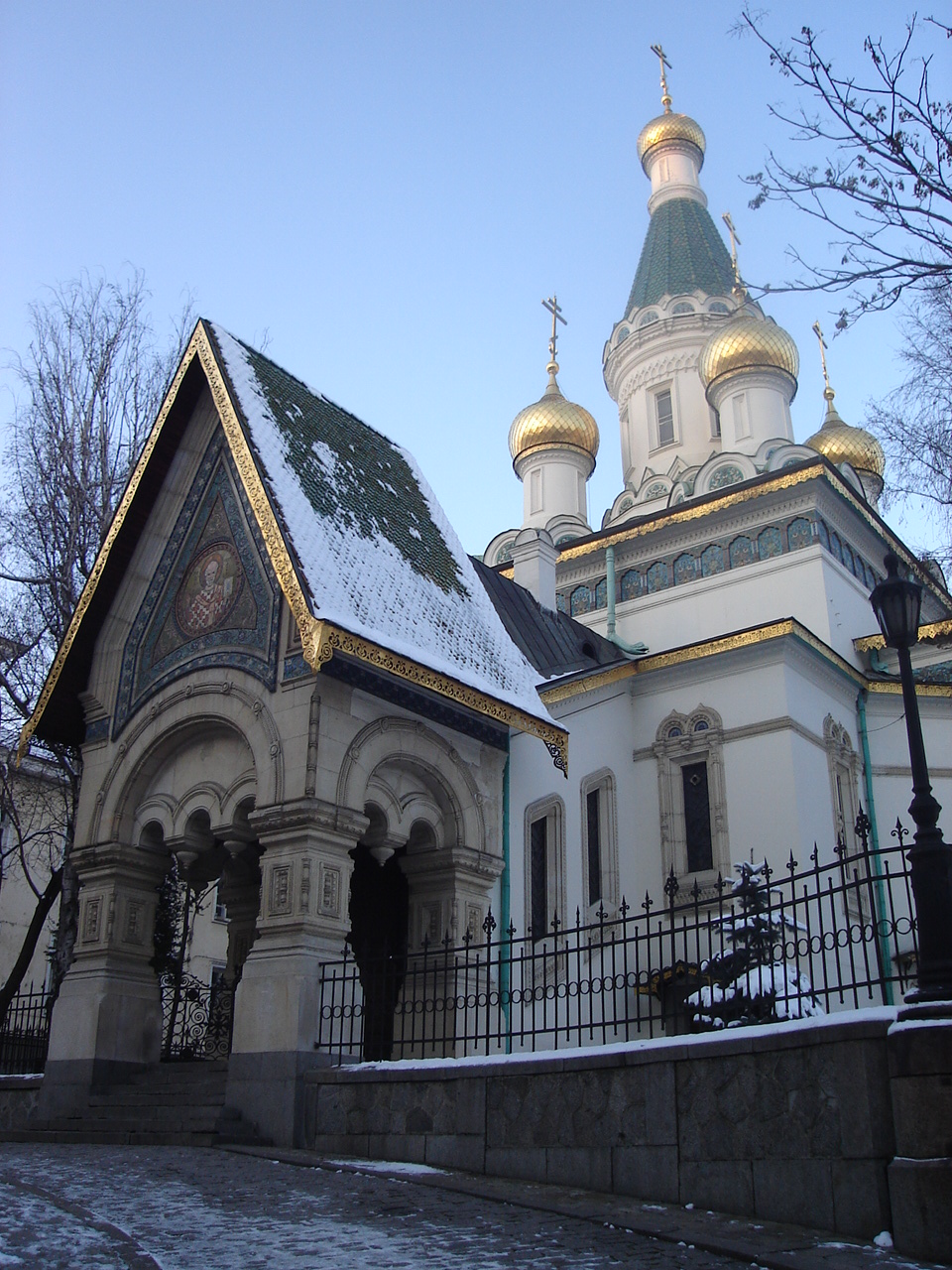
The Russian Church in Sofia, Bulgaria

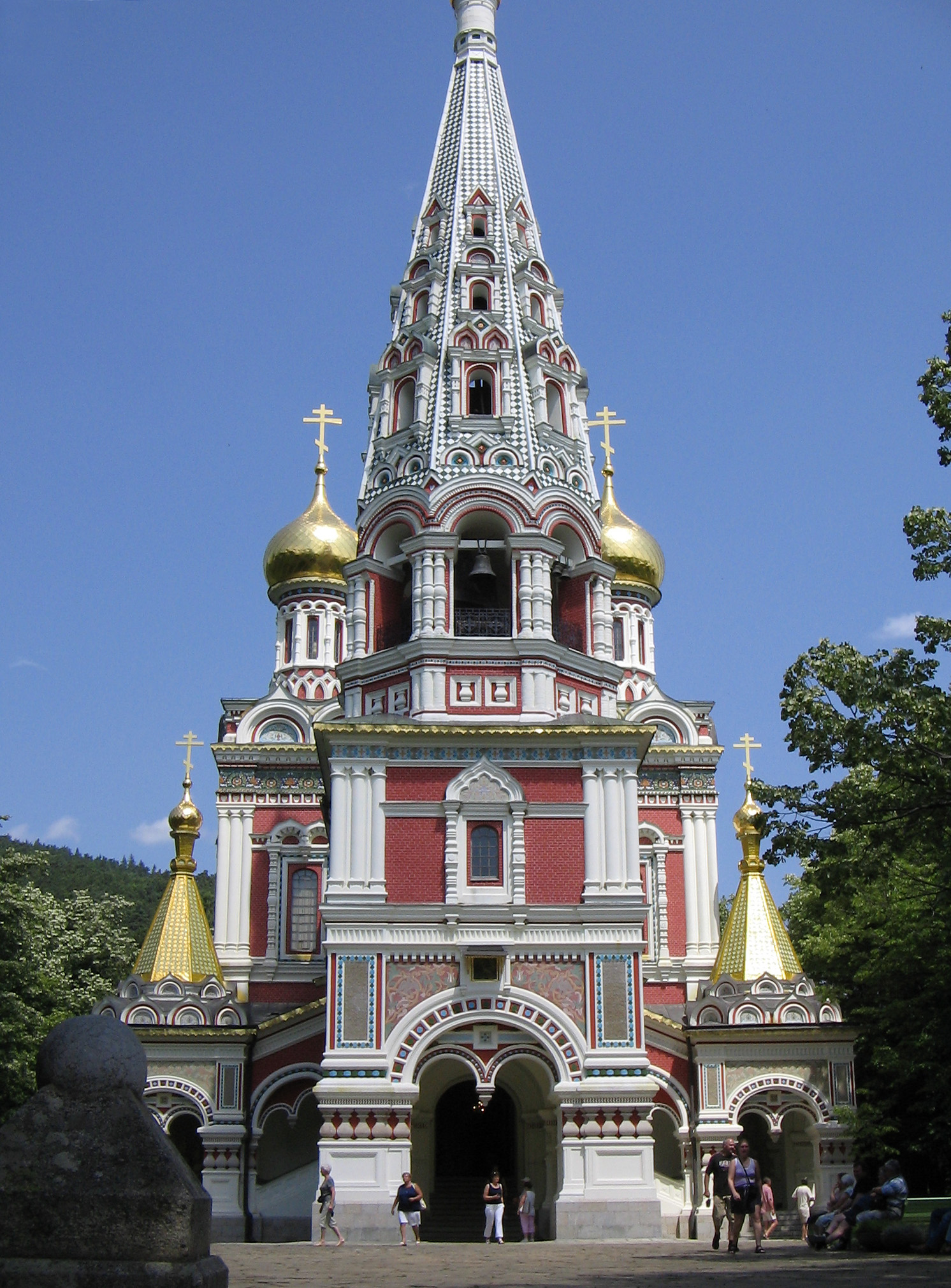
The Muscovite-style Shipka Memorial Church

Russians (Bulgarian: руснаци, rusnatsi) form the fourth largest ethnic group in Bulgaria, numbering 31,679 in 2019, and mostly living in the large urban centres, such as Sofia, Plovdiv, Varna and Burgas. Although the largest wave of Russian settlers (White Guards) arrived following the events surrounding the October Revolution and the Russian Civil War, compact groups of Russians had been living in Bulgaria for centuries before that.

Among the early Russian settlers were Old Believer Nekrasov Cossacks, some of which founded the village of Tataritsa in then-Ottoman-ruled Southern Dobruja (nowadays part of the village of Aydemir in Silistra Province) in 1674, building a church in 1750. Another Russian-inhabited village in the northeast of Bulgaria is Kazashko in Varna Province, where descendants of Kuban and Don Cossacks have been living since 1905. The members of these Old Believer communities are locally known as Lipovans (липованци, lipovantsi) and belong to a group also inhabiting Romania and Ukraine. Their main occupation is fishing, in the Danube for the Lipovans in Tataritsa and in Lake Varna for those in Kazashko.

Following the Russo-Turkish War of 1877-78, largely fought on what is today Bulgarian territory, and the Liberation of Bulgaria to which it led in 1878, a transitional Russian administration was established with Prince Alexander Mikhailovich Dondukov-Korsakov as its head.

Following their defeat by the Red Guards in the Russian Civil War, many White Guards fled to Bulgaria (then a monarchy) seeking refuge. They initially numbered around 24–29,000, but some 4,000 received amnesty and returned to the Soviet Union and many others were expelled under Aleksandar Stamboliyski. With Bulgaria becoming part of the Eastern bloc following World War II, a number of Russians emigrated to the country. Today, foreign (including Russian) businessmen living in Bulgaria are eligible for Bulgarian passport under specific conditions (such as investing over $250,000 or running a business, and having a clean slate).

Nowadays, Russians in Bulgaria are represented by a number of organizations, such as Soyuz sootechestvenikov (Union of Compatriots), the Union of Russian Citizens and the Society of White Guardsmen.

== See also ==
- Bulgaria–Russia relations
- Demographics of Bulgaria
- Russian diaspora
- Bulgarians in Russia
- White émigré
- Russians in Greece
- Russians in Romania
- Russians in Serbia
- Russians in Turkey
