= Sratsimir (disambiguation) =

Sratsimir was a Bulgarian magnate with the title of Despot, holding the territory of Kran.

Sratsimir or Sracimir may also refer to:

- Ivan Sratsimir of Bulgaria, emperor (tsar) of Bulgaria in Vidin from 1356 to 1396
- Sratsimir dynasty, Bulgarian dynasty
- Sratsimir Hill, hill in Graham Land, Antarctica
- Sratsimirovo, village in Gramada Municipality, Bulgaria
- Sratsimir (village), a village in Silistra Municipality, Silistra Province, Bulgaria
