= University of Montenegro Faculty of Applied Physiotherapy =

- Fakultet primijenjene fizioterapije Univerziteta Crne Gore
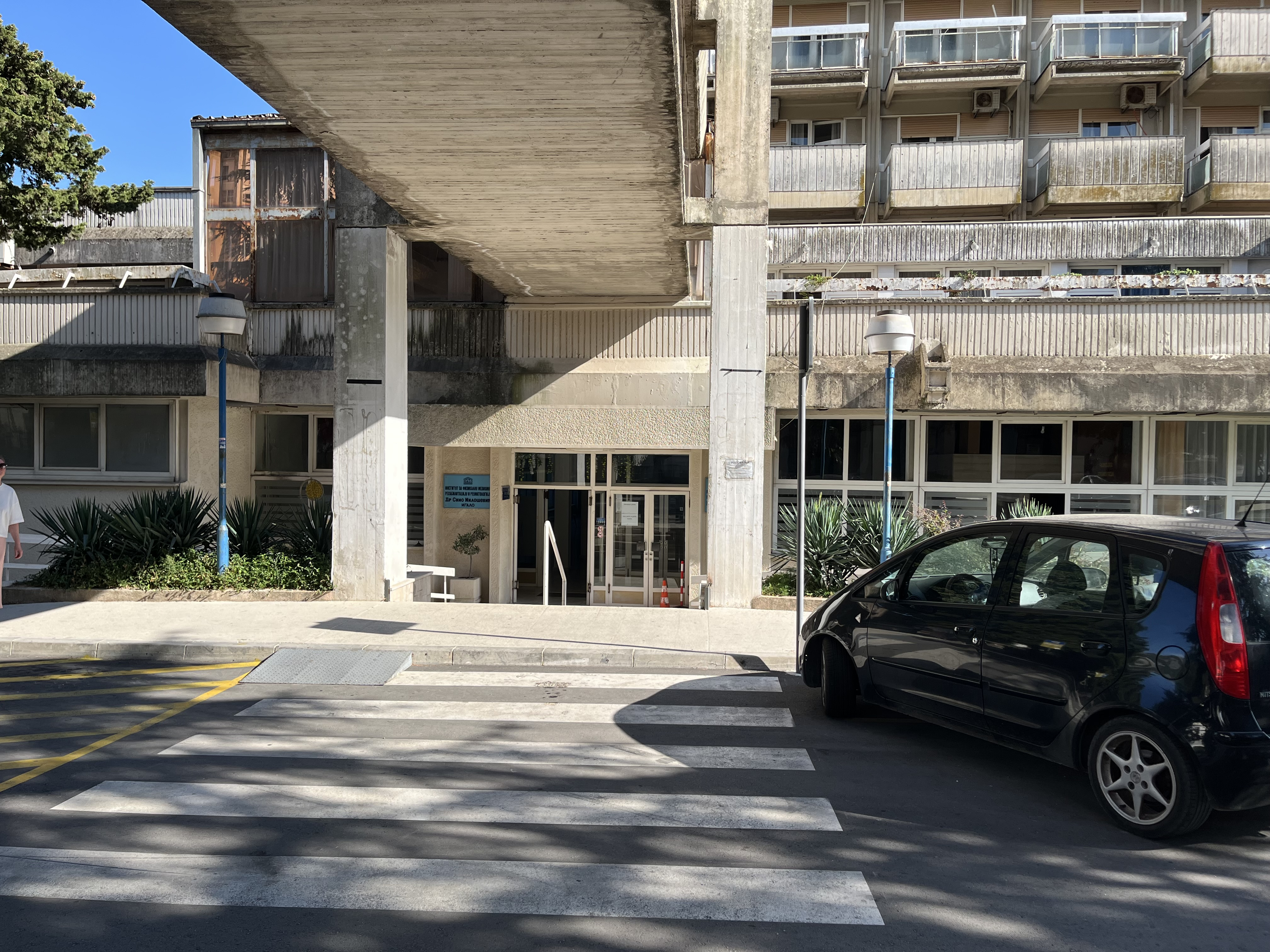
- Type: Public
- Established: 2005
- Affiliations: University of Montenegro
- Dean: Sofija Žitnik-Sivački
- Location: Igalo, Montenegro; 42.458515°N 18.513313°E
- Campus: Urban
- Website: www.fpft.ac.me

The University of Montenegro Faculty of Applied Physiotherapy (Montenegrin: Fakultet primijenjene fizioterapije Факултет примијењене физиотерапије) is one of the educational institutions of the University of Montenegro. The building is located in Igalo, and the Faculty is the only physical therapy school in Montenegro and the region.

== History ==
In 1976, the High School of Physiotherapy was founded in Igalo as a two-year post-secondary school.

In compliance with the new Law on Higher Education, the Post-secondary School of Physiotherapy was transformed into a Higher School of Physiotherapy in 2004 and one year later was renamed the Faculty of Applied Physiotherapy as an organizational unit of the University of Montenegro.
