= Silistra Municipality =

Silistra Municipality Община Силистра
- Municipality
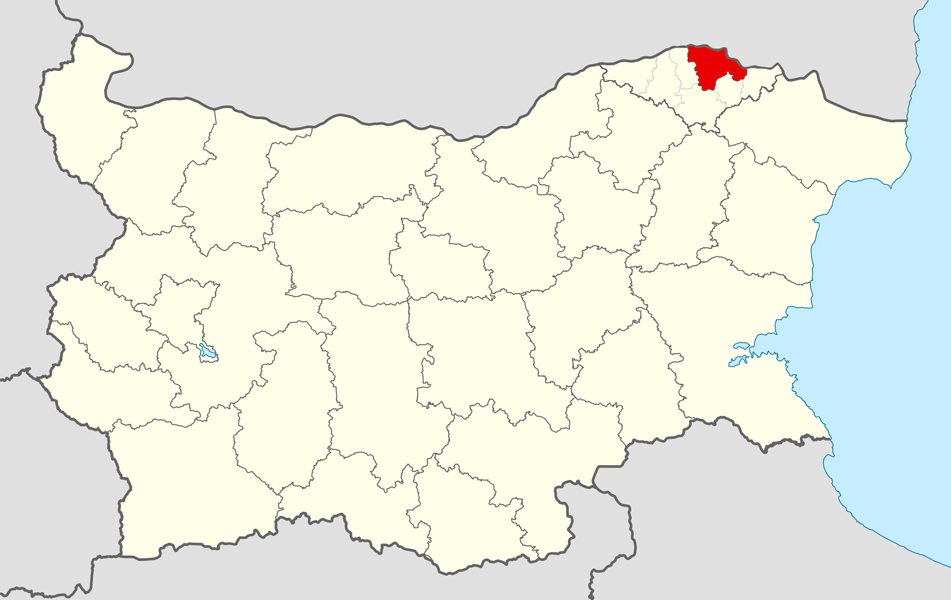
- Silistra Municipality within Bulgaria and Silistra Province.
- Coordinates: 44°2′N 27°13′E
- Country: Bulgaria
- Province (Oblast): Silistra
- Admin. centre (Obshtinski tsentar): Silistra

Area
  - Total: 515.89 km^{2} (199.19 sq mi)

Population (December 2009)
  - Total: 54,885
  - Density: 106.39/km^{2} (275.55/sq mi)
- Time zone: UTC+2 (EET)
  - Summer (DST): UTC+3 (EEST)

Silistra Municipality (Bulgarian: Община Силистра) is a municipality (obshtina) in Silistra Province, Northeastern Bulgaria, located along the right bank of Danube river, in the Danubian Plain, bounded by Romania to the northeast and north beyond the river. It is named after its administrative centre - the city of Silistra which is also the capital of the province.

The municipality has a territory of 515.89 km^{2} (199.19 sq mi). As of December 2009, it had a population of 54,885.

Aside from the historical heritage of the main town, the area is best known with the Srebarna Nature Reserve around the lake of the same name. The main roads I-7, II-21 and II-71 crosses the municipality, connecting the province centre of Silistra with the cities of Shumen, Ruse and Dobrich.

== Settlements ==
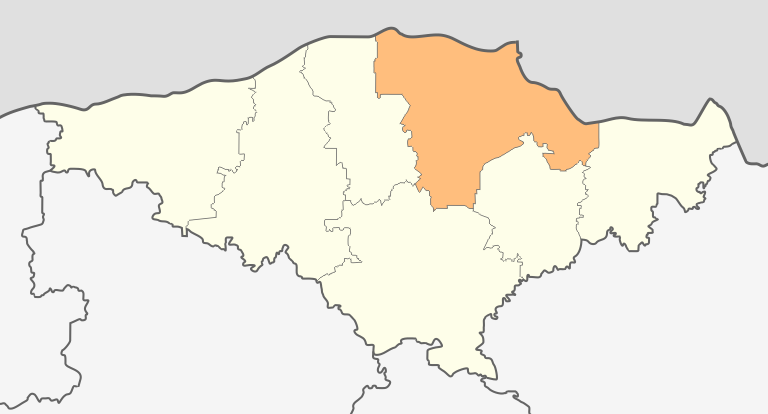
Silistra Municipality within Silistra Province

Silistra Municipality includes the following 19 places (towns are shown in bold):

Town/Village	Cyrillic	Population (December 2009) (December 2009)
**Silistra**	**Силистра**	37,837
Aydemir	Айдемир	6,655
Babuk	Бабук	580
Bogorovo	Богорово	82
Bradvari	Брадвари	1,022
Balgarka	Българка	150
Glavan	Главан	104
Kazimir	Казимир	138
Kalipetrovo	Калипетрово	4,592
Polkovnik Lambrinovo	Полковник Ламбриново	109
Popkralevo	Попкралево	83
Profesor Ishirkovo	Професор Иширково	1,171
Smilets	Смилец	439
Sratsimir	Срацимир	327
Srebarna	Сребърна	689
Sarpovo	Сърпово	56
Tsenovich	Ценович	53
Vetren	Ветрен	217
Yordanovo	Йорданово	581
Total		54,885

== Demography ==
The following table shows the change of the population during the last four decades. Since 1992 Silistra Municipality has comprised the former municipality of Profesor Ishirkovo and the numbers in the table reflect this unification.

Silistra Municipality
**Year**	1975	1985	1992	**2001**	2005	2007	2009	**2011**
**Population**	63,738	71,173	71,889	61,942	57,802	56,422	54,885	...
Sources: Census 2001, Census 2011, „pop-stat.mashke.org“,

=== Ethnic groups ===
Ethnic Bulgarians constitute the largest ethnic group in Silistra Municipality. Turks constitute a large minority. There is also a relatively small Roma community.

Ethnic groups in Silistra Municipality (2011 census)
Ethnic group	Percentage
Bulgarians	84.1%
Turks	12.9%
Roma	1.9%
others and indefinable	1.1%

== See also ==
- Provinces of Bulgaria
- Municipalities of Bulgaria
- List of cities and towns in Bulgaria
