= Kalipetrovo =

- Village
- Interactive map of Kalipetrovo
- Coordinates: 44.0830002°N 27.2329998°E
- Country: Bulgaria
- Province: Silistra Province
- Municipality: Silistra Municipality

Area
  - Total: 48.574 km^{2} (18.755 sq mi)

Population (2011)
  - Total: 4,266

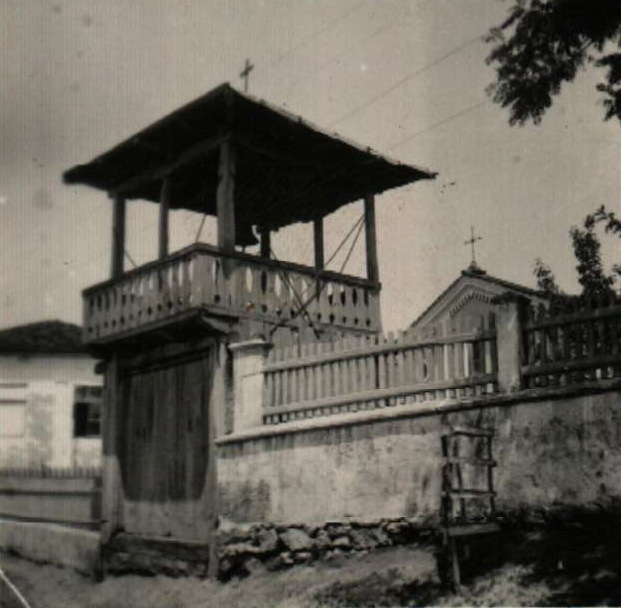

Kalipetrovo, previously named Stanchevo, is a village located in Silistra Municipality in north-eastern Bulgaria. Its area is 48.574 kilometers squared, making it the second largest village in the district. A census in 2001 determined that the village's population was 5,361 at the time, and the 2011 census determined that it was 4,266. The estimated population in December 2017 was 3,804. About 76% of the village's citizens are Bulgarians, with the majority of the remaining citizens being either Turkish or Romani people.
