= FK Boka Metal Sutorina =

- Full name: Fudbalski Klub Boka Metal Sutorina
- Founded: 2006
- Ground: Stadion FK Boka Metal Sutorina
- Capacity: 300
- Chairman: Dragan Brajević
- Manager: Vojin Miljanić
- League: Montenegrin Third League
Home colours	Away colours

FK Boka Metal Sutorina are a football club from Sutorina, Montenegro. They don't play in any competition since 2008, due to financial problems and all the players left the club. Club currently has only a young team.

== See also ==
- FK Boka Metal Sutorina stadion on Sutorinsko Polje at Panoramio
