= AntiDayton =

AntiDayton AntiDayton Pokret
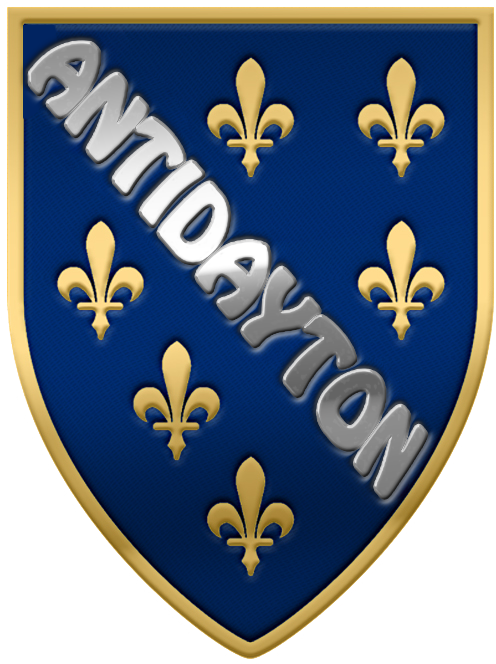
- Abbreviation: ADP
- Founded: April 23, 2012
- Headquarters: Not registered - Sarajevo, Bosnia and Herzegovina (informal)
- Ideology: Bosnian nationalism; Centralism; Conservatism
- Religion: Non-denominational
- Colors: Royal blue, white, gold

Website
- www.antidayton.com

AntiDayton is a patriotic movement and advocacy group in Bosnia and Herzegovina that promotes the restoration of the legal 1992 constitution, with the goals of creating a unitary state (citizen's constitution without ethnic divisions and internal borders) governed under one president, promoting Bosnian-Herzegovinian heritage, strong opposition against the Dayton Agreement, and advocating for remembrance of genocide victims from the 1991–1995 Bosnian War and campaigning for truth and justice against war criminals.

== History ==
AntiDayton started as a grassroots activist organisation among local and diaspora Bosnians (especially Bosniaks), with its base on the worldwide social media platform Facebook. It was organized around the concept that the Dayton Agreement, which ended the Bosnian War and provided the current structure and constitution of Bosnia and Herzegovina, was a total failure and an illegal abrogation of the Constitution of the wartime Republic of Bosnia and Herzegovina. Returning to the previous constitution would have abolished the entities of Federation of Bosnia and Herzegovina, Brčko District and Republika Srpska, from which the group sees as only promoting internal divisions and ethnic tensions. The group's first public gathering was in the Sarajevo, under the slogan "Let's bury Dayton, under the ground and concrete!"

== Activism ==
Since 2012, AntiDayton has organized commemorations of historic events (placing the flag of the medieval kingdom of Bosnia in Bobovac), patriotic group field trips (seeing Bosnian Queen Catherine of Bosnia, raising funds for humanitarian causes, visiting the forgotten war patriots, distributing presents for (returning refugees) kids in need, being there during times of natural disasters (2014 Bosnia-Herzegovina floods), fundraising for construction of victim memorials (Nermin Divović - Sarajevo), advocacy for the return of the land grab and case of Sutorina dispute, commemorating genocide burials throughout Bosnia (Flag draping over victims coffins in Srebrenica), advocating solutions through multimedia show appearances (TV A1, Alpha TV, N1 TV, BHTVNY, BosTel, Radio Naša Riječ), standing up for wrongfully charged and innocent Bosnian leaders (e.g. Jovan Divjak, Naser Orić, Atif Dudaković, Dragan Vikić, Jusuf Pušina...), protesting civil injustice (closing of the National Museum, genocide denial, Russia involvement in Bosnian war crimes), and appearing at the International Criminal Tribunal for the former Yugoslavia sentencing of Bosnian Serb and Croat war criminals and standing with Bosniak victims in support.
