= Aydemir =

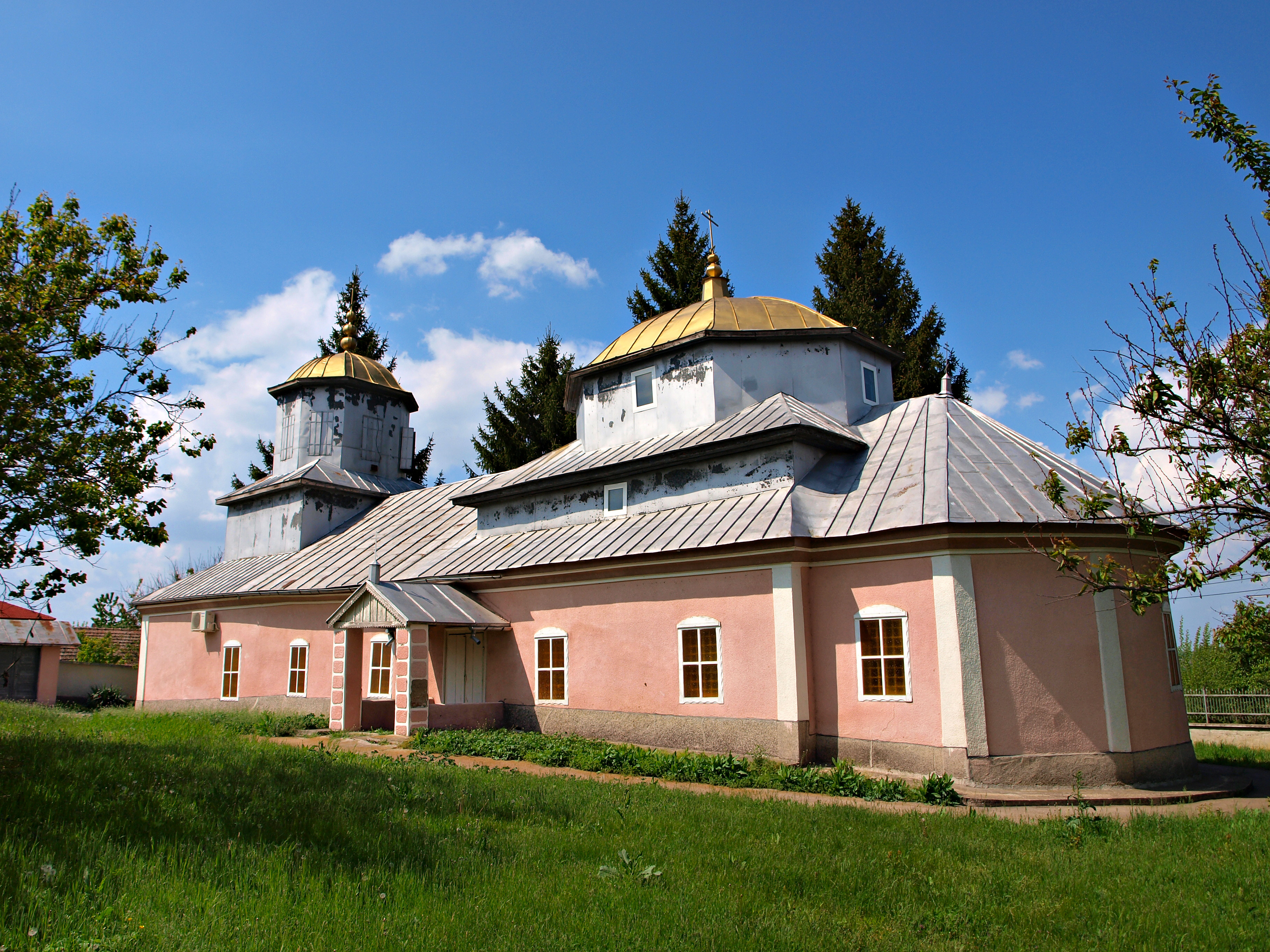
The Old Believer Lipovan Russian church in Tataritsa, Aydemir

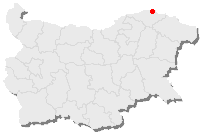
Location of Aydemir in Bulgaria

Aydemir (Bulgarian: Айдемир, also Aidemir, Ajdemir) is a village in northeastern Bulgaria, part of Silistra Municipality, Silistra Province. Aydemir had 5711 inhabitants in 2016, down from 9095 short after the fall of communism in 1992. It is the second most populous village in Bulgaria: the village of Lozen took the lead as its population grew to 6252 people while Aydemir lost many inhabitants in the same period. Aydemir lies at, 31 m above sea level. The village is located in the valley of the Danube, 3 km south of the river and 8 km west of Silistra, on the road from Silistra to Rousse. The mayor is Rumen Angelov.

Aydemir is divided into three parts: the centre, the quarter of Delenkite, and the quarter of Tataritsa, which was founded in 1674 by Old Believer Nekrasov Cossacks (see Russians in Bulgaria) at a location prior to that inhabited by Tatars. Tataritsa is now one of the only two Lipovan villages in Bulgaria, the other being Kazashko.

The village has a church, the Church of the Holy Trinity, which was constructed in 1829. For a certain period, it was named Knyaz Hesenski (Княз Хесенски, "Grand Duke of Hesse") in honour of Alexander I Battenberg, the first monarch of modern Bulgaria.

According to Ancho Kaloyanov, the name of the village is derived from Greek άγιος (agios, "Saint") and the shortening of the personal name Demetrius, i.e. "Saint Demetrius", both through Turkic.

In 1924, a 14th-century treasure comprising 101 silver coins, including some of Tsar Ivan Alexander of Bulgaria, was discovered near the village.
