= Kuti, Herceg Novi =

Village in Herceg Novi, Montenegro

Kuti Кути
- Village
- Location within Montenegro
- Coordinates: 42.461305°N 18.580978°E
- Country: Montenegro
- Region: Coastal
- Municipality: Herceg Novi

Population (2011)
  - Total: 729
- Time zone: UTC+1 (CET)
  - Summer (DST): UTC+2 (CEST)

Kuti (Montenegrin: Кути) is a village in the municipality of Herceg Novi, Montenegro.

== Demographics ==
According to the 2011 census, its population was 729.

Ethnicity in 2011
Ethnicity	Number	Percentage
Serbs	457	62.7%
Montenegrins	164	22.5%
Roma	8	1.1%
other/undeclared	100	13.7%
Total	729	100%
