= Zelenika, Herceg Novi =

Village in Herceg Novi, Montenegro

Zelenika Зеленика
- Village
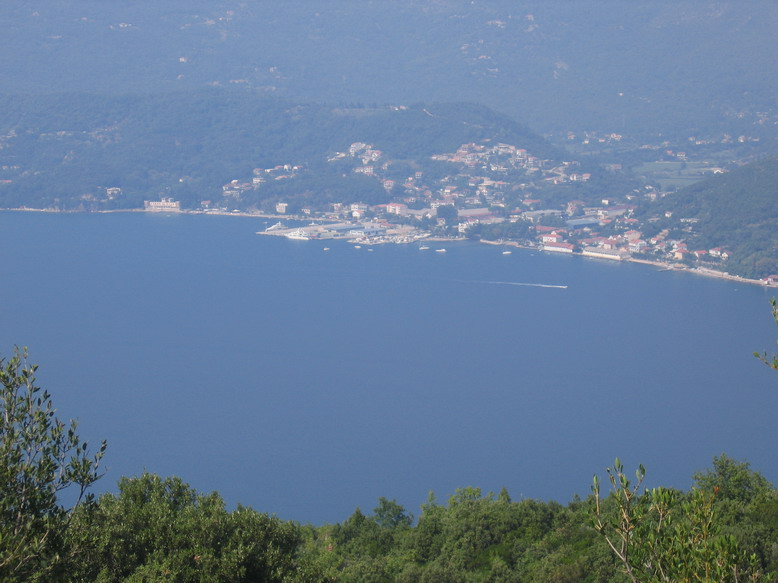

- Location within Montenegro
- Coordinates: 42°27′06″N 18°34′36″E
- Country: Montenegro
- Region: Coastal
- Municipality: Herceg Novi

Population (2011)
  - Total: 1,431
- Time zone: UTC+1 (CET)
  - Summer (DST): UTC+2 (CEST)

Zelenika (Montenegrin: Зеленика / Zelenika) is a village in the municipality of Herceg Novi, Montenegro.

== Demographics ==
According to the 2011 census, its population was 1,431.

Ethnicity in 2011
Ethnicity	Number	Percentage
Serbs	771	53.9%
Montenegrins	495	34.6%
Croats	27	1.9%
other/undeclared	138	9.6%
Total	1,431	100%
