= Luštica, Herceg Novi =

Village in Herceg Novi, Montenegro

Luštica Луштица
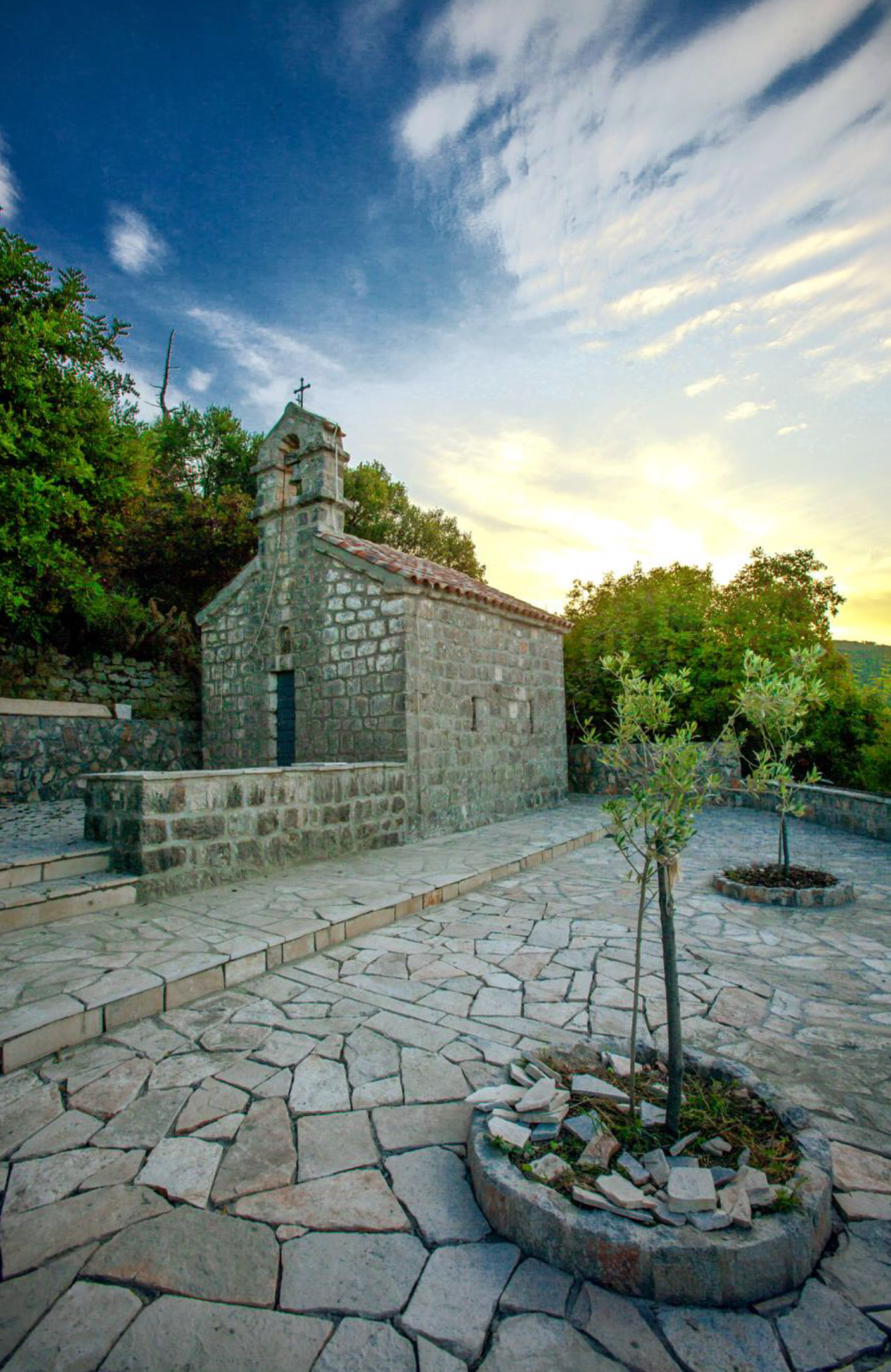
- Serbian Orthodox Church "St. Archangel Michael" in Klinci

- Location within Montenegro
- Coordinates: 42°23′48″N 18°36′7″E
- Country: Montenegro
- Region: Coastal
- Municipality: Herceg Novi

Population (2011)
  - Total: 311
- Time zone: UTC+1 (CET)
  - Summer (DST): UTC+2 (CEST)

Luštica (Serbian Cyrillic: Луштица) is a village in the municipality of Herceg Novi, Montenegro. It is located in the eponymous peninsula, on the shores of the Adriatic Sea. The settlement consists of hamlets of Rose, Klinci, Mrkovi, Zabrđe, Radovanovići, Brguli and Mardari.

== Demographics ==
According to 2003 census, it had a population of 338.

According to the 2011 census, its population was 311.

Ethnicity in 2011
Ethnicity	Number	Percentage
Serbs	159	51.1%
Montenegrins	90	28.9%
Russians	7	2.3%
other/undeclared	55	17.7%
Total	311	100%
