= Baošići =

Village in Herceg Novi, Montenegro

Baošići Баошићи Geto Baoše
- Village
- Location within Montenegro
- Coordinates: 42.442912°N 18.627013°E
- Country: Montenegro
- Region: Coastal
- Municipality: Herceg Novi

Population (2011)
  - Total: 1,346
- Time zone: UTC+1 (CET)
  - Summer (DST): UTC+2 (CEST)

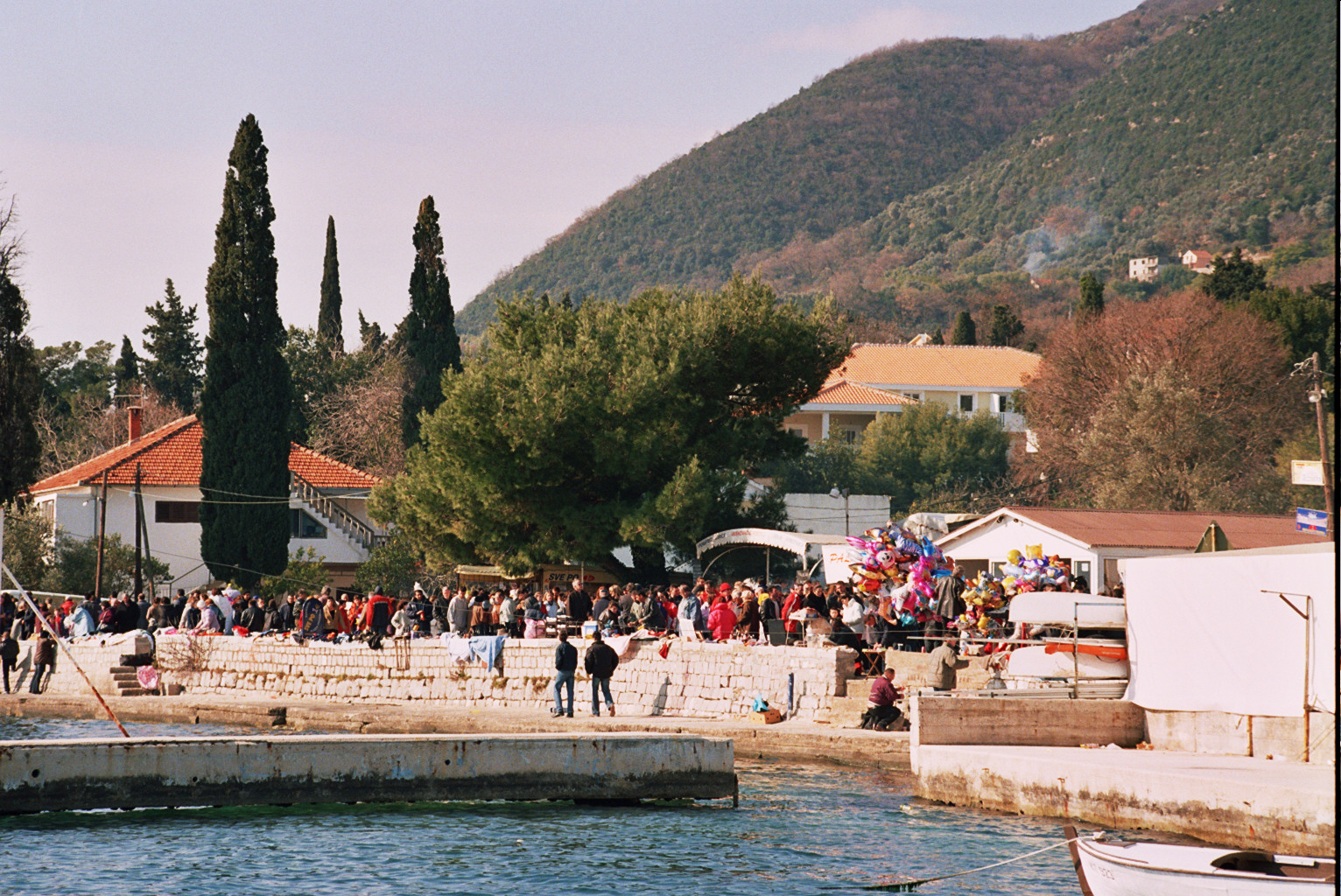

Baošići (Montenegrin: Баошићи, pronounced [bâoʃitɕi]) is a village in the municipality of Herceg Novi, Montenegro.

== Demographics ==
According to the 2011 census, its population was 1,346.

Ethnicity in 2011
Ethnicity	Number	Percentage
Serbs	697	51.8%
Montenegrins	462	34.3%
Croats	16	1.2%
Roma	9	0.7%
Bosniaks	6	0.4%
other/undeclared	156	11.6%
Total	1,346	100%
