= Sratsimir (village) =

- Village
- Location within Bulgaria
- Coordinates: 44.035484°N 27.349843°E
- Country: Bulgaria
- Province: Silistra Province
- Municipality: Silistra Municipality

Population (2011)
  - Total: 237

Sratsimir (Bulgarian: Срацимир) has been a settlement since 1830. Its population comes from the villages in Ludogorie after the signing of the Treaty of Adrianople (1829). The settlers were tricked by the Russian authorities into settling in Moldavia, but on the way they found that there were many free and rich lands with chernozem in the area. In addition, the 20-mile Silistra region is under occupation by the Russian Empire as a guarantee for the implementation of the peace treaty with the Ottoman Empire, and in particular for the payment of reparations.

Due to the fact that the emigrants were very awake, violent and rebellious, they settled and hid the village in the area of a wild forest, which is why the village was first called Ottoman-Turkish Kara Orman, which in English literally means Black Mountain.

Until 1836, the land of the village was under de facto Russian control from Silistra (since 1837 the Medjidi Tabia fortress was built), which is why the local Bulgarians decided that the forest surrounding the village would be the largest secret weapons depot for the prepared but thwarted an uprising called the Velcho's Conspiracy (1835). At the head of the conspiracy in the region is Georgi Mamarchev, a Bulgarian and Russian officer, as well as Georgi Rakovski's uncle.

From 1913 to 1940, the village was part of Durostor County in the Kingdom of Romania.
