= Glavan =

Glavan or Hlavan (Ukrainian: Главан) is a surname. Notable people include:

- Andrej Glavan (born 1943), Slovenian Roman Catholic prelate
- Damir Glavan (born 1974), Croatian water polo player
- Igor Glavan, alternative transliteration of Ihor Hlavan (born 1990), Ukrainian race walker
- Marcel Glăvan (born 1975), Romanian-Spanish canoeist
- Marina Glavan (born 1991), Croatian handball player
- Ruxanda Glavan (born 1980), Moldovan politician
