= Kazashko =

Kazashko Казашко
- Village
- Location in Bulgaria
- Coordinates: 43.198°N 27.823°E
- Country: Bulgaria
- Province: Varna Province
- Municipality: Varna Municipality
- Elevation: 1 m (3.3 ft)

Population (31 December 2013)
  - Total: 349
- Time zone: UTC+2:00 (EET)
  - Summer (DST): UTC+03:00 (EEST)
- Postal code: 9140

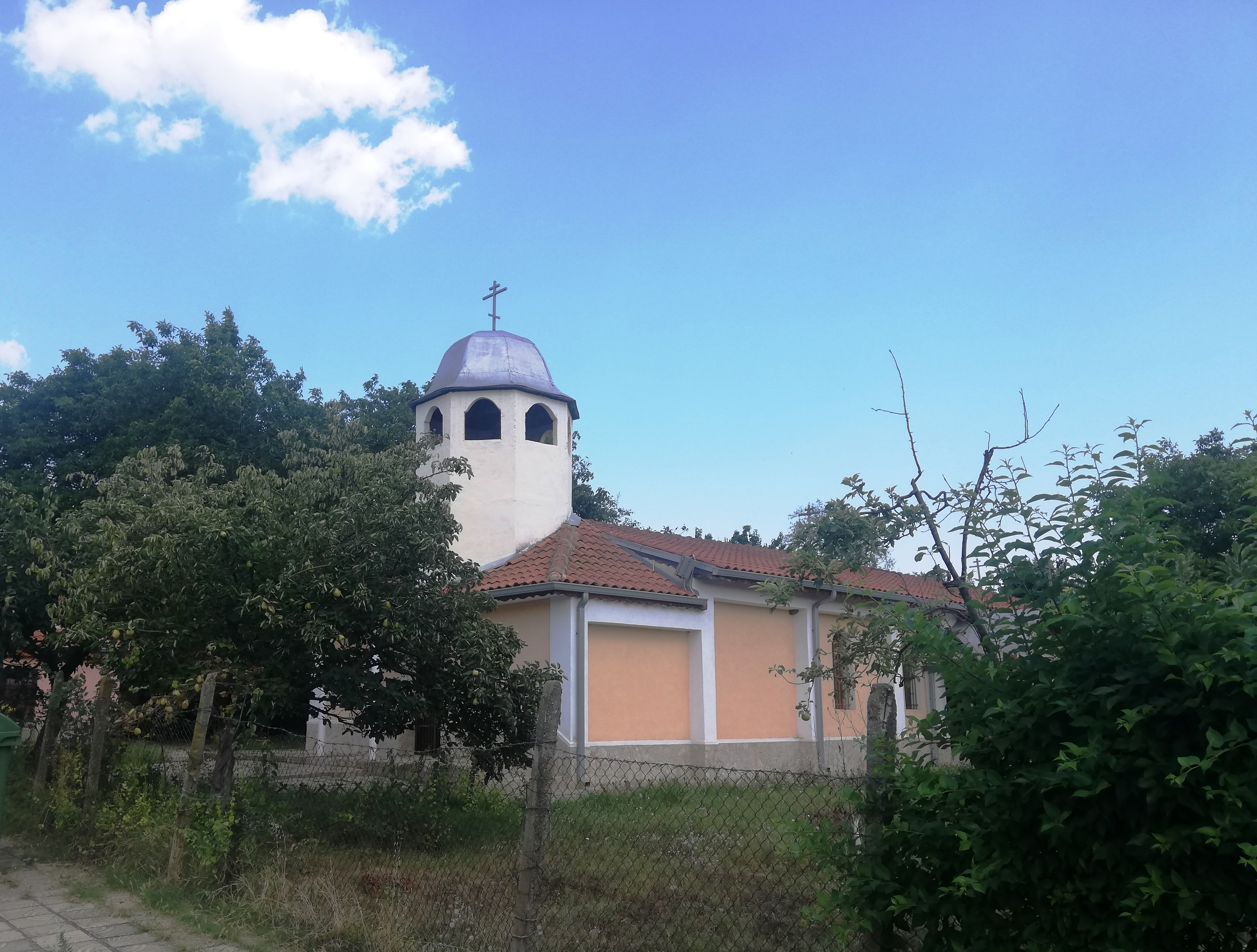
Russian Old-Orthodox Church In Kazashko, Varna Province

Kazashko (Bulgarian: Казашко) is a village in north-eastern Bulgaria. It is located in the municipality of Varna, Varna Province.

As of March 2015 the village has a population of 349. It is one of the only two Lipovan villages in Bulgaria, the other being Tataritsa.
