= Lipovans =

Russian Old Believer minority group located in Romania, Ukraine, Moldova and Bulgaria

липоване (Russian)
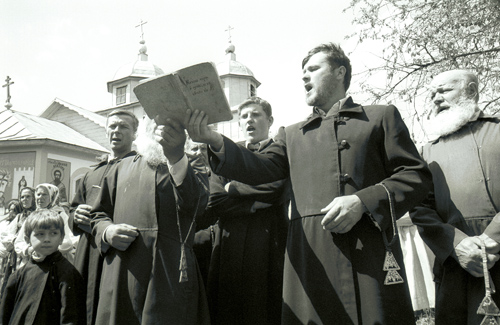
- Lipovans during a ceremony in front of the Lipovan church in the Romanian village of Slava Cercheză in 2004

Regions with significant populations
- Romania: 23,487
- Bulgaria: 700–800

Languages
- Russian, Romanian, Ukrainian, Bulgarian

Religion
- Old Believers (Eastern Orthodox Christianity)

Related ethnic groups
- Russians

The Lipovans or Lippovans (Note: Russian: липоване, romanized: lipovane; Romanian: lipoveni; Ukrainian: липовани, romanized: lypovany; Bulgarian: липованци, romanized: lipovantsi.) are ethnic Russian Old Believers living in Romania, Ukraine, Moldova and Bulgaria who settled in the Principality of Moldavia, in the east of the Principality of Wallachia (Muntenia), and in the regions of Dobruja and Budjak during the 17th and 18th centuries. According to the 2011 Romanian census, there are a total of 23,487 Lipovans in Romania, mostly living in Northern Dobruja, in Tulcea County but also in Constanța County, and in the cities of Iași, Brăila and Bucharest. In Bulgaria, they inhabit two villages: Kazashko and Tataritsa.

== Name ==
The origin of the name of the Lipovans is not known exactly, but it may come from the linden trees ("lipa" or липа in Russian) of the area they populate bordering the Wild Fields. Linguist Victor Vascenco considers this to be folk etymology. Another hypothesis claims the name derives from the name "Filipp" (1672-1742) which is alleged to have been the true name of the son of Nikita Pustosvyat (d.1683) who according to a legend led the group of dissenters who emigrated to what is now Romania, his adepts being named filippovtsy which became lipovtsi and finally lipovane. Another hypothesis derives it from "Filippovka", a holiday name dedicated to Saint Philip of Moscow.

== History ==
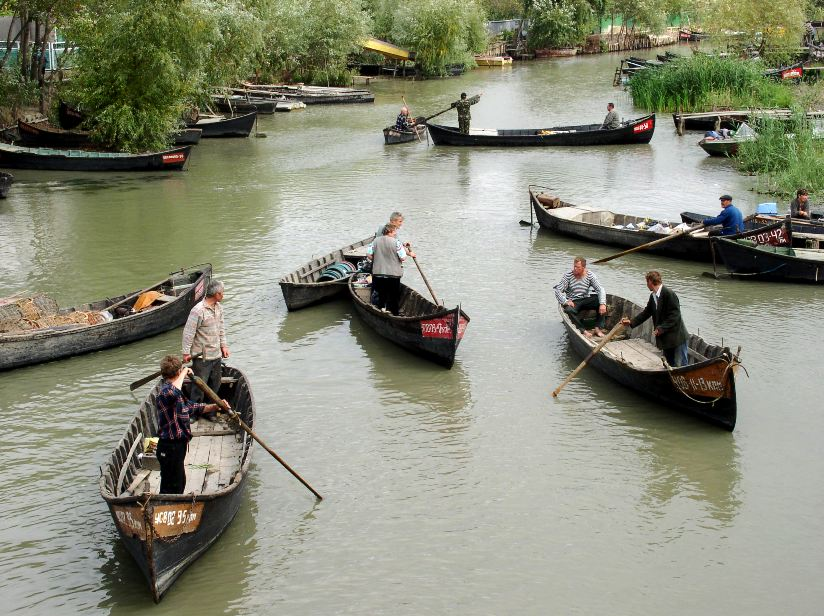
Lipovans in Vylkove, Ukraine

The Lipovans emigrated from Russia in the 18th century, as dissenters from the main Russian Orthodox Church. They settled along the Prut River in Moldavia and in the Danube Delta. They have maintained strong religious traditions which predate the reforms of the Russian Orthodox Church undertaken during the rule of Patriarch Nikon. When the Patriarch made changes to worship in 1652, some believers carried on worshipping in the "old way". In that sense, they continued to speak Old Russian, to cross themselves with two fingers instead of three, and to keep their beards. The Russian government and the Orthodox Church persecuted them, and as a result various sects arose whose goal was to commit suicide, e.g., by burning themselves (self-burners: сожигатели, sozhigateli), with many others being forced to emigrate.

Lipovans are considered to be schismatic by the Russian Orthodox Church, not being part of the broad canonical orthodox communion, although relations have improved recently. (See main article on Old Believers.)

== Population ==
The main centre of the Lipovan community in Ukraine is the town of Vylkove, which has its own church, the St Nicholas Church. In order to construct their homes, the Lipovans create islets of dry land by digging mud out from trenches and making a series of canals. The house walls are made of reed and mud, and thatching is standard for the roofing.

== See also ==
- Community of the Lipovan Russians in Romania
- Lipovan Orthodox Old-Rite Church
