= Herceg Novi Municipality =

Herceg Novi Municipality Opština Herceg Novi Општина Херцег Нови
- Municipality
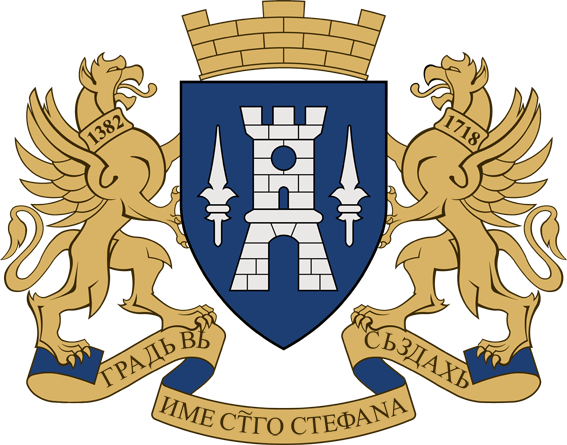
- Flag Coat of arms

- Herceg Novi Municipality in Montenegro
- Country: Montenegro
- Seat: Herceg Novi

Area
  - Total: 235 km^{2} (91 sq mi)

Population (2011)
  - Total: 30,864
  - Density: 131/km^{2} (340/sq mi)
- Postal code: 85340
- Area code: +382 31
- ISO 3166-2 code: ME-08
- Car plates: HN
- Website: hercegnovi.me

Herceg Novi Municipality (Montenegrin: Opština Herceg Novi, Општина Херцег Нови) is one of the municipalities in southwestern Montenegro. The administrative center is Herceg Novi.

== Location and tourism ==
The Herceg Novi municipality stretches from Prevlaka to the Verige bridge. An almost unbroken string of towns lie along this strip of coast, including Prevlaka, Igalo, Herceg Novi, Baošići, Đenovići, Meljine, Zelenika, Sutorina, and Bijela. The municipality is located at the Adriatic coast in southwestern Montenegro, at the entrance to the Bay of Kotor and at the foot of Mount Orjen. Herceg Novi is one of the major tourist destinations in Montenegro. It is well known as a spa and health center; nearby Igalo has an abundance of healing sea mud called "igaljsko blato" (Igalo mud) and mineral springs called "igaljske slatine" (Igalo springs). The most famous tourist attractions in Herceg Novi are the Forte Mare Castle built in 1382, a clock tower built by the Austrians in the 19th century, the Kanli tower built by the Turks, and the Serbian Orthodox Church of St. Michael Archangel in the central Belavista Square. Whilst the city itself is not a major destination for sunbathing, with no long sandy beaches along the rest of the Bay of Kotor, many beaches are reachable by boat. Popular Luštica peninsula beach sites include Žanjic, Mirište and Rose.

== Administration ==
=== Local communities ===
The municipality consists of the following local communities (mjesne zajednice):

- Igalo
- Topla
- Herceg Novi
- Meljine
- Zelenika - Kuti
- Kumbor
- Đenović
- Baošić
- Bijela
- Kamenari
- Podi
- Srbina
- Prijevor
- Sutorina
- Kruševice
- Kameno - Žlijebi
- Mokrine
- Luštica
- Sušćepan - Ratiševina - Trebesin
- Mojdež
- Ubli

=== City Assembly (2025–2029) ===
The municipal parliament consists of 35 deputies elected directly for a four-year term.

Party / Coalition	Seats	Local government
DCG	12 / 35	Government
NL	10 / 35	Government
DPS	5 / 35	Opposition
ZBCG (NSD–DNP)	5 / 35	Government
URA	1 / 35	Opposition
GPZHN	1 / 35	Opposition
SD	1 / 35	Opposition

== Demographics ==
Historical population
Year	Pop.	±% p.a.
1948	12,482	—
1953	13,759	+1.97%
1961	15,157	+1.22%
1971	18,368	+1.94%
1981	23,258	+2.39%
1991	27,593	+1.72%
2003	33,034	+1.51%
2011	30,864	−0.85%
2023	30,824	−0.01%

The town of Herceg Novi is the administrative centre of the municipality. The municipality also includes the neighbouring towns of Igalo, Zelenika and Bijela, and has a population of 19,218 (2011 census). The town of Herceg Novi itself has 13,338 inhabitants. On the census 2023 the municipality had 30,824 inhabitants.

List of cities by population
Ethnicity	2023	2011	2003
Albanians	63(0.20%)	41(0.13%)	25(0.08%)
Croat	511(1.66%)	662(2.15%)	798(2.42%)
Montenegrins	9,175(29.77%)	10,395(33.68%)	9,447(28.80%)
Muslims	86(0.28%)	283(0.92%)	299(0.91%)
Serbs	14,901(48.34%)	15,260(48.89%)	17,470(52.89%)
Yugoslavs	215(0.70%)	157(0.51%)	270(0.82%)
Undeclared	1,996(6.48%)	2,908(9.42%)	2,746(8.31%)
Others	3,877(12.57%)	1,158(3.75%)	1,979(5.99%)
Total	30,824	30,864	33,034

Herceg Novi(2023)
Eastern Orthodox	83.67%
Roman Catholic	3.52%
Islam	2.33%
Atheist	3.82%
Others	6.66%

== Gallery ==
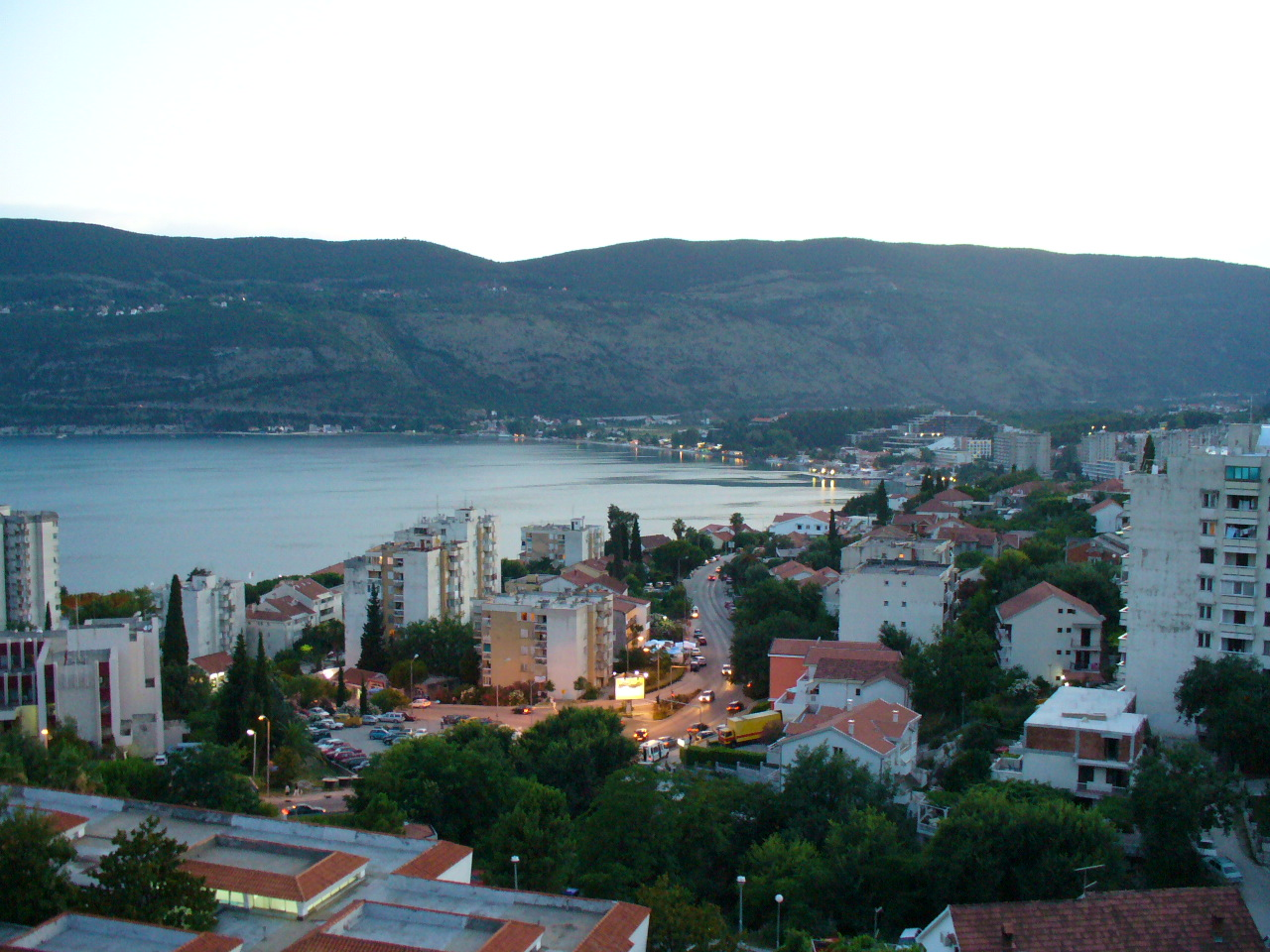
Town of Herceg Novi

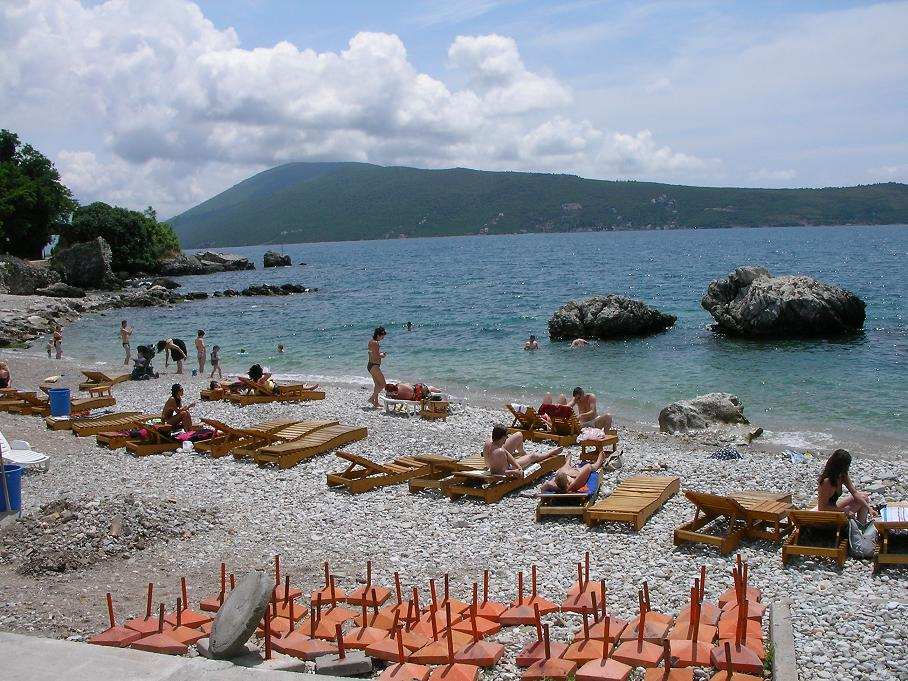
Beach in Herceg Novi

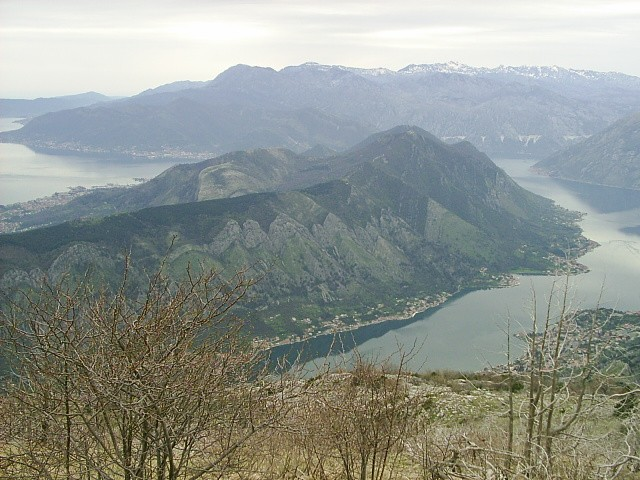
Luštica

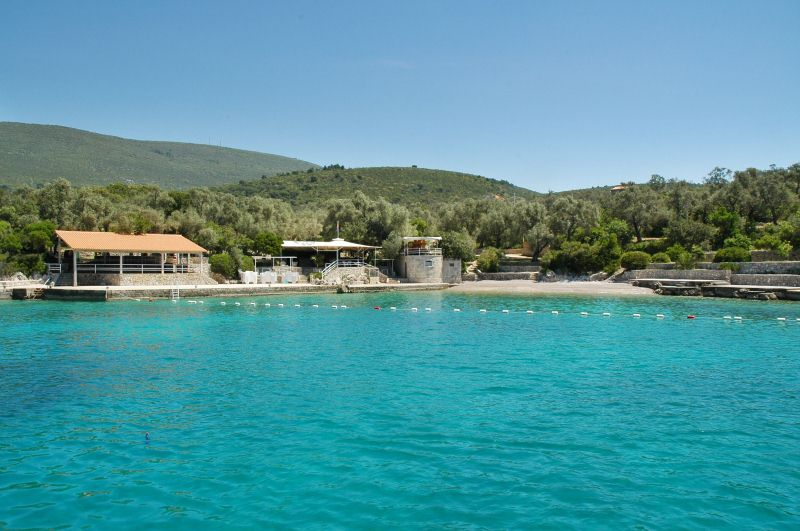
Miriste beach, Luštica

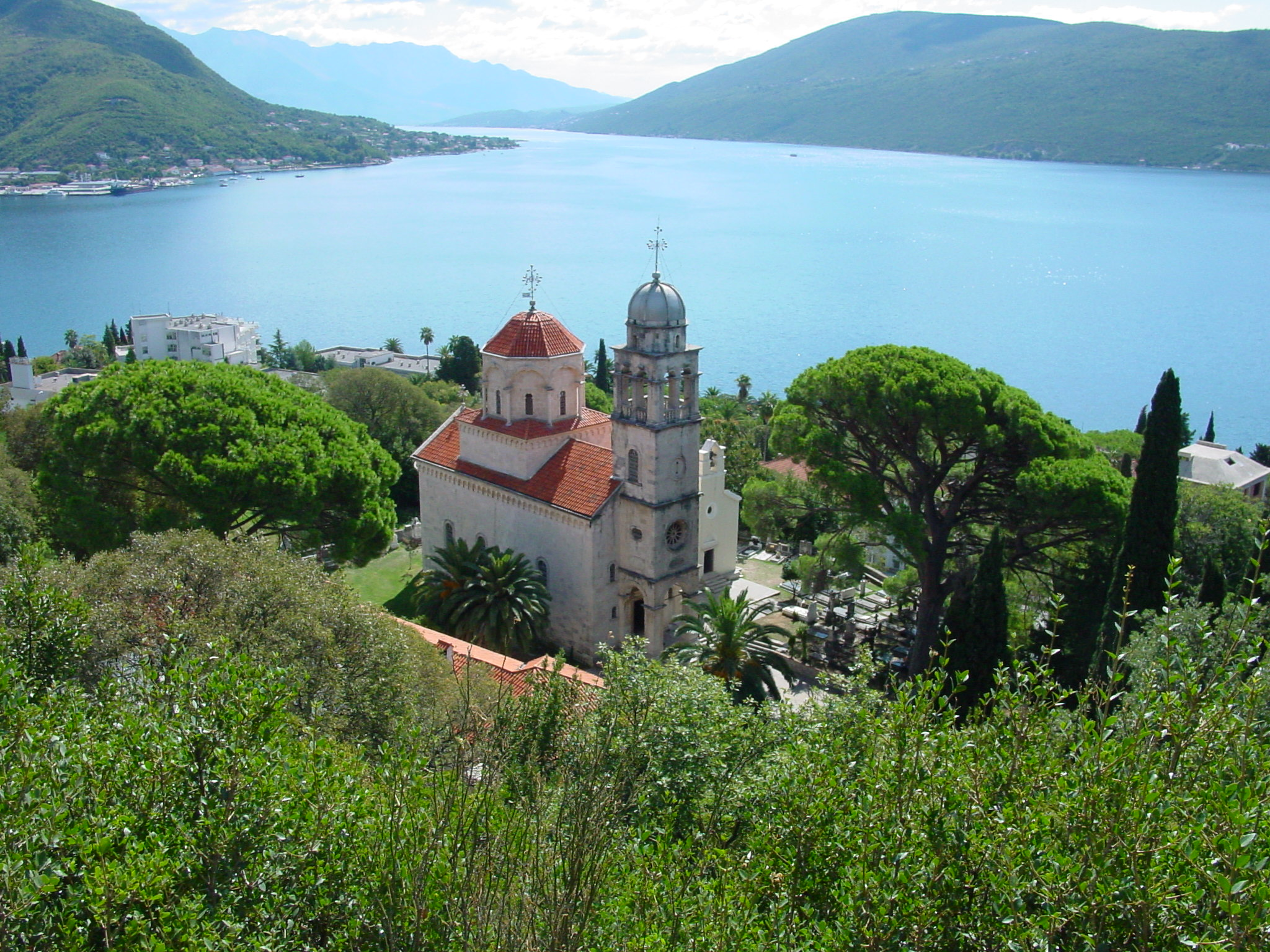
Savina Monastery

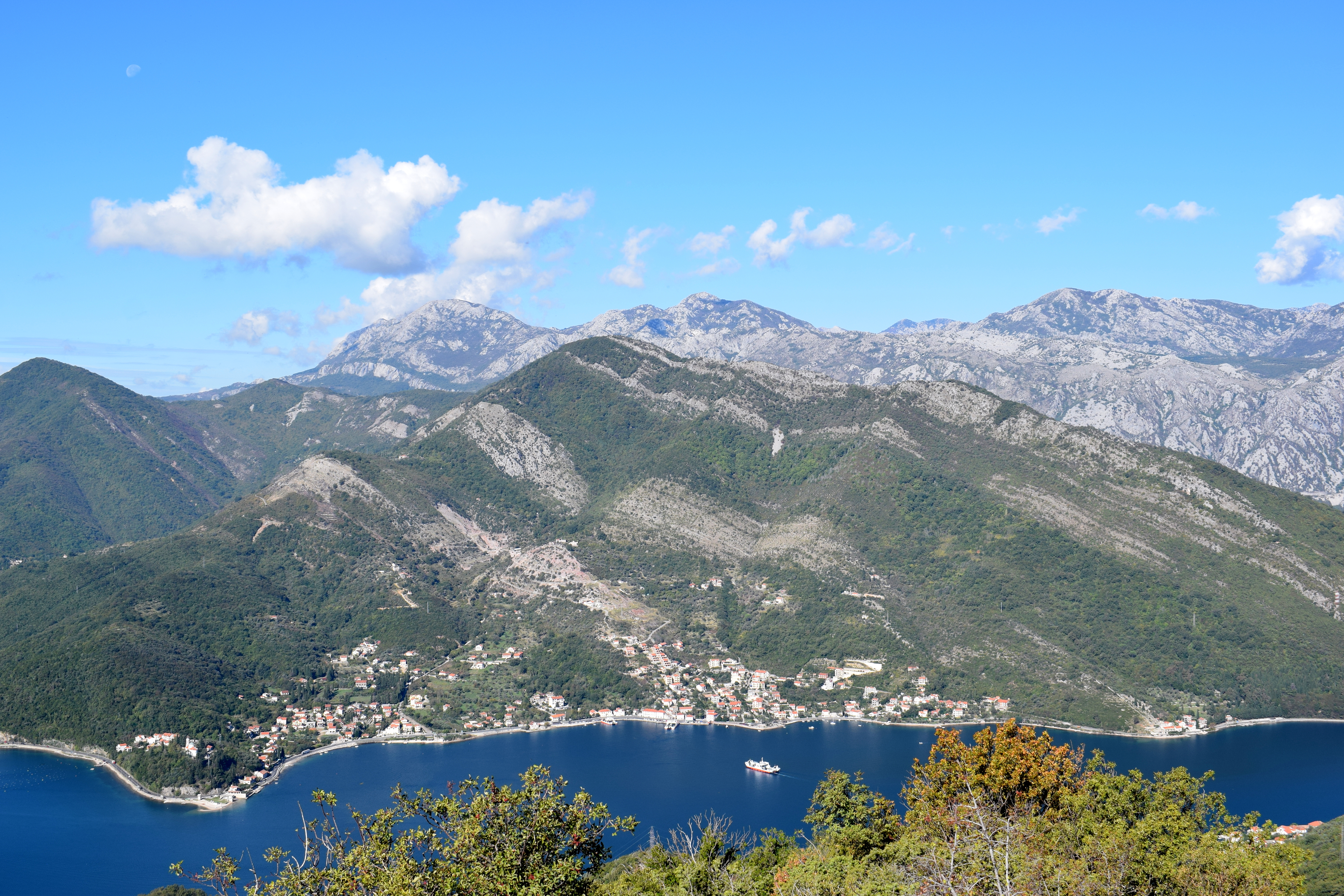
Town of Kamenari

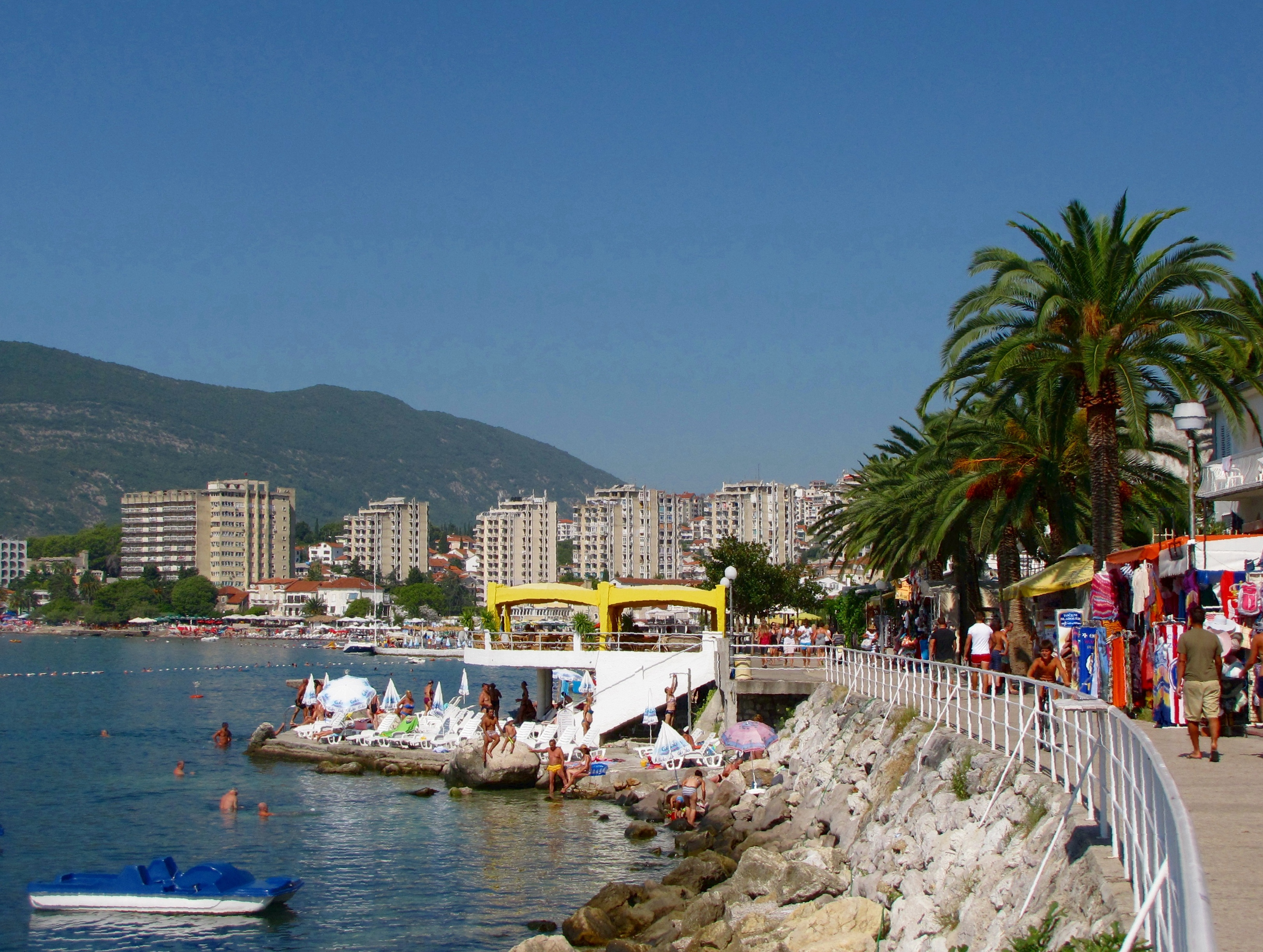
Town of Igalo

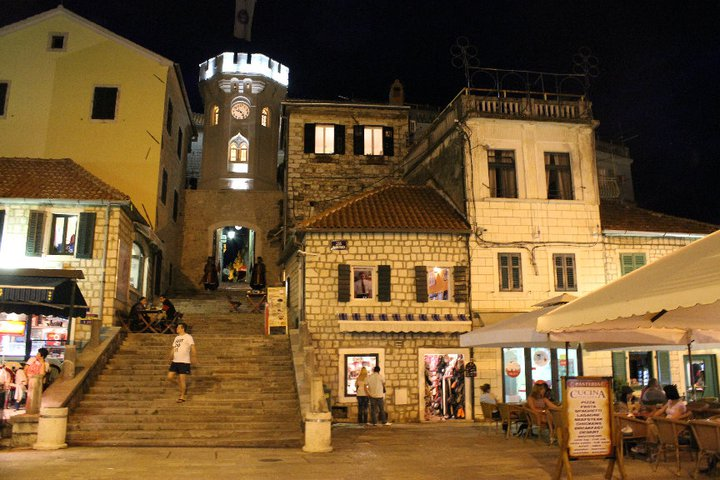
Herceg Novi Tower
