= Ratiševina =

Village in Herceg Novi, Montenegro

Ratiševina Ратишевина
- Village
- Location within Montenegro
- Coordinates: 42.478253°N 18.501787°E
- Country: Montenegro
- Region: Coastal
- Municipality: Herceg Novi

Population (2011)
  - Total: 130
- Time zone: UTC+1 (CET)
  - Summer (DST): UTC+2 (CEST)

Ratiševina (Montenegrin: Ратишевина) is a village in the municipality of Herceg Novi, Montenegro.

== Demographics ==
According to the 2011 census, its population was 130.

Ethnicity in 2011
Ethnicity	Number	Percentage
Serbs	76	58.5%
Montenegrins	33	25.4%
other/undeclared	21	16.2%
Total	130	100%
