= Sušćepan =

Village in Herceg Novi, Montenegro

Sušćepan Сушћепан
- Village
- Location within Montenegro
- Coordinates: 42.466753°N 18.509672°E
- Country: Montenegro
- Region: Coastal
- Municipality: Herceg Novi

Population (2011)
  - Total: 544
- Time zone: UTC+1 (CET)
  - Summer (DST): UTC+2 (CEST)

Sušćepan (Montenegrin: Сушћепан) is a village in the municipality of Herceg Novi, Montenegro.

== Demographics ==
According to the 2011 census, its population was 544.

Ethnicity in 2011
Ethnicity	Number	Percentage
Serbs	266	48.9%
Montenegrins	129	23.7%
Roma	33	6.1%
Croats	14	2.6%
Russians	13	2.4%
other/undeclared	89	16.4%
Total	544	100%
