= Prijevor, Herceg Novi =

Village in Herceg Novi, Montenegro

Prijevor Пријевор
- Village
- Location within Montenegro
- Coordinates: 42.489666°N 18.451833°E
- Country: Montenegro
- Region: Coastal
- Municipality: Herceg Novi

Population (2011)
  - Total: 104
- Time zone: UTC+1 (CET)
  - Summer (DST): UTC+2 (CEST)

Prijevor (Montenegrin: Пријевор) is a village in the municipality of Herceg Novi, Montenegro. It is located close to the Croatian border.

== Demographics ==
According to the 2011 census, its population was 104.

Ethnicity in 2011
Ethnicity	Number	Percentage
Serbs	86	82.7%
Montenegrins	12	11.5%
other/undeclared	6	5.8%
Total	104	100%
