= Kruševice, Herceg Novi =

Village in Herceg Novi, Montenegro

Kruševice Крушевице
- Village
- Location within Montenegro
- Coordinates: 42.534607°N 18.494427°E
- Country: Montenegro
- Region: Coastal
- Municipality: Herceg Novi

Population (2011)
  - Total: 240
- Time zone: UTC+1 (CET)
  - Summer (DST): UTC+2 (CEST)

Kruševice (Montenegrin: Крушевице) is a village in the municipality of Herceg Novi, Montenegro.

== Demographics ==
According to the 2011 census, its population was 240.

Ethnicity in 2011
Ethnicity	Number	Percentage
Serbs	151	62.9%
Montenegrins	62	25.8%
other/undeclared	27	11.3%
Total	240	100%
