= Igalo =

Town in Herceg Novi, Montenegro

Igalo Игало
- Town
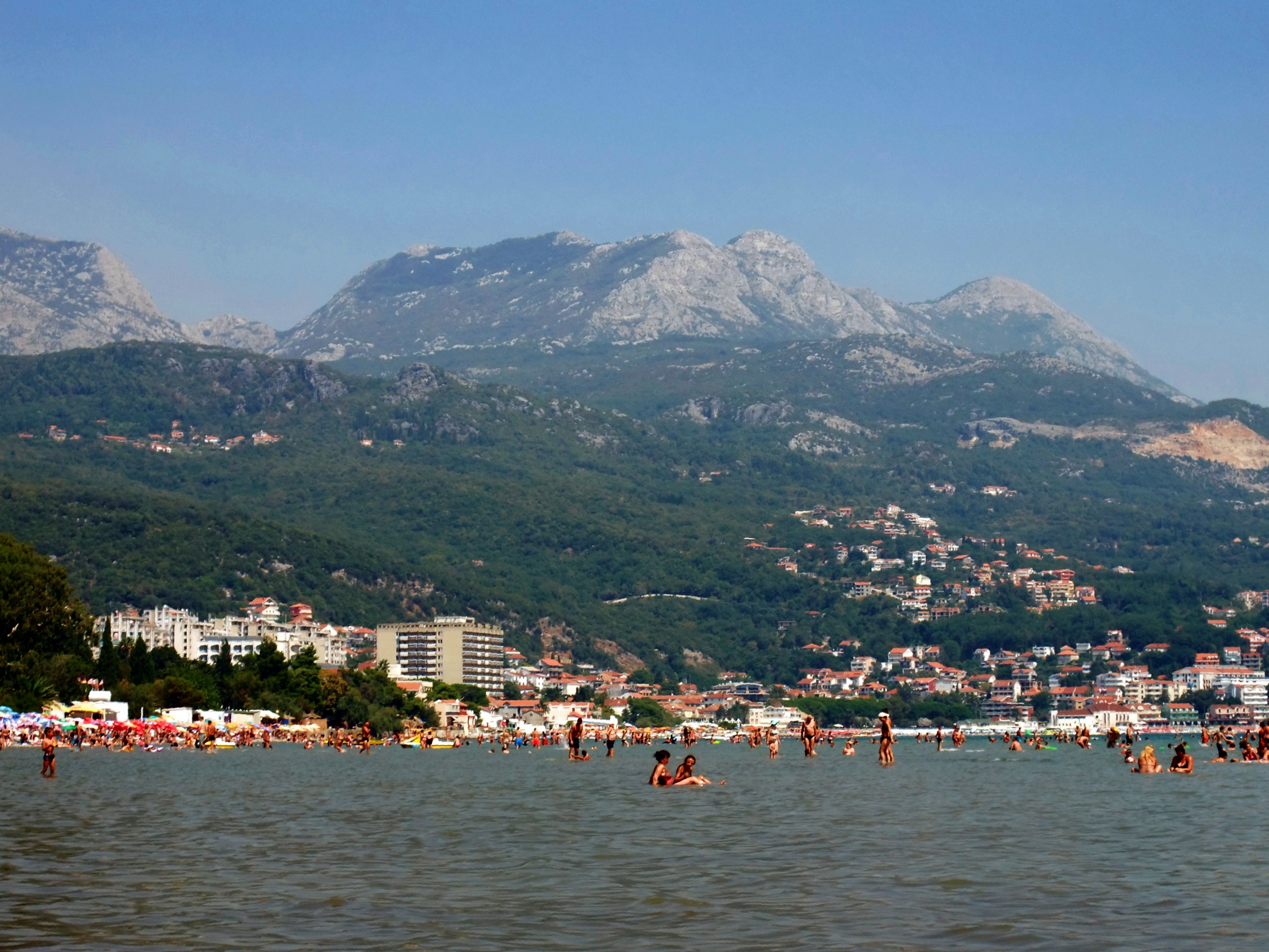
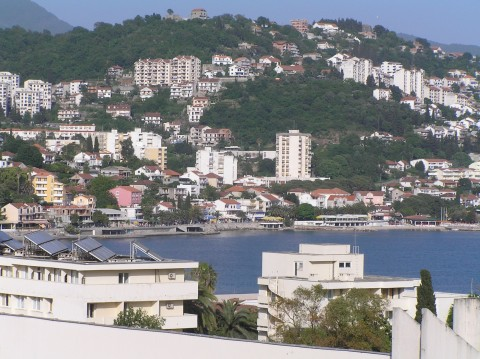
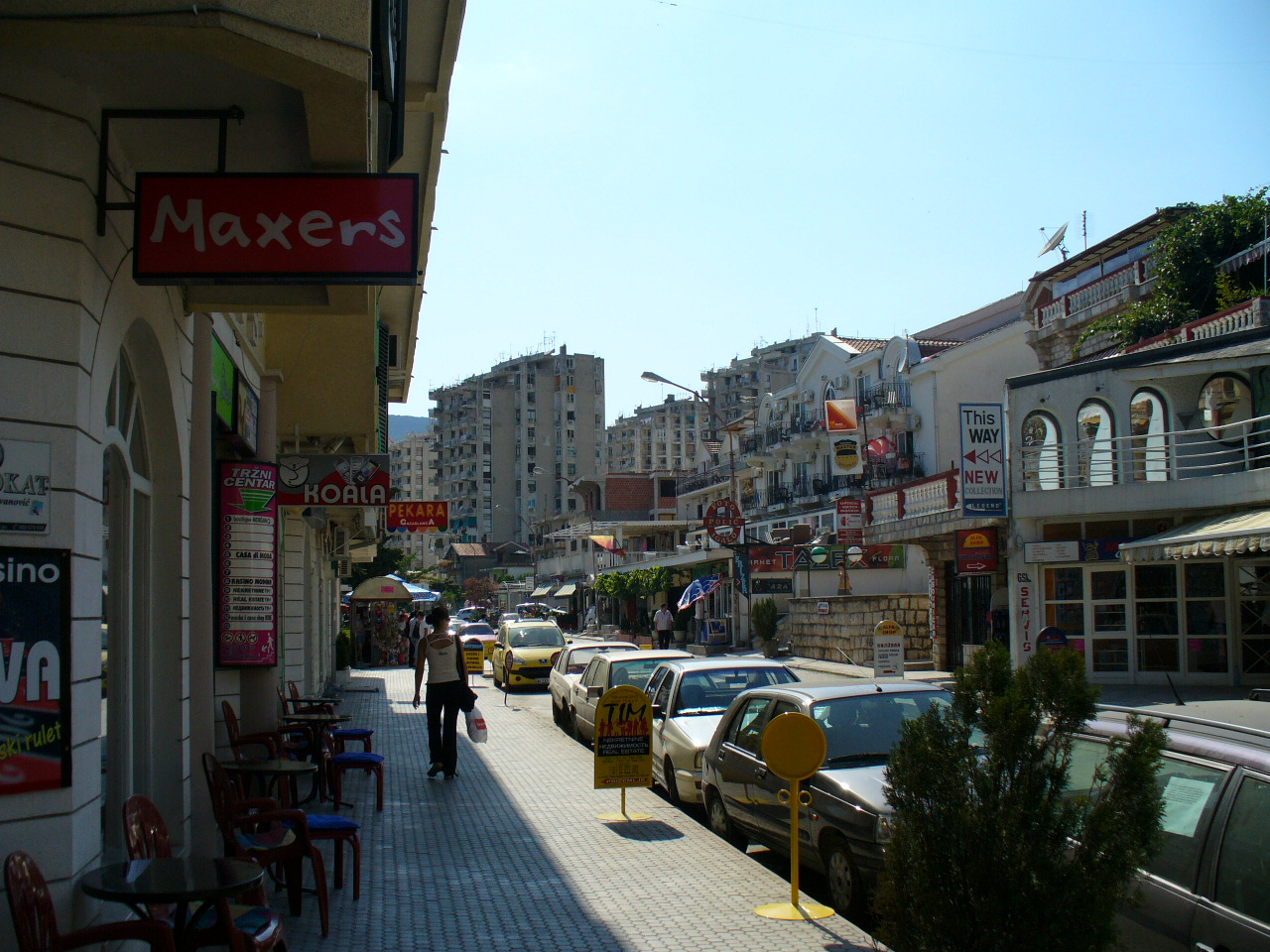
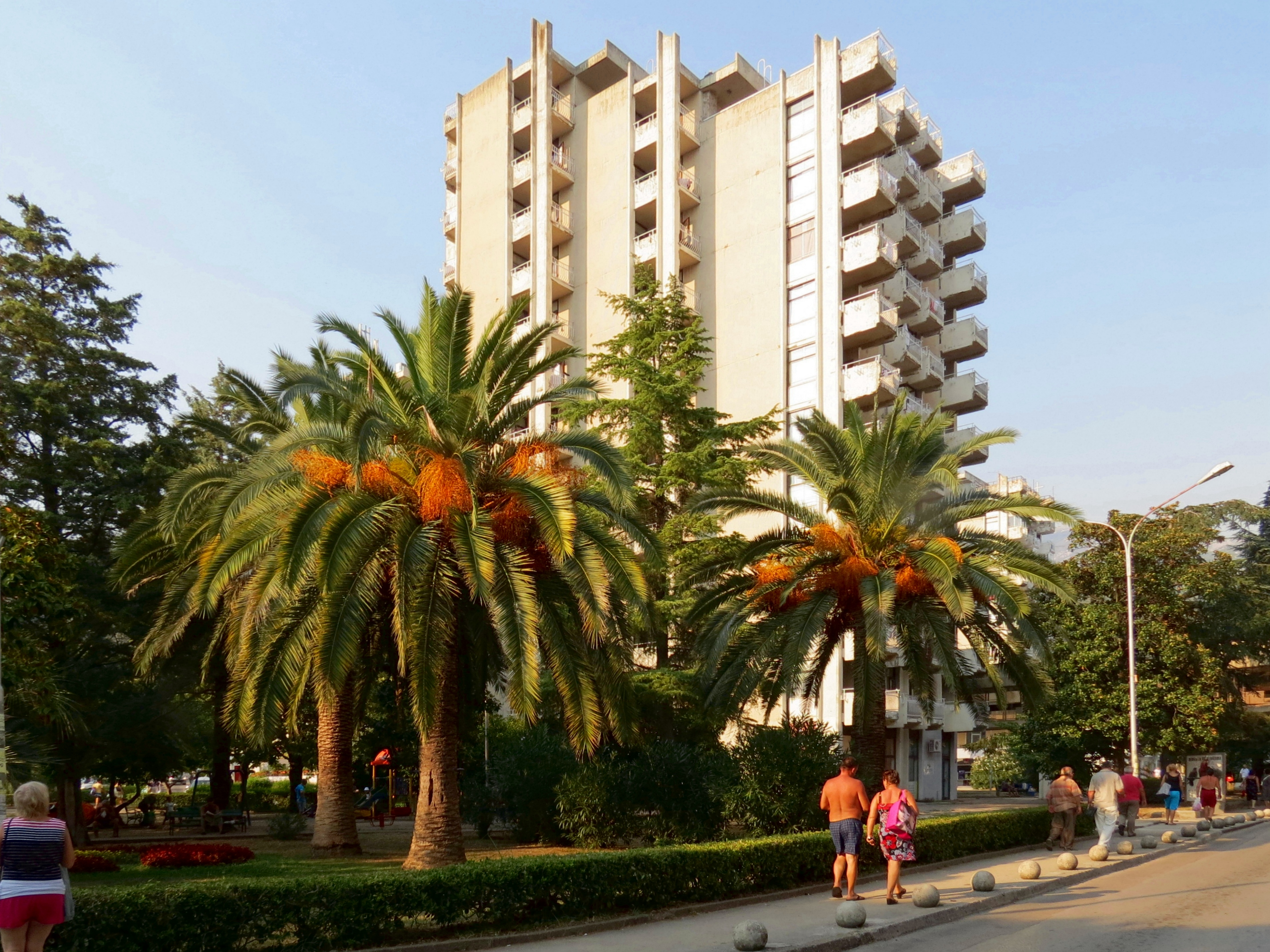
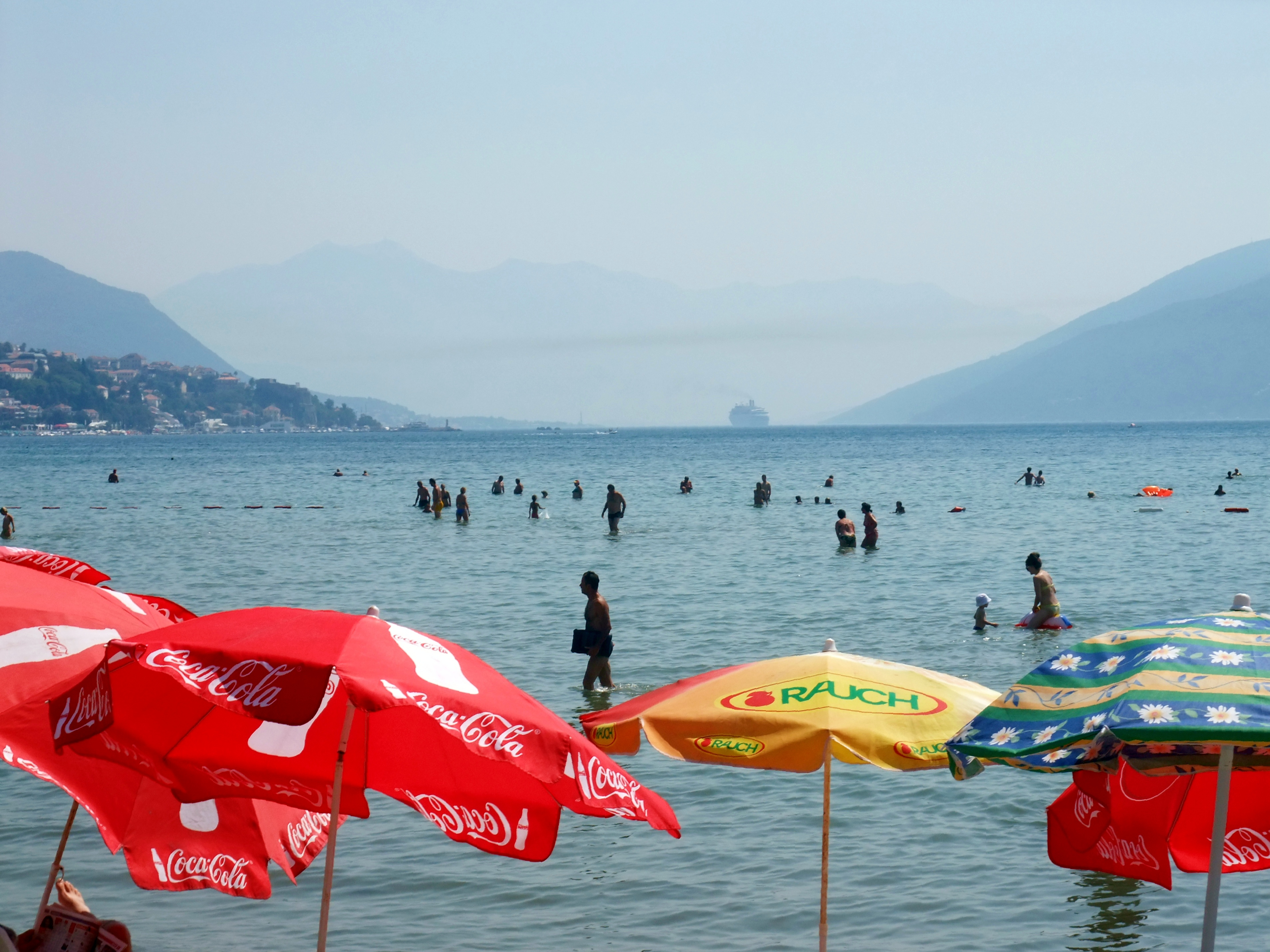
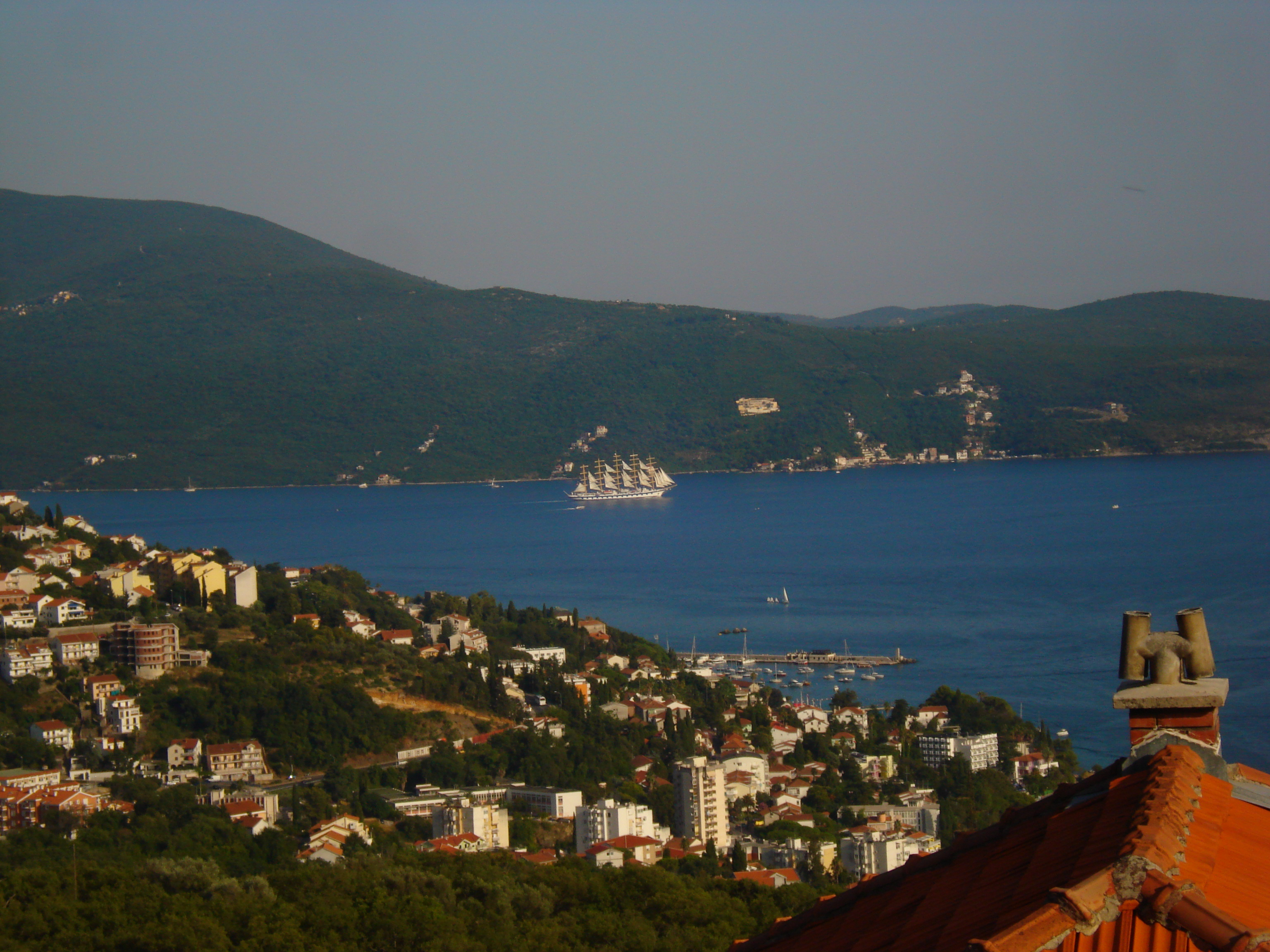
- Interactive map of Igalo
- Location within Montenegro
- Coordinates: 42°27′32″N 18°30′44″E
- Country: Montenegro
- Region: Coastal
- Municipality: Herceg Novi

Population (2011)
  - Total: 3,355
- Time zone: UTC+1 (CET)
  - Summer (DST): UTC+2 (CEST)
- Postal code: 85347

Igalo (Montenegrin: Игало, Serbian: Игало) is a small town in the Herceg Novi Municipality of Montenegro. It is accessible via the E65/E80 north headed to Dubrovnik, Croatia. According to the 2011 Census, it has a population of 3,355. The town adjoins Herceg Novi and is administratively divided leaving no clear division between the towns.

== Overview ==
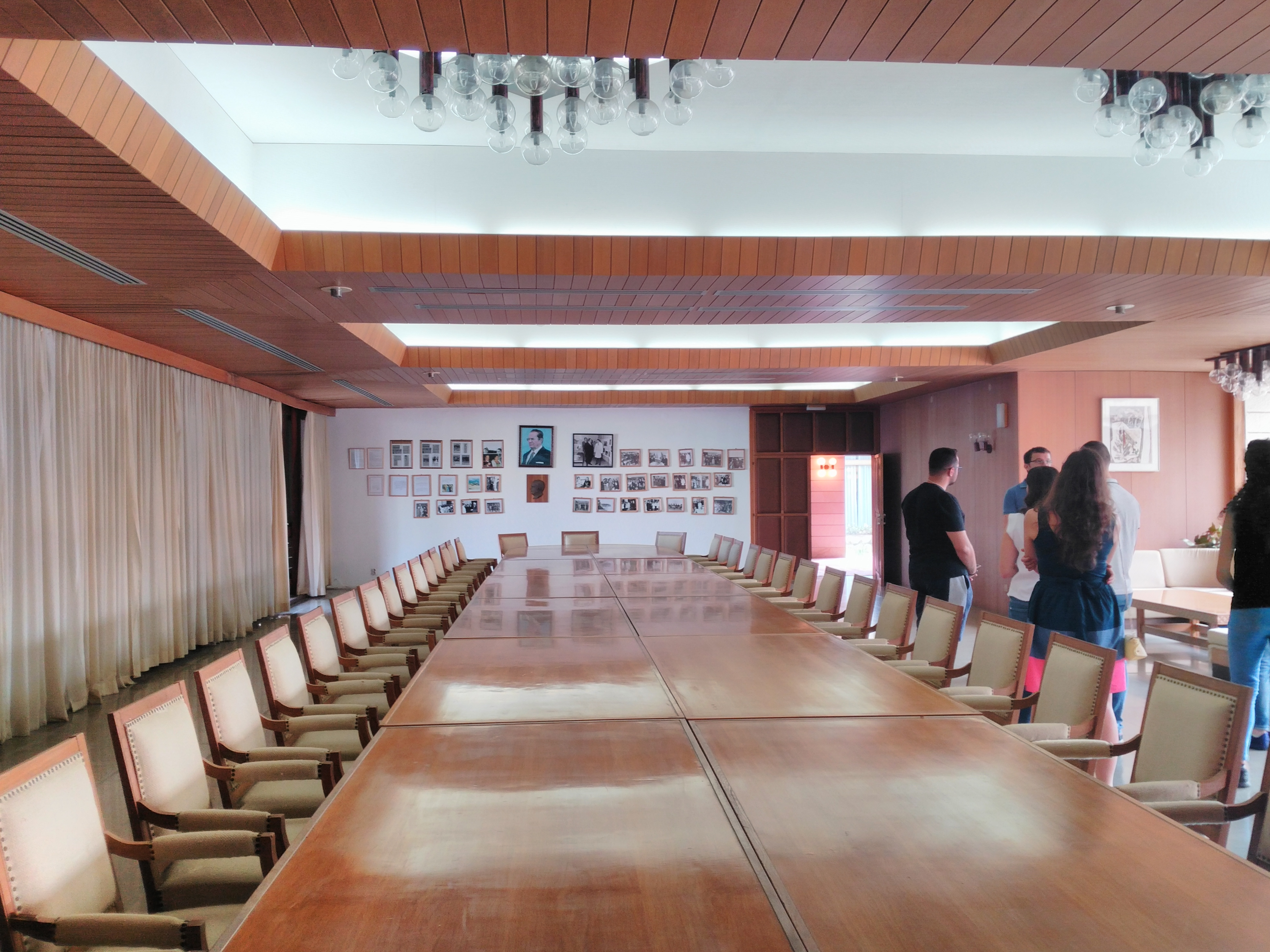
Villa Galeb Interior (summer 2018).

Located on the slopes of Mount Orjen, Igalo is regionally famous for the "DR Simo Milošević" Institute, a Mediterranean themed health spa which formerly attracted many tourists. Architect Aleksandar Đorđevic built this Institute. The institute is one of the unique hospitals and spas in the Balkans. Though the effects of the Yugoslav Wars limited Igalo's attractiveness as a tourist destination, it nonetheless remains a popular resort for tourists from the surrounding region.

Former Yugoslav leader Tito had his summer villa in this town. This villa was subsequently used to host the last meeting between Slobodan Milošević (then President of Serbia) and Franjo Tuđman (then President of Croatia) amid the early stages of the Yugoslav Wars and fighting between Serbs and Croats throughout Croatia.

== Demographics ==
According to the 2011 census, its population was 3,355.

Ethnicity in 2011
Ethnicity	Number	Percentage
Serbs	1,804	53.8%
Montenegrins	1,016	30.3%
Croats	61	1.8%
Roma	29	0.9%
Macedonians	15	0.4%
other/undeclared	430	12.8%
Total	3,355	100%

== Sports ==
The local football team, FK Igalo 1929, plays in the country's second tier. They host their home matches at the Stadion Solila.
