= Fort Prevlaka =

- Utvrda na Prevlaci
- Prevlaka, Croatia
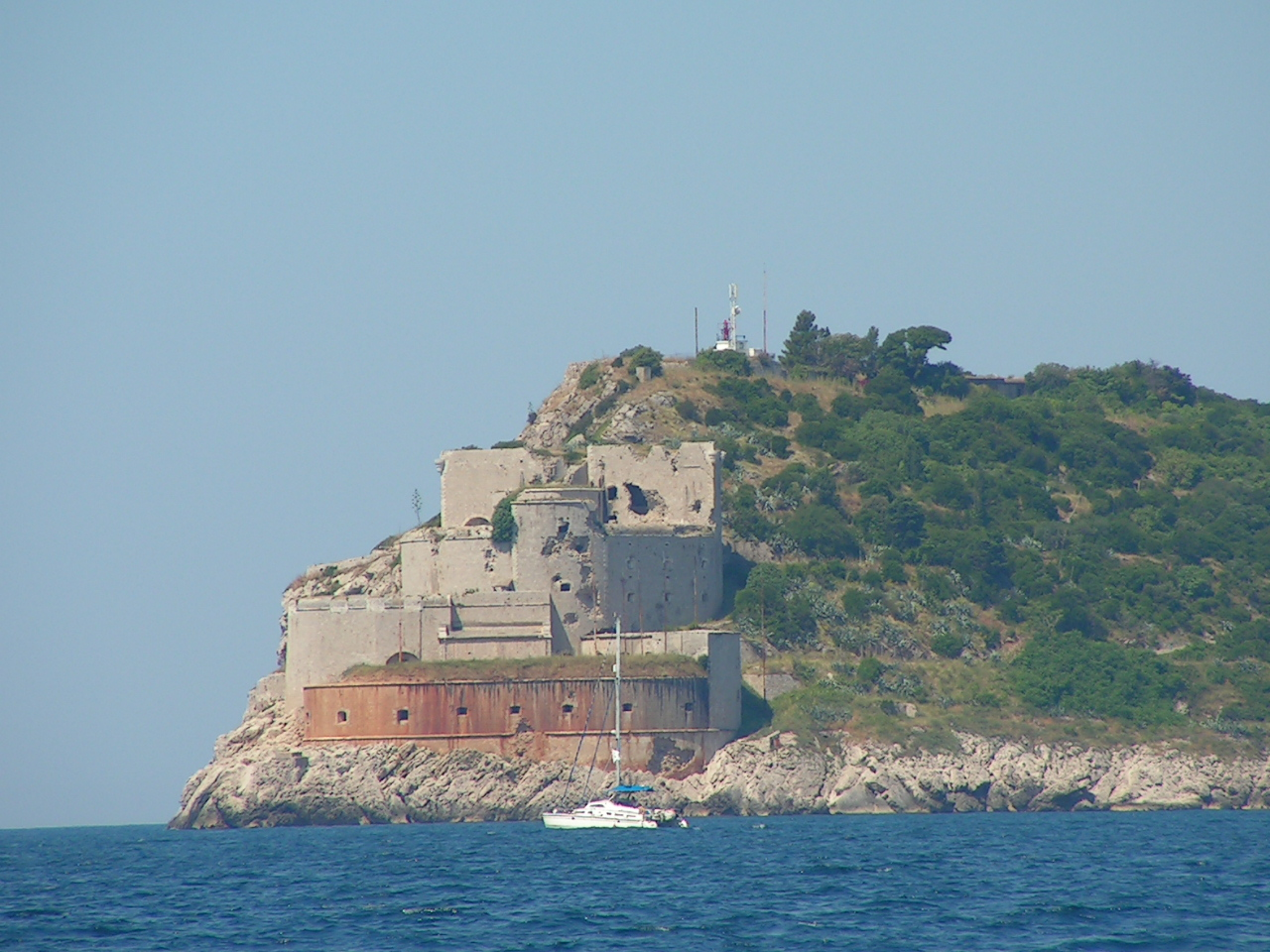
- The fort in 2006

Site information
- Type: Coastal fort
- Condition: Damaged; under restoration

Location
- Coordinates: 42°23′34.1″N 18°31′58.5″E

Site history
- Built: mid-19th century
- Built by: Austrian Empire
- Materials: stone

Cultural Good of Croatia
- Official name: Utvrda na Prevlaci
- Type: Protected cultural good
- Reference no.: Z-7183

Fort Prevlaka (Croatian: Utvrda na Prevlaci), also known as Fort Cape Oštro, is a mid-19th-century coastal fort at Cape Oštro, at the tip of the Prevlaka peninsula, in the Konavle municipality of Dubrovnik-Neretva County, Croatia. It stands at the southernmost point of mainland Croatia, at the entrance to the Bay of Kotor, near the border with Montenegro. Built to control the entrance to the bay, together with the Fortress Mamula and Fort Arza it formed the first line of the southern defensive zone of the Bay of Kotor. It is protected as a cultural good of the Republic of Croatia.

== History ==
The fort was built by the Austrian Empire in the mid-19th century to control the entrance to the Bay of Kotor and prevent the passage of enemy ships. Together with the fortifications on the island of Mamula and at Cape Arza, all built at the suggestion of the Austrian general Lazar Mamula, it formed the first line of the southern defensive zone of the Boka fortress system.

The fort was damaged after the capitulation of Italy in 1943, and in the second half of the 20th century it served as a base of the Yugoslav People's Army. Following the breakup of Yugoslavia, the Prevlaka peninsula on which the fort stands became the subject of a territorial dispute and was placed under United Nations monitoring until 2002, when administration was returned to Croatia.

== Description ==
The fort stands at Cape Oštro, at the very end of the Prevlaka peninsula, reached by a road running the length of the peninsula. It follows the slope of the terrain and is organised on five levels of oval plan. The lower levels contain semicircular crew quarters, shelters and storerooms, characterised by thick walls and vaults, paved with stone slabs and brick, while the ceilings of the upper parts are reinforced with iron beams. On the second and third levels are two spacious terraces with a water cistern finished with finely shaped stone rims. The paving is of reddish stone slabs from the Kamenari quarry, laid in a regular pattern with pronounced edge and diagonal bands. The dominant multi-storey part of the fort occupies the highest level and terminates in profiled stone corbels that probably supported a parapet, preserved only in traces. The fort is built of finely dressed ashlar stone, with various types of openings.

== Gallery ==
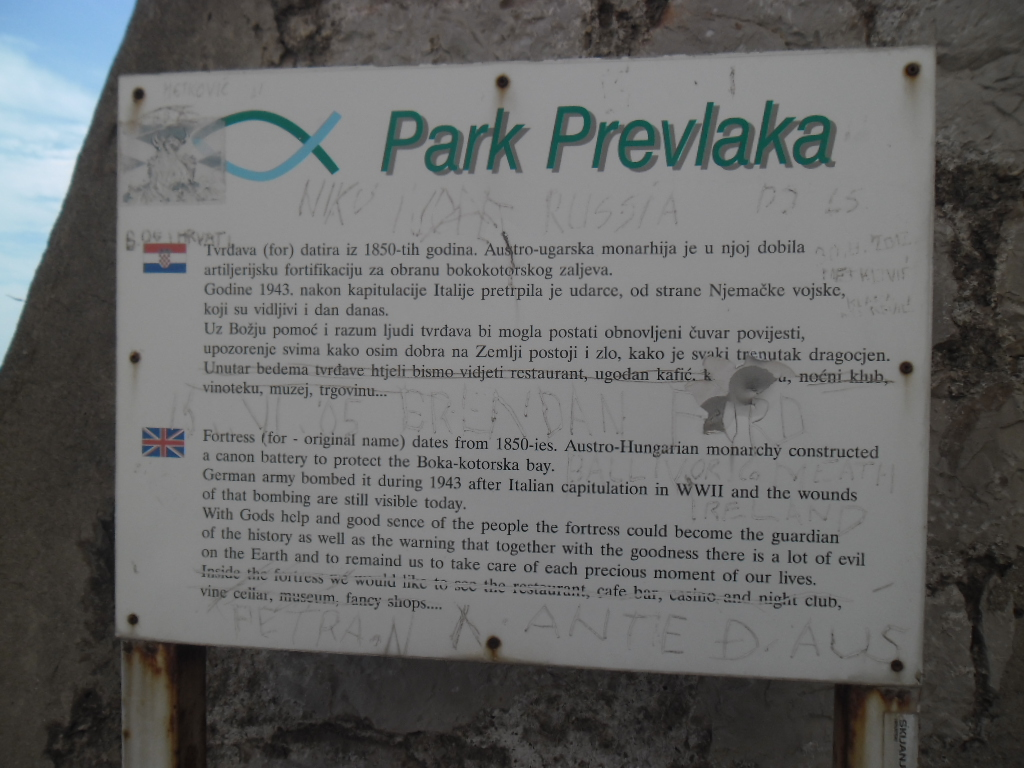
Information board

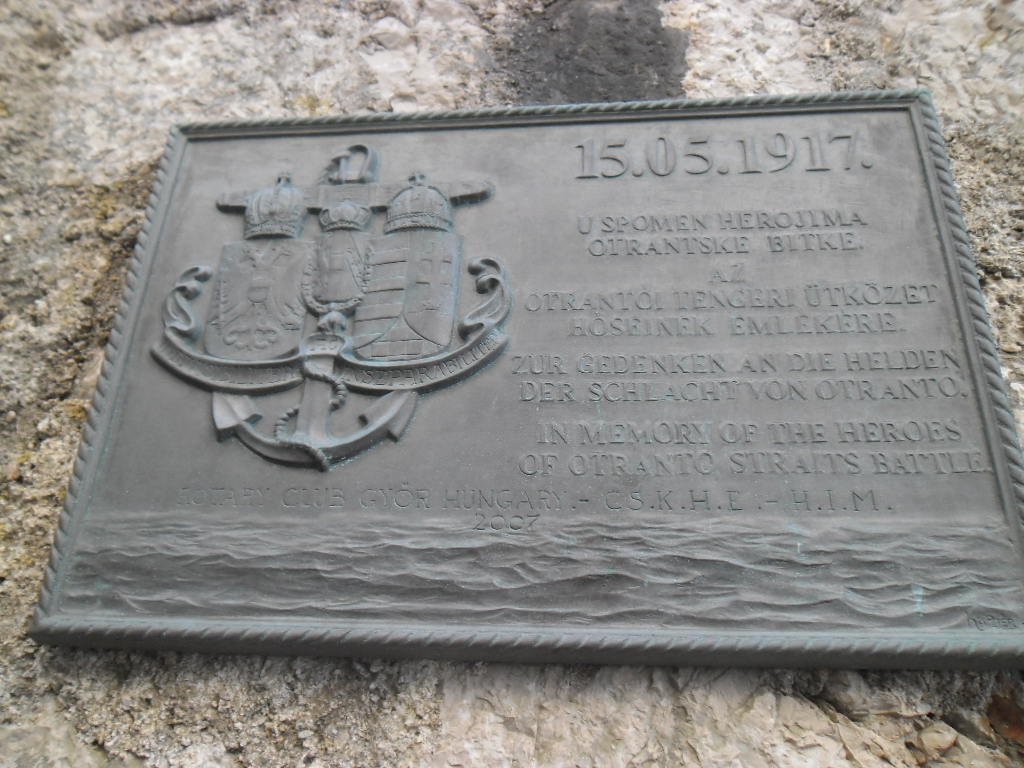
Plaque

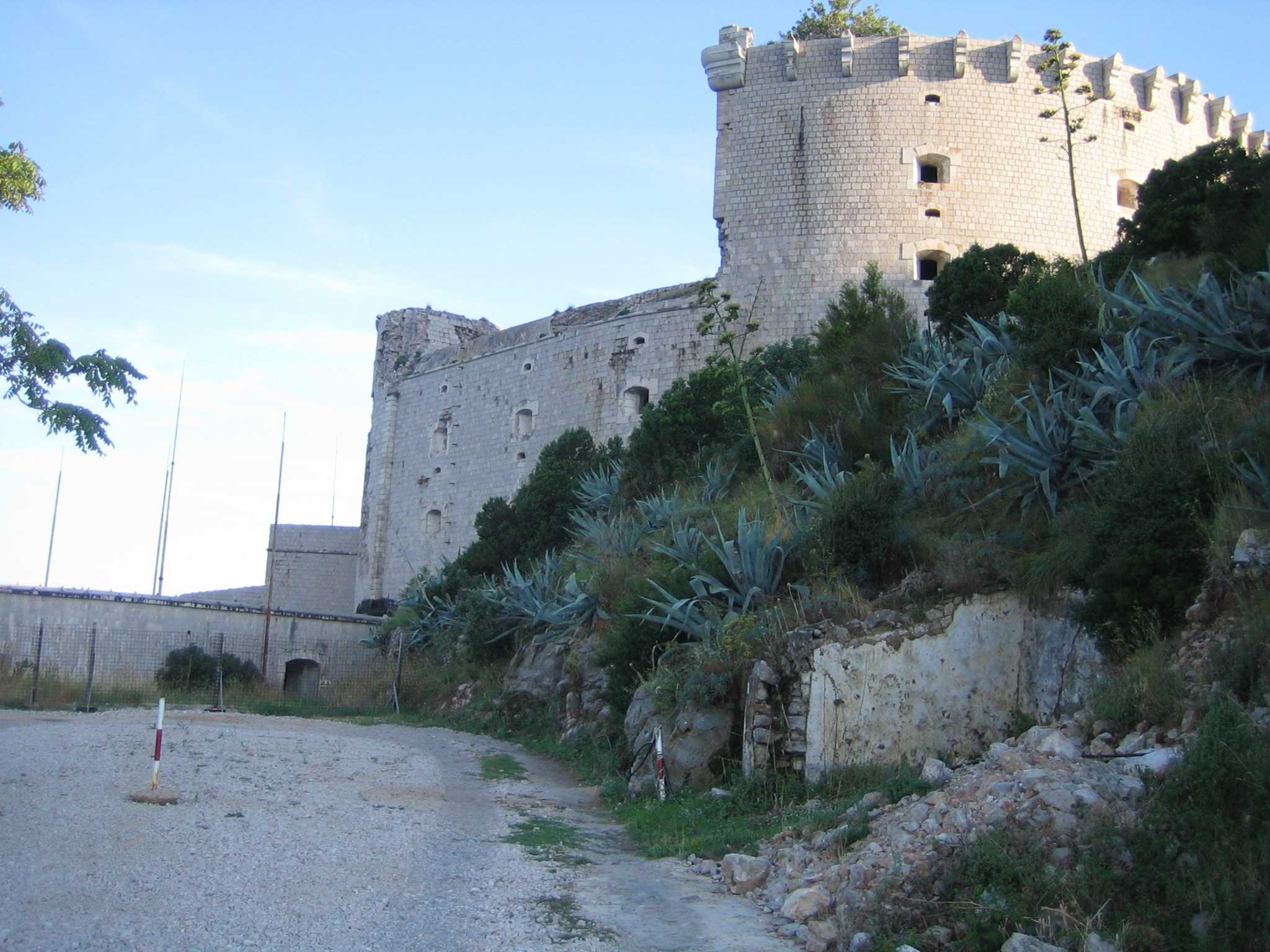
Walls on the landward side

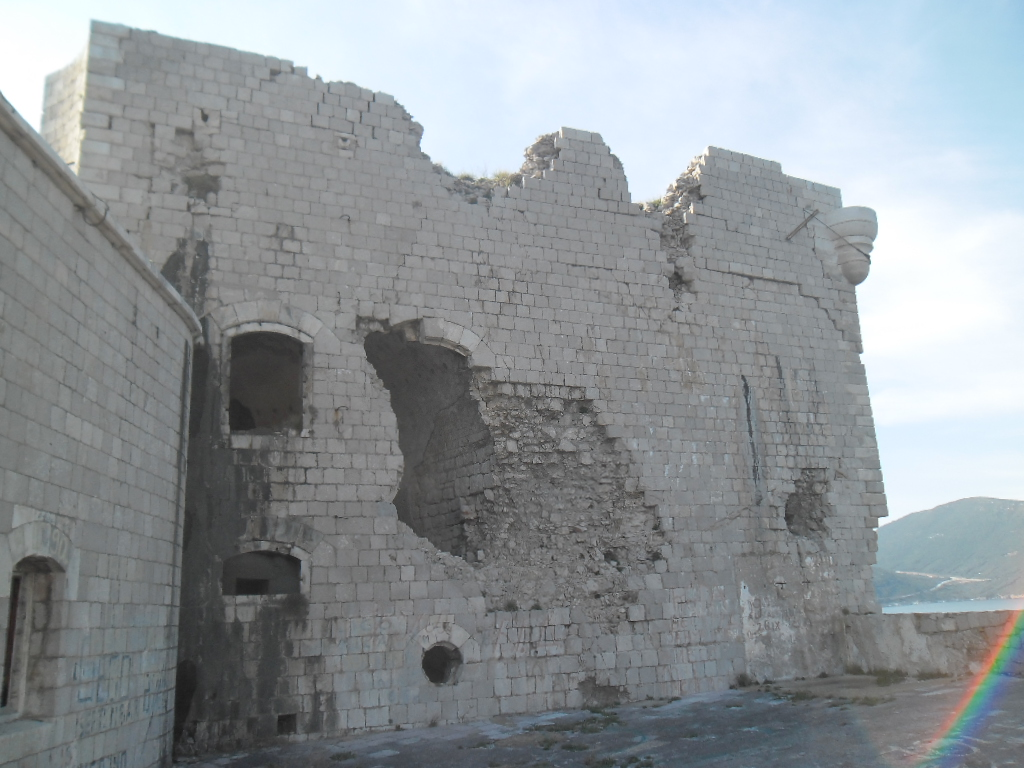
Damage to one of the walls

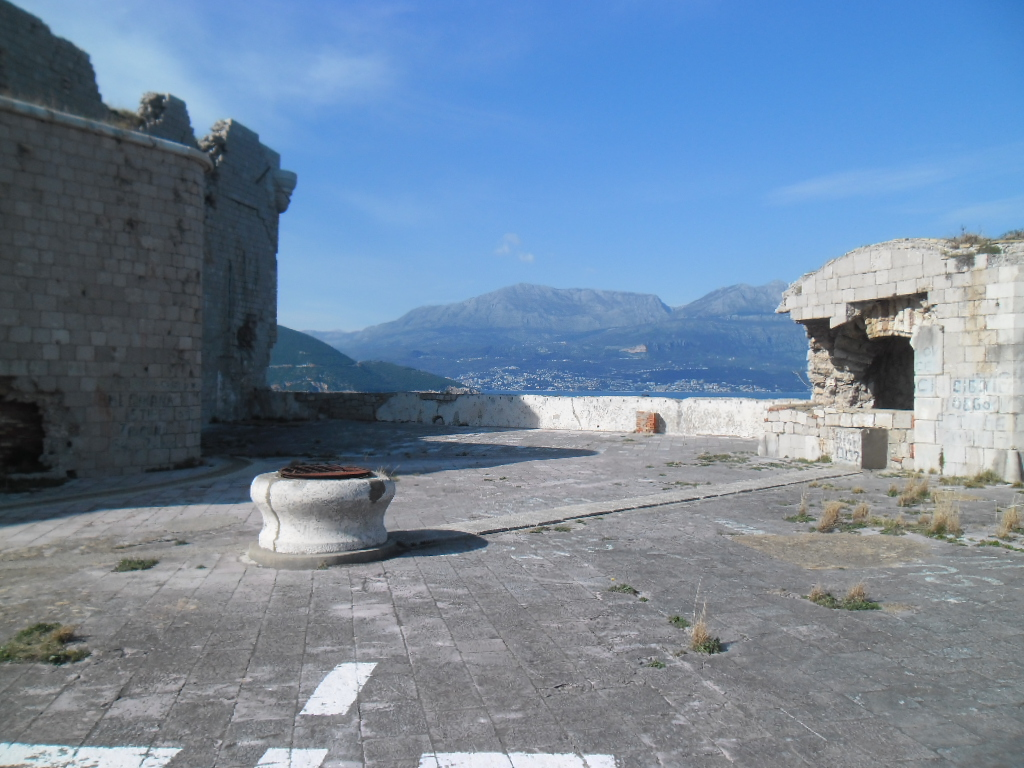
View from the fort
