= Mamula (disambiguation) =

Mamula is an islet in Montenegro.

Mamula may also refer to the following individuals:

- Branko Mamula (1921–2021), Serbian admiral in Yugoslav service
- Lazarus von Mamula, Slavic Lazar Mamula, general of the Austrian Empire
- Mike Mamula, American football player
- Nada Mamula, Serbian singer
- Ned Mamula, American economic geologist
