= Prevlaka =

Border dispute in Europe

Coordinates: 42°23′57″N 18°31′04″E

- Interactive map of Prevlaka

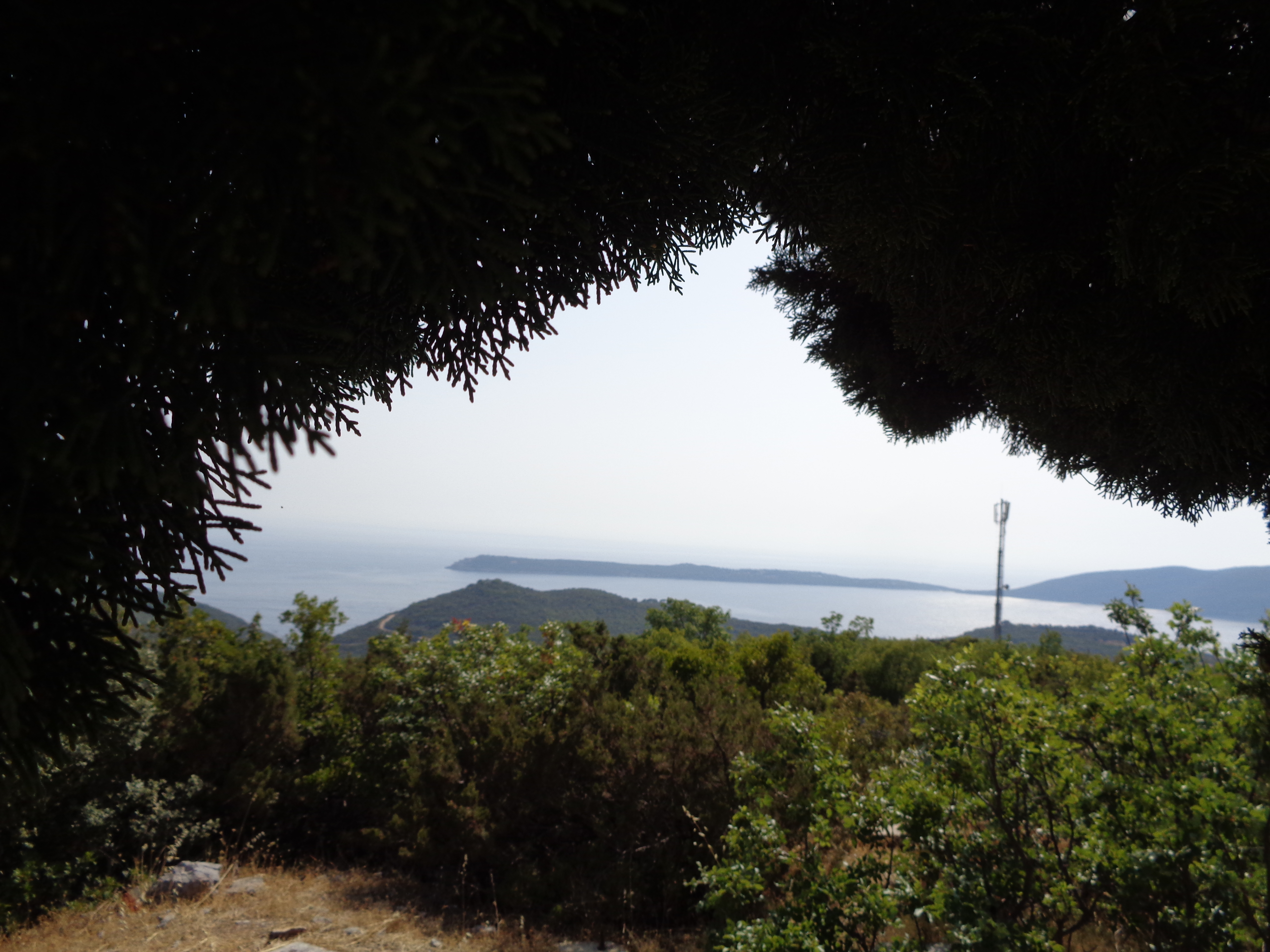
Fort Prevlaka on the Prevlaka peninsula.

Prevlaka (pronounced [prɛ̂ʋlaka]) is a small peninsula in southern Croatia, near the border with Montenegro, at the entrance to the Bay of Kotor on the eastern Adriatic coast.

Because of its strategic location in the southern Adriatic, in the aftermath of the SFR Yugoslav breakup, the peninsula became subject to a territorial dispute between Croatia and FR Yugoslavia, a federal state that included Montenegro. The territory was functional under UN until 2002. The UN mission ended in December 2002 and the territory that had previously been part of SR Croatia was returned to the Republic of Croatia. An agreement was signed by both sides five days before the departure of the UNMOP that demilitarized Prevlaka, though implementation still has a temporary character.

== Geography ==
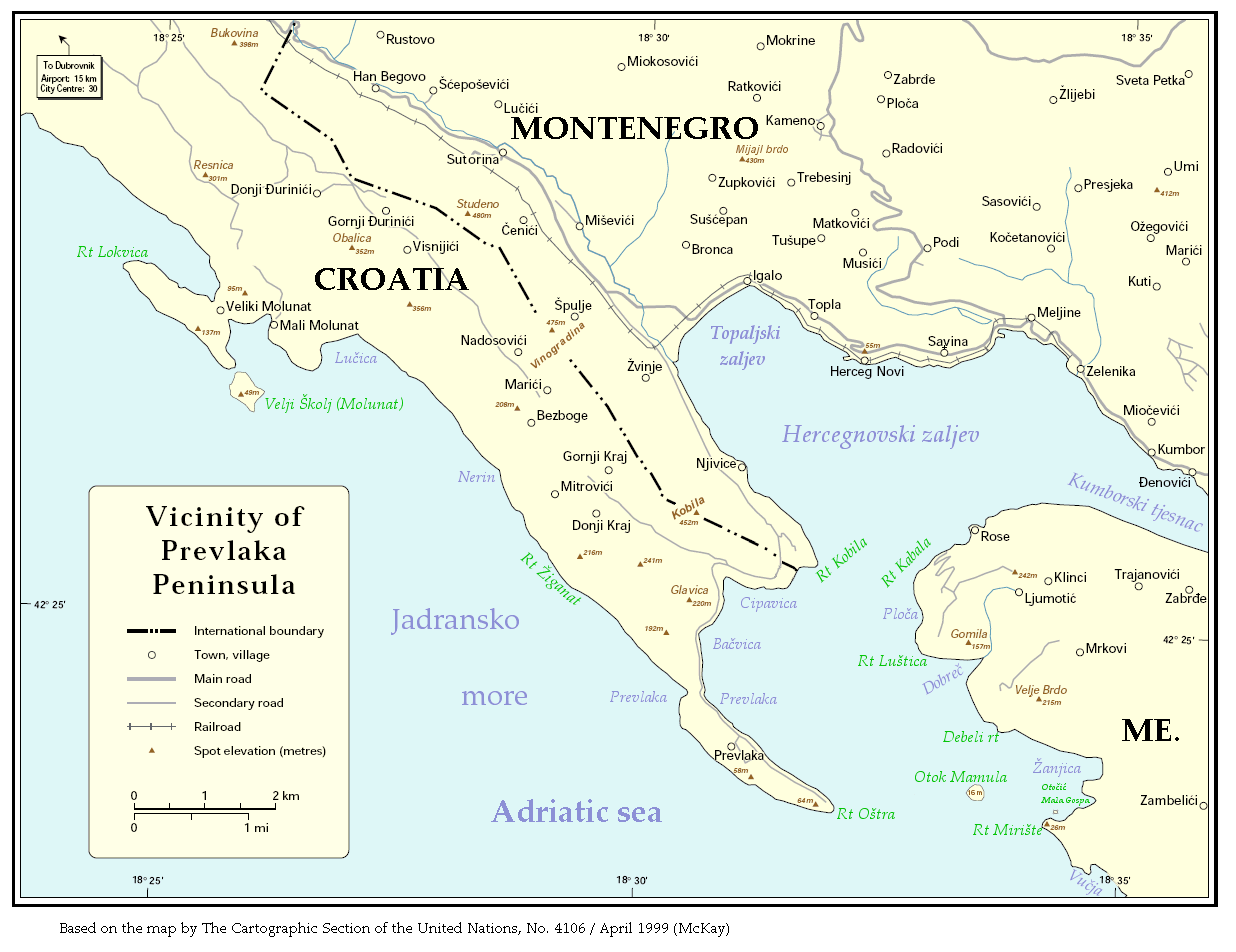
Vicinity of Prevlaka peninsula

The narrow, uninhabited peninsula is 2.6 kilometres (1.6 mi) long and only 150–500 metres (500–1,600 ft) wide, covering an area of 93.33 hectares (230.6 acres) (just under 1 square kilometre or 0.4 square miles).

The word prevlaka means 'portage'. Cape Oštro (Punta Oštro/Punta d'Ostro), located at the very tip of the peninsula, is the southernmost point of mainland in Croatia. Along with the small Montenegrin island of Mamula, which sits some 2 kilometres (1.2 mi) east of Cape Oštro, in addition to being two sides of an international maritime border, the two spots present observation entry points into the Bay of Kotor.

North of the Prevlaka isthmus, just within the Bay of Kotor, lie the two less prominent capes Konfin and Kobila, to the northwest of which is a road border crossing between Croatia and Montenegro. The D516 highway connects it to Konavle and the D8; northwards the road connects to Njivice, Sutorina, and Igalo.

== History ==
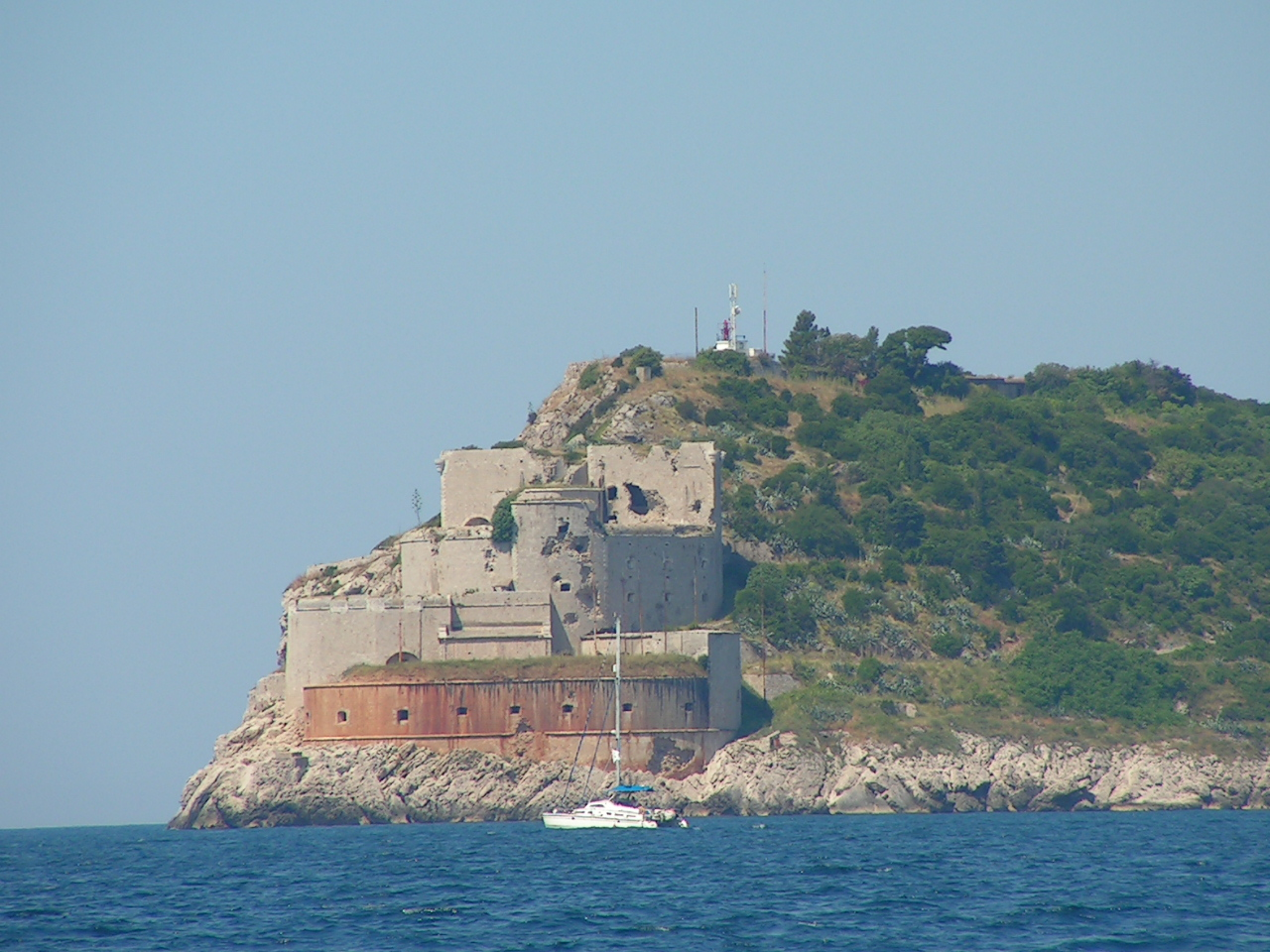
Prevlaka Fortress at the Bay of Kotor entrance

Konavle and the Prevlaka peninsula was bought by the Republic of Ragusa from the Bosnian Kingdom in the early 15th century to protect its eastern flank. Ragusans fortified Cape Oštro in 1441. Cape Kobila was the boundary with Sutorina under the Ottoman Empire's control since 1699.

In 1806, during Napoleon's conquest of Europe, King Alexander I of Russia was intent on stopping French advances in the Adriatic and to that end deployed a Mediterranean expedition led by vice-admiral Dmitry Senyavin, that by September 1806 made considerable territorial gains in the area, including Prevlaka and the entire Bay of Kotor. In July 1807, the Russians and the French struck a deal in the first Treaty of Tilsit for the area to be handed over to the First French Empire. In 1808, the French assigned the newly acquired territory over to their client state called the Napoleonic Kingdom of Italy before in 1810 reassigning it back into the First French Empire proper as part of the Illyrian Provinces, their recently created autonomous subdivision.

Following Napoleon's defeat, former Ragusan territory including Prevlaka came under the rule of the Austrian Empire in 1813. Austrian rule was ratified by the Congress of Vienna in 1815, and the territory became part of its newly created internal administrative subdivision, the Kingdom of Dalmatia. It remained as such after the transformation of Austrian Empire into the dual monarchy of Austria-Hungary following the Congress of Berlin in 1867. Towards the end of the 19th century, on the suggestion of General Lazar Mamula, the Austro-Hungarian authorities decided to build a fort on cape Oštro, along with a fortress on the island of Mamula and a fort on cape Mirište in order to ensure military control over the entrance into the Bay of Kotor. The Austrian authorities successfully fortified capes Mirište, Oštro and the islet of Mamula creating the first line of Boka fortress system. The authorities reportedly also decided to compensate local farmers for the expropriated land, but no money was paid until the collapse of the dual monarchy.

In 1918, after the end of World War I and collapse of Austria-Hungary, Prevlaka became part of the newly created Kingdom of Serbs, Croats and Slovenes. By 1922, once the new state determined its internal administrative subdivisions, dividing its territory into 33 oblasts, the peninsula got included in kingdom's Dubrovnik Oblast. In 1929, as Kingdom of SCS transformed into the Kingdom of Yugoslavia along with its internal administrative subdivisions being reconfigured into 9 banovinas, Prevlaka was included into Zeta Banovina together with Dubrovnik. During the 1930s, Royal Yugoslav Army further fortified Prevlaka. In 1939, the area was assigned to the newly created Banovina of Croatia subdivision of the Yugoslav kingdom.

World War II was the only period since the 15th century when the boundaries of Konavle were modified. In April 1941 Nazi Germany invaded Yugoslavia, conquering it in less than three weeks before proceeding to dismember its territory by creating a handful of locally administered fascist puppet states. Due to its strategic importance, the Axis-aligned Kingdom of Italy under prime minister Benito Mussolini would not let either of the two newly propped up local fascist puppet regimes, the Independent State of Croatia or the Italian governorate of Montenegro, control the Bay of Kotor region. The Bay of Kotor along with its surrounding areas including eastern Konavle and Prevlaka was controlled directly by Italy based on the May 1941 Treaties of Rome.

As World War II dragged on, in summer 1943, in response to the Allied advances in their Italian campaign, Nazi Germany took over the administration of the Bay of Kotor including Prevlaka. On 22 December 1944, the Yugoslav Partisans took control of the region, and after the war Prevlaka became part of the newly proclaimed FPR Yugoslavia, specifically its constituent unit the People's Republic of Croatia.

In 1955, the Yugoslav People's Army (JNA) closed down access to Prevlaka because of its coastal artillery installations.

During the Yugoslav Wars that followed the breakup of Yugoslavia, the territory was occupied by Yugoslav forces like most of the Dubrovnik region during the siege of Dubrovnik. At one point, the Croatian military gained temporary control over Prevlaka, before it was retaken. The two sides agreed on the demilitarization of the peninsula and the United Nations Security Council Resolution 779 of October 6, 1992 extended the mandate of UNPROFOR to the implementation of this agreement, together with the European Community Monitoring Mission. A resolution to the conflict took shape in 1996 when the United Nations mediated the conflict and established an observer mission (UNMOP) which oversaw the demilitarization and acted as a buffer.

The Konfin/Kobila border crossing has operated since 1999.

The UN mission ended in December 2002 and the territory that had previously been part of SR Croatia was returned to the Republic of Croatia. An agreement was signed by both sides five days before the departure of the UNMOP that demilitarized Prevlaka, though implementation still has a temporary character.

In 2002, the two states agreed on a temporary solution stipulating that Croatia would receive the entire land mass of the Prevlaka peninsula including some 500 metres (1,600 ft) of the sea belt entrance into Boka Kotorska while the sea bay on the side of Prevlaka facing Herceg Novi was declared no man's waters.

Montenegro became independent in 2006 and the temporary agreement remained in effect. In 2008, a mixed commission was created, tasked with preparing the legal case for the border settlement in front of the International Court of Justice at The Hague. In search of the permanent border settlement, the two states have the option of settling the issue between themselves bilaterally or opting for the international arbitration. In the end, they established diplomatic relations and expressed readiness for cooperation.

== Gallery ==
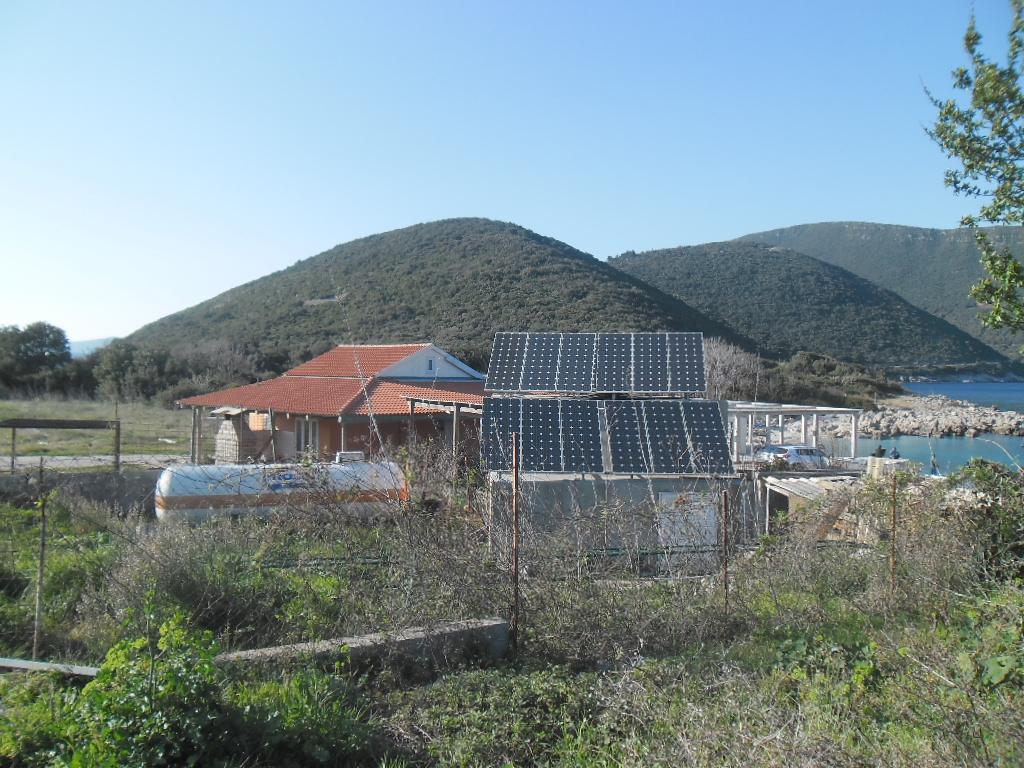

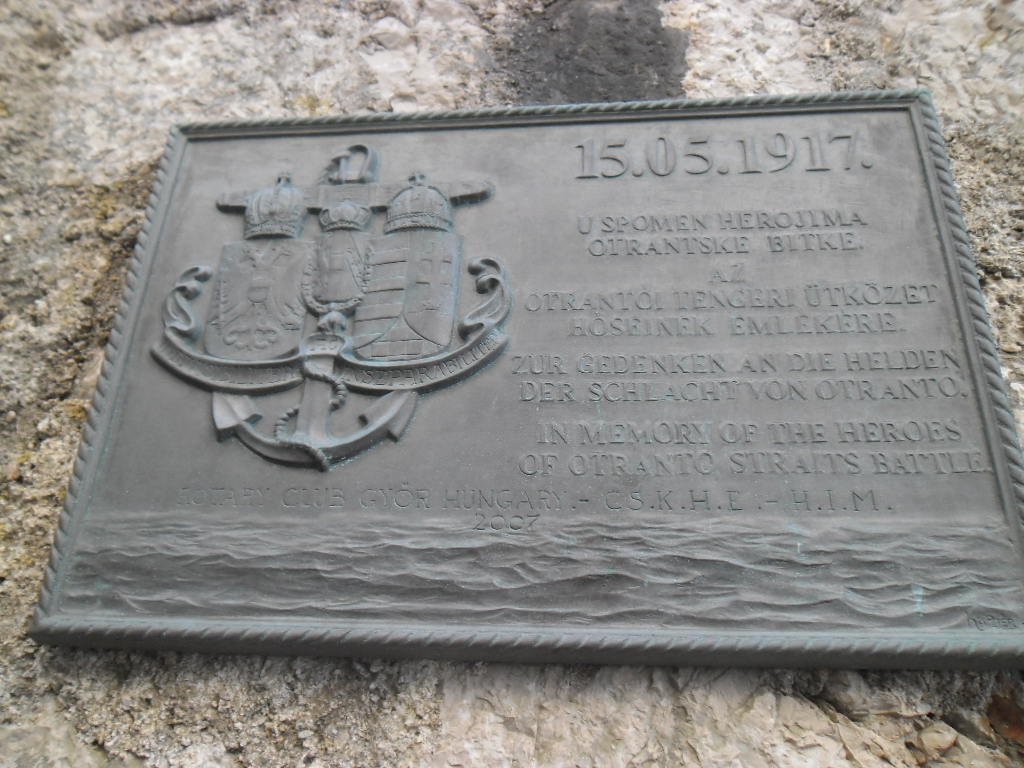

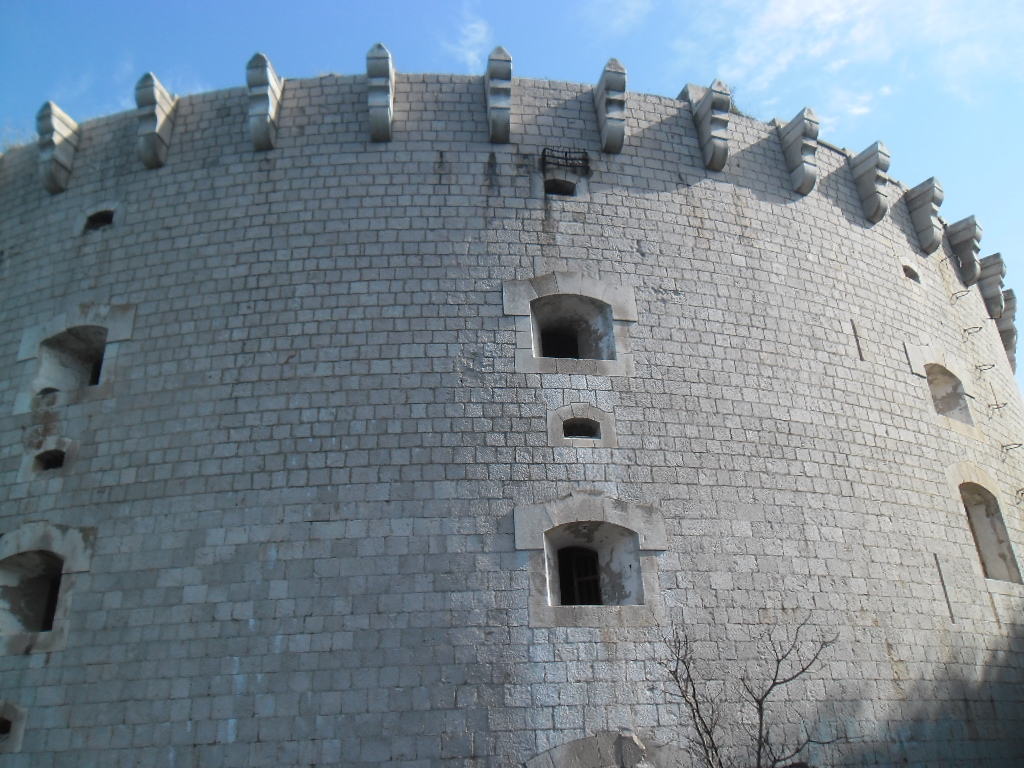

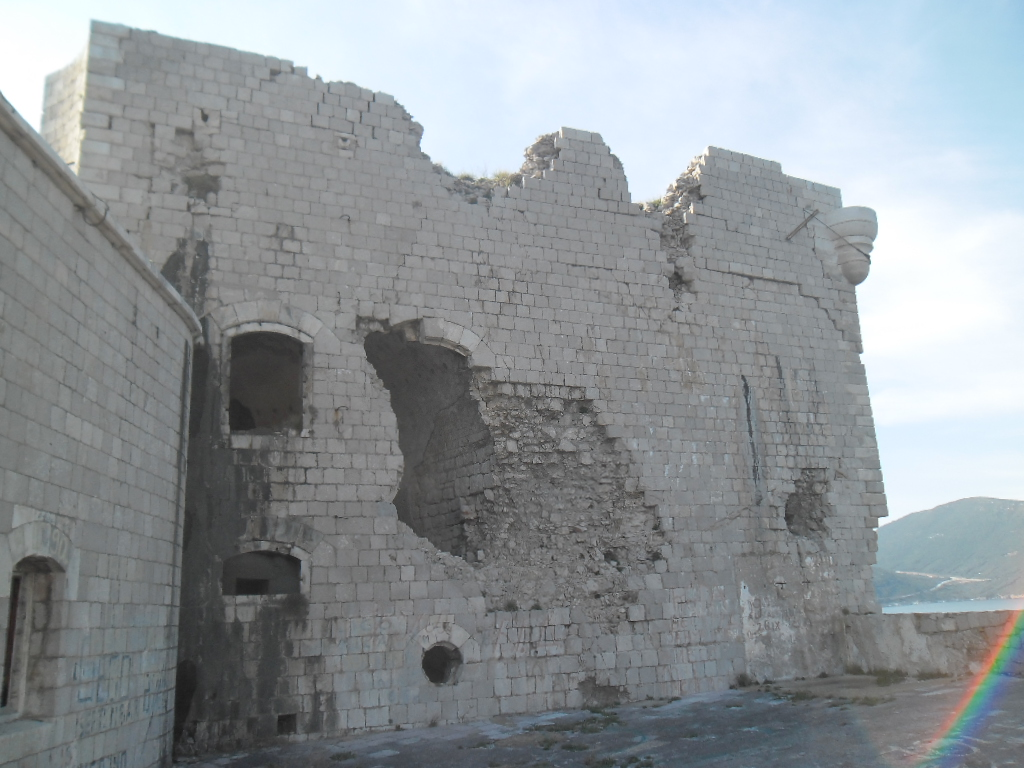

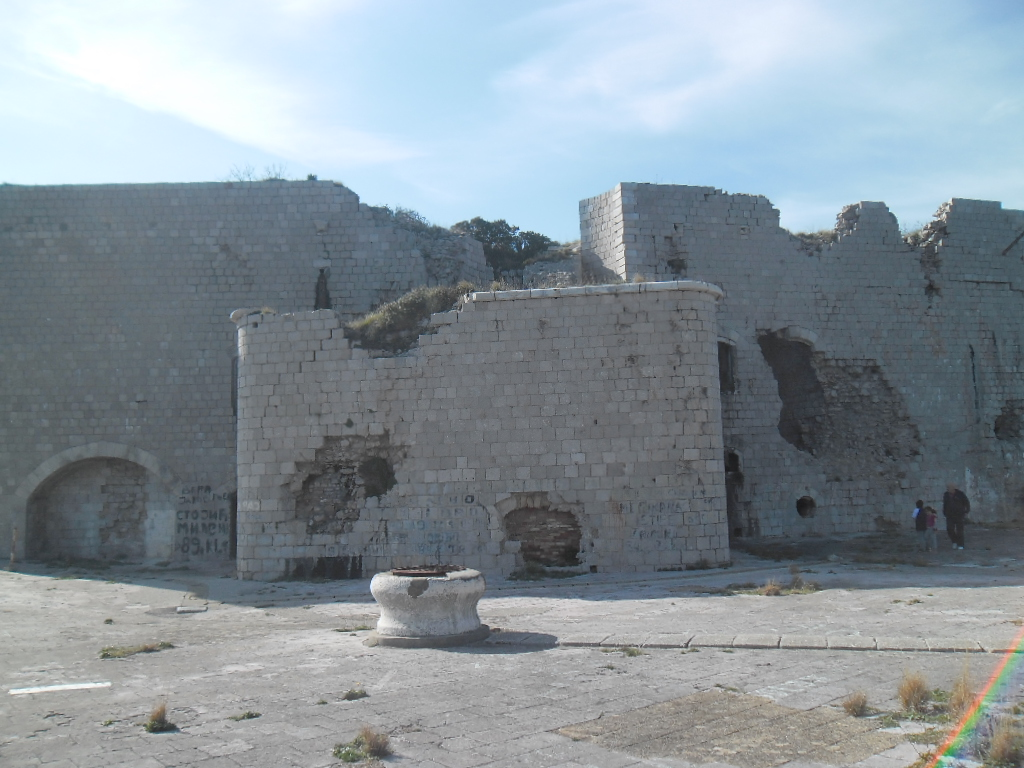

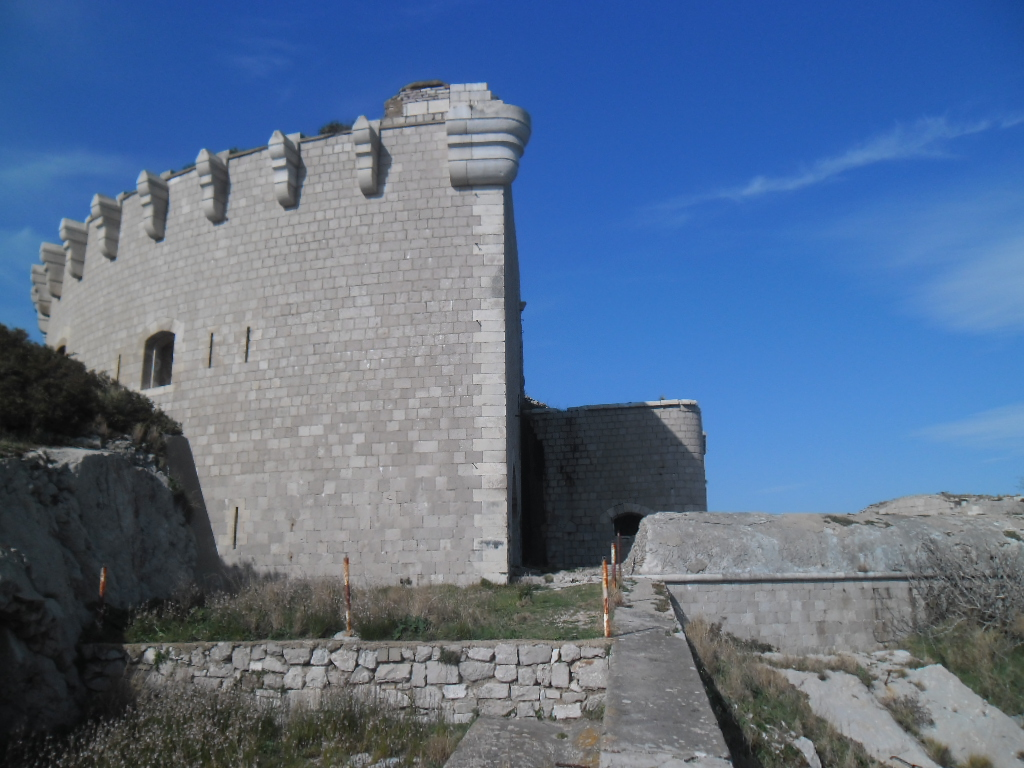

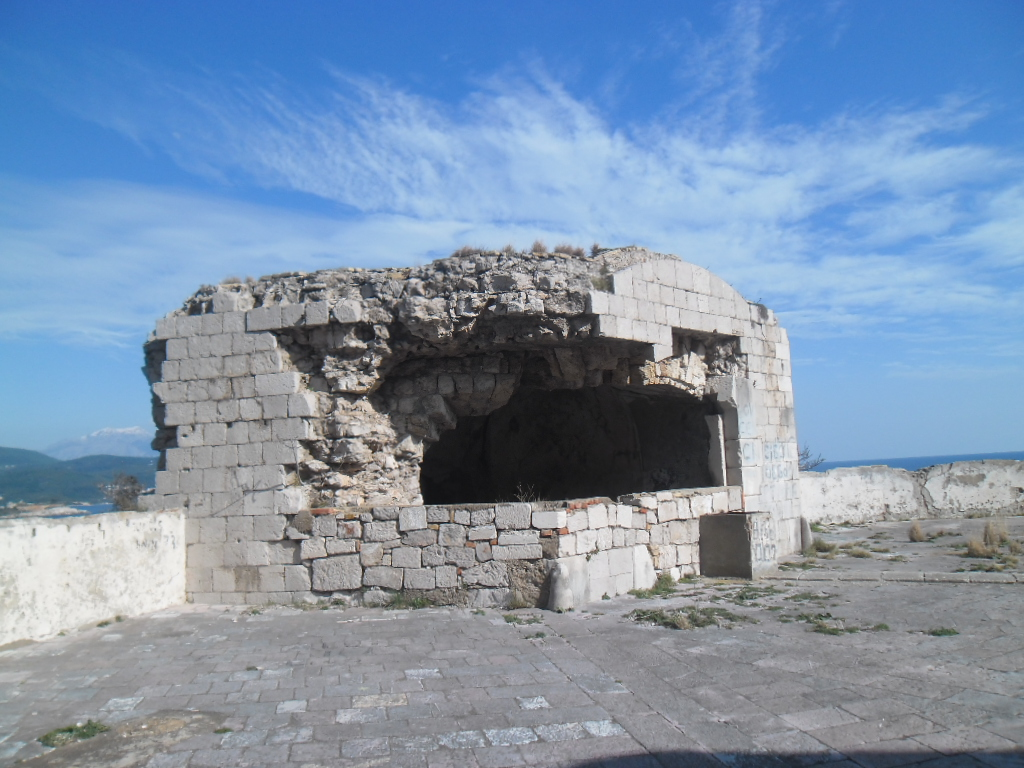

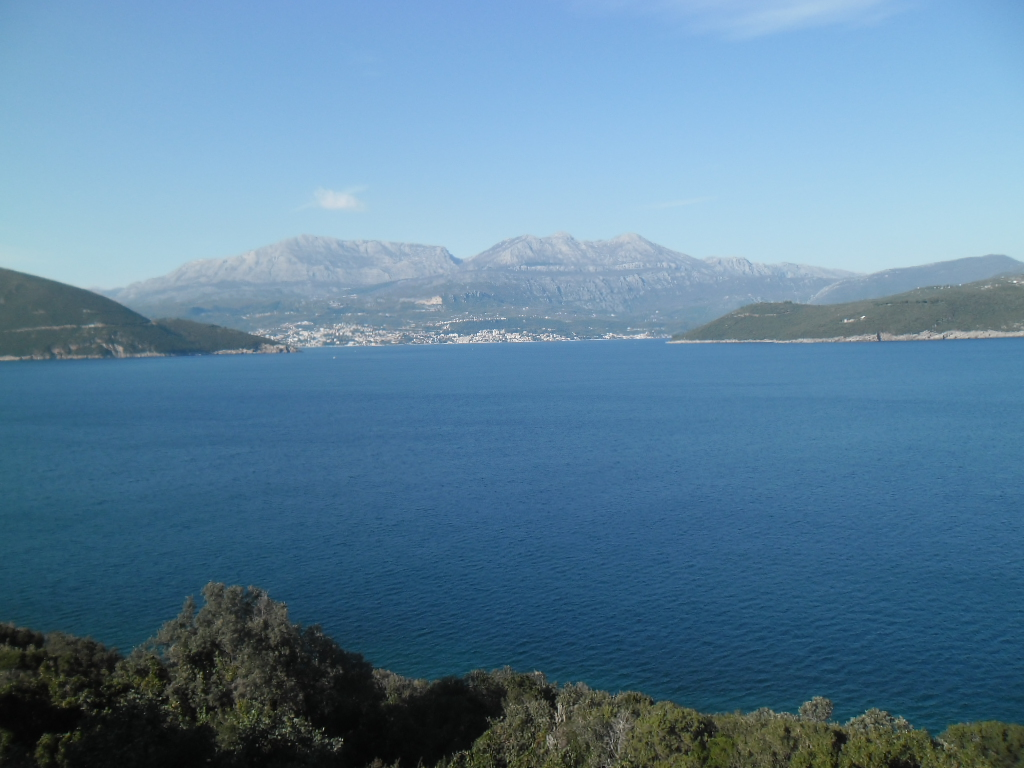

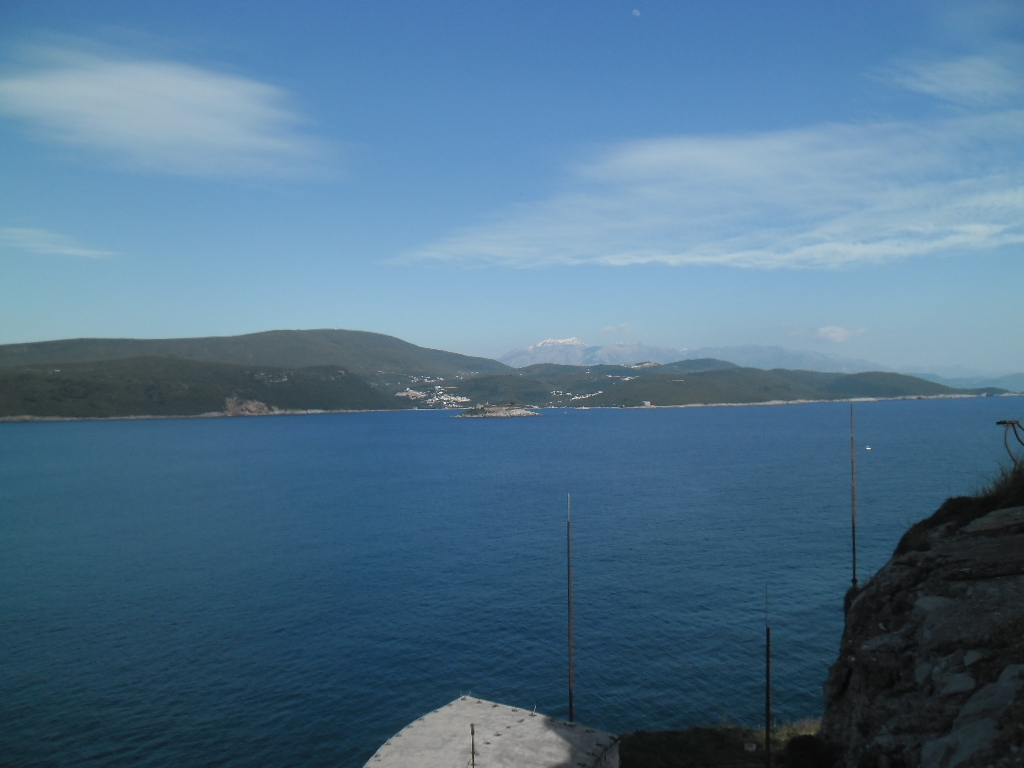

== Sources ==
- Blake, Gerald Henry; Topalović, Duško (1996). Clive H. Schofield; Mladen Klemenčić (eds.). The maritime boundaries of the Adriatic Sea. IBRU. pp. 42–43. ISBN 978-1-897643-22-8.
