= Fort Arza =

- Tvrđava Arza
- Cape Arza, Luštica, Herceg Novi Municipality, Montenegro
- Fort Arza (left) and the monastery at Žanjice (right)

Site information
- Type: Coastal fort
- Owner: RCG Invest (since 2005)
- Condition: Disused; closed to the public

Location
- Location within Montenegro
- Coordinates: 42°23′29.6″N 18°34′14.1″E

Site history
- Built: mid-19th century
- Built by: Austrian Empire
- Materials: stone

Fort Arza (Montenegrin: Tvrđava Arza, Тврђава Арза) is a 19th-century coastal fort on Cape Arza, at the southern tip of the Luštica peninsula in Herceg Novi Municipality, Montenegro. Standing at the entrance to the Bay of Kotor, it was built by the Austrian Empire at the same time as the fortress on the island of Mamula, and together with Mamula and Fort Prevlaka on Cape Oštro it formed the first line of defence of the Boka fortress system. Sold to a private consortium in 2005, the fort is not protected as a cultural property of Montenegro.

== History ==
After the Congress of Vienna in 1815 assigned the former Venetian possessions on the eastern Adriatic to the Habsburg monarchy, the Bay of Kotor became, together with Pula, one of its principal naval bases, and over the following decades it was ringed with a system of fortifications known as the Fortress of Boka. Fort Arza was built at the tip of the Luštica peninsula at the same time as the fortress on Mamula, whose construction began while General Lazar Mamula was governor of Dalmatia. With the fort on Cape Oštro, the two guarded the entrance to the bay.

== Ownership and protection ==
In September 2005, the army of Serbia and Montenegro sold the fort, together with 110,000 square metres (11 ha) of surrounding coastal land, at an international tender to a Russian–Serbian consortium for €4.5 million. The consortium, made up of two Moscow-based companies and the Montenegrin firms Trade Unique and RCG Invest, announced plans for a luxury tourist complex worth €100 million, but no investment had been made by 2023. In the land registry the fort is recorded as a 430 m^{2} "residential building" owned by RCG Invest, and the complex has been repeatedly advertised for sale.

Despite repeated announcements, the Government of Montenegro has not declared the fort a cultural property. In February 2022 the then director of the Directorate for the Protection of Cultural Property, archaeologist Mladen Zagarčanin, launched a protection initiative with Arza as its first priority, but the process was left unfinished after his dismissal. In December 2023 the Ministry of Spatial Planning, Urbanism and State Property announced that it would form a working group to protect the state's interests in the site. Arza is one of around 120 Austro-Hungarian military fortifications in Montenegro without protected status.

== See also ==
- Fort Prevlaka
- Fortress Mamula
- Fort Kosmač
