= Njivice, Herceg Novi =

Njivice Њивице
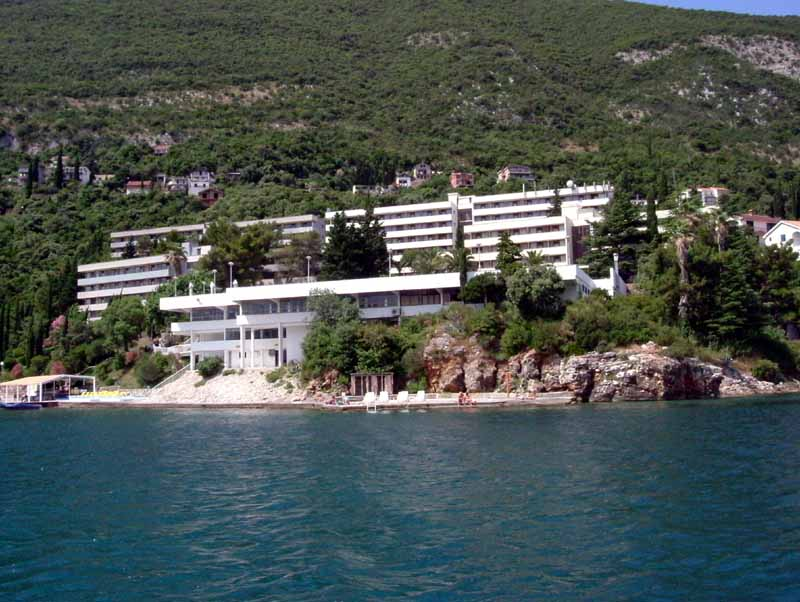
- Riviera Hotels in Njivice

- Location within Montenegro
- Coordinates: 42°26′10″N 18°30′50″E
- Country: Montenegro
- Region: Coastal
- Municipality: Herceg Novi
- Time zone: UTC+1 (CET)
  - Summer (DST): UTC+2 (CEST)

Njivice (Montenegrin Cyrillic: Њивице) is a village in the Herceg Novi Municipality in Montenegro. Located at the entrance into Boka Kotorska, it provides a view of the town of Herceg Novi and Mount Orjen. It is part of an area known as Provodina.

Njivice's microclimate supports a variety of non-native plants, including fruit-bearing species such as Japanese medlar, jujube, kiwi, banana and service tree.

Although geographically slightly isolated, Njivice has organized bus transport to Herceg Novi over the course of the entire calendar year. During the tourist season in the summer months, there are numerous boating companies that offer transportation to various tourist attractions on the nearby Luštica peninsula. These include Dobreč beach, Mamula islet, Žanjice beach, the Plava Špilja cave, and the village of Rose.
