= Luštica =

Peninsula in Montenegro

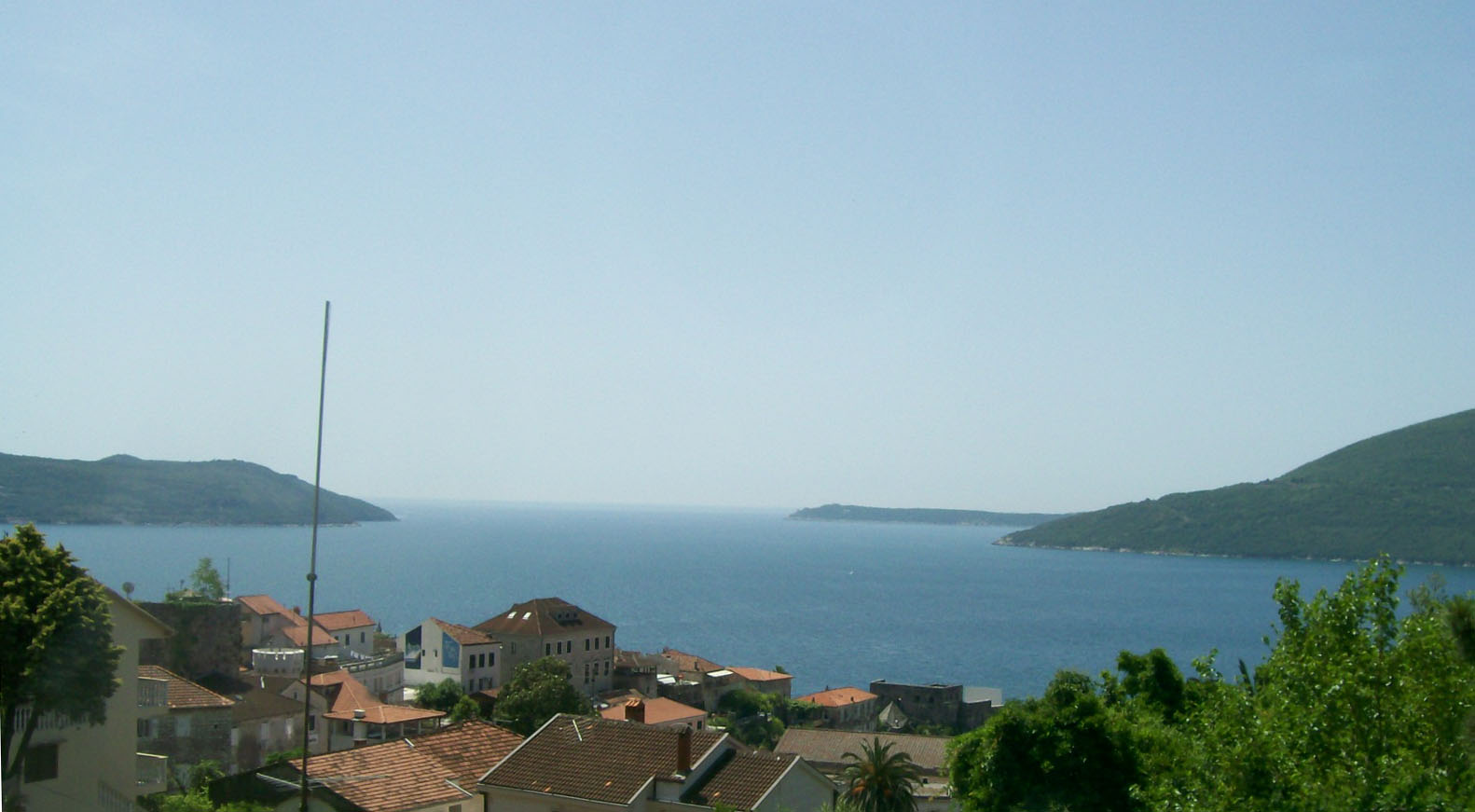
View of Luštica (to the left) and Prevlaka (to the right, at the distance) from Herceg Novi

Luštica (Montenegrin: Луштица, pronounced [lûːʃtit͡sa]) is a peninsula on the south Adriatic Sea, located at the entrance of the Bay of Kotor (Serbo-Croatian: Boka kotorska or Boka) in southwestern Montenegro. It effectively separates Tivat Bay from the Adriatic.

The peninsula has an area of 47 km^{2} and is 13 km long. The highest point of the peninsula is Obosnik peak, at 582 m. It has 35 km of coast, which accounts for 12% of Montenegrin coastline. Lustica is divided between Herceg Novi and Tivat Montenegrin municipalities.

== Cultural heritage ==
The area has twenty churches, out of which eighteen Orthodox and two Catholic ones. Once an isolated community, there are farms and smallholders producing their own olive oil, cheese, prosciutto, wine and rakija from local ingredients.

== Natural history ==
Luštica is largely undeveloped with populations of wild boar, mongoose, jackal and edible dormice. Nightingales and Scops-owls can also be heard in abundance. Olive groves are also plentiful although many are uncultivated and overgrown.

== Military heritage ==
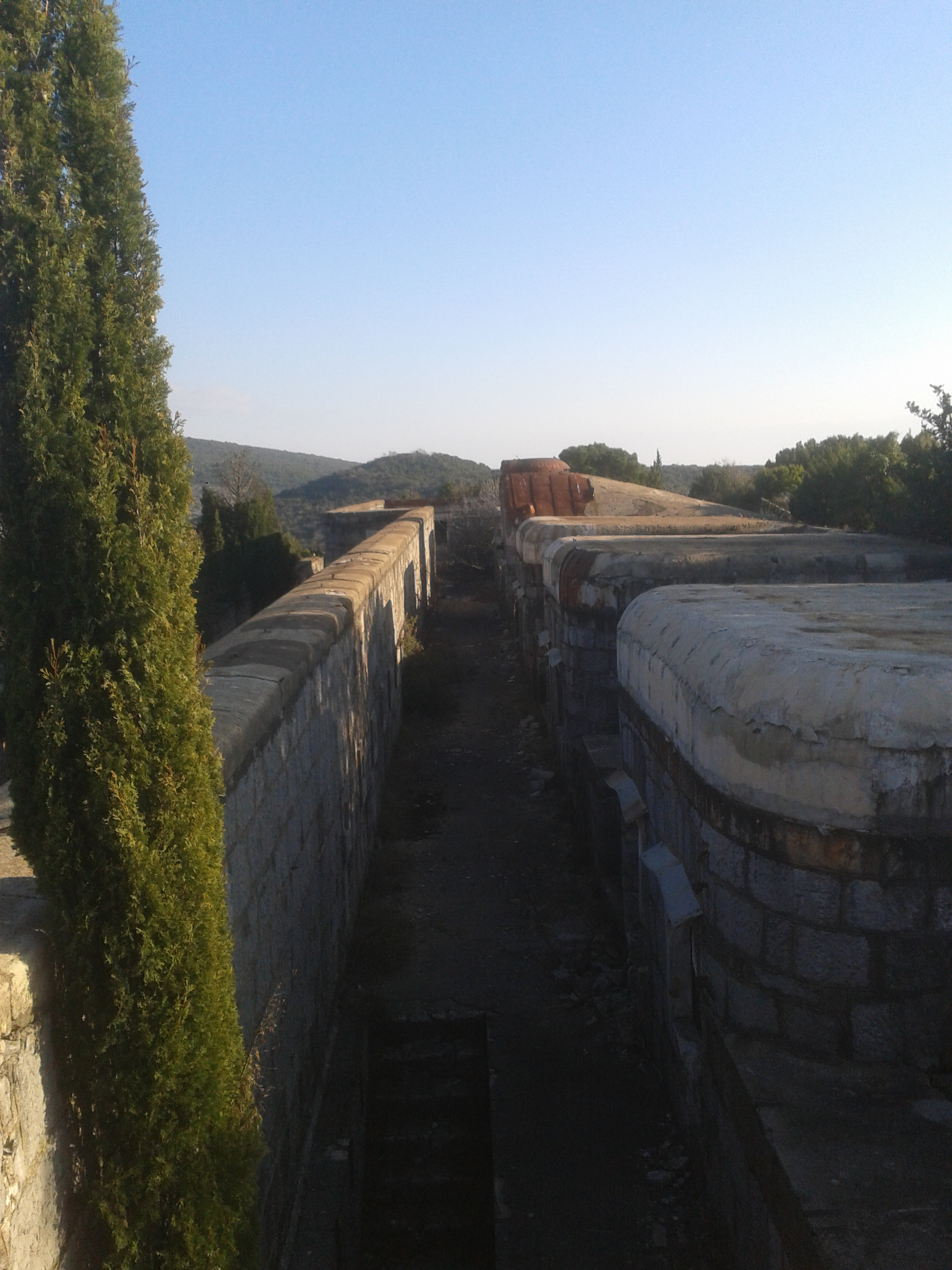
Austro-Hungarian fort Kabala at Luštica

The peninsula also has a significant military history with its location guarding the entrance into the Boka Kotorska, which housed military ports at Tivat during the interbellum and the Cold War period (Yugoslav Navy) as well as in Kotor earlier during the Austro-Hungarian period (Austro-Hungarian Navy).

There are disused Austrian-built fortifications at Rose, Mamula, Arza, and Montenegrin military installations at Rose (disused), Krašići and Obosnik. Three disused submarine hides are cut into the rock of the steep coast on Herceg Novi bay, and the Kumbor Strait. Since the closure of Tivat Naval Base,there was, previously, The Koni class frigate "Split", which was sent for scrapping in 2013, as well as DBM-241, which has now sunk,directly below the village of Zabrđe in the Kumbor strait.

== Tourism ==
On the northeast side there are fine views over Tivat and Herceg Novi bays of the Boka Kotorska and on the southwest side; fine views over the entrance of the Boka to the Adriatic Sea and of the Prevlaka Peninsula.

The Luštica peninsula is main excursion destination for tourists in Herceg Novi. It has the finest beaches and resorts in Herceg Novi municipality, including Žanjice, Mirište, Arza and Dobreč.

A small population is resident all year round with a large number of people resident for the summer months only. Historically these summer visitors have come from parts of the former Yugoslavia, particularly Serbia. Following the breakup of Yugoslavia, and with Montenegro gaining independence, Western Europeans and Russians have moved in, some permanently.

Close to Tivat Airport, a number of development projects have been proposed for the area, including golf courses. However, to date there is still very little tourism development with the main building activity limited to that close to Zanjice beach. However the scale is still very small.

The biggest tourist centre is Krašići with many houses and apartments for rent.

The scenery, clean seas, views, warm summers and relative isolation make Luštica a tourist destination.

== Villages ==
- Babunci
- Begovići
- Bjelila
- Brguli
- Đuraševići
- Eraci
- klinci village resort
- Klinci
- Krtoli
- Krašići
- Milovići
- Mitrovići
- Miževići
- Mrkovi
- Radovići
- Rose
- Tići
- Zabrđe or Zabrdje
- Zambelići
