= Krašići =

Krašići Крашићи
- Village
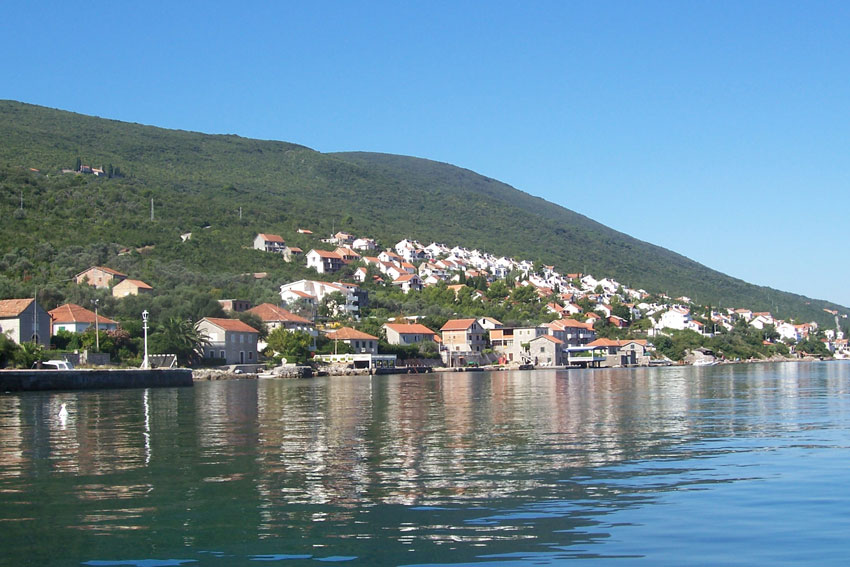
- View of Krašići

- Location within Montenegro
- Country: Montenegro
- Region: Coastal
- Municipality: Tivat

Population (2003)
  - Total: 130
- Time zone: UTC+1 (CET)
  - Summer (DST): UTC+2 (CEST)

Krašići (Montenegrin: Крашићи) is a settlement in the Tivat Municipality in Montenegro, located on the Luštica peninsula in the Bay of Kotor.

== Geography ==
Krašići is located on the Luštica peninsula, on the southern shore of the Bay of Tivat in the Bay of Kotor, between the villages of Tičići and Radovići. Old Krašići was located at mountain side, a few kilometers from its present location. This place is now called Gornji Krašići (Upper Krašići) or Stari Krašići (Old Krašići) and current village is sometimes called Donji Krašići (Lower Krašići).

== History ==
The village graveyard is still located in the old village. Villagers lived mostly from planting olives and vines and producing olive oil and wine.

After the great 1979 Montenegro earthquake, the village was heavily damaged and people have resettled on the current location at sea shore, which was prior to the earthquake used for small-scale fishing. In addition to their former occupations, they increased fishing, and, recently, tourism.

In the 1970s, some tourists started building houses around the village in larger numbers. This boomed and now they by far outnumber locals. The first tourist settlement is Krašići 1; after it, Krašići 2 was built. Tourists have also built the beach (which was a stony beach before that), streets and infrastructure in the settlement. Currently it has electricity, telephone and sewage and from not too long ago a functioning sewer and water system.

Houses in Krašići 1 and 2 are self-built by tourists; but after noticing the popularity of this location, the construction company Šumadija built a planned settlement in 1980 which is now called Krašići 2/2 (former Krašići 2 is now called Krašići 2/1) or sometimes Krašići - Šumadija or Krašići - Maslinjak (Maslinjak - olive plantation; because it is built in place of one). After that some people have self-built houses in Krašići 3.

== Demographics ==
According to the 2011 census, the village had 130 inhabitants, 33,85% Montenegrins, 20,77% Serbs and 20,77% Croats.

The only families which lived in the old, Gornji Krašići village, were Francisković, Slavović and Petrović. It was the only Catholic village on Luštica.

Original Krašići has some 150 houses; now, in addition to that, there are several big five star hotels held by locals. Krašići 2/1 has around 800 houses. Houses in Krašići 1 and 2 are self-built by tourists.

== Tourism ==
The village church has a relief depicting the battle of Lepetane which was taken from the church in the old village.

The village has one pier, with a navigational light, which encloses a small harbour; there is one more smaller harbour in the village.

The beach is concrete beach with gravel sea floor, with a number of beach bars.
