= Fortress Mamula =

Mamula Fortress
- Tvrđava Mamula
- Lastavica island, Herceg Novi Municipality, Montenegro
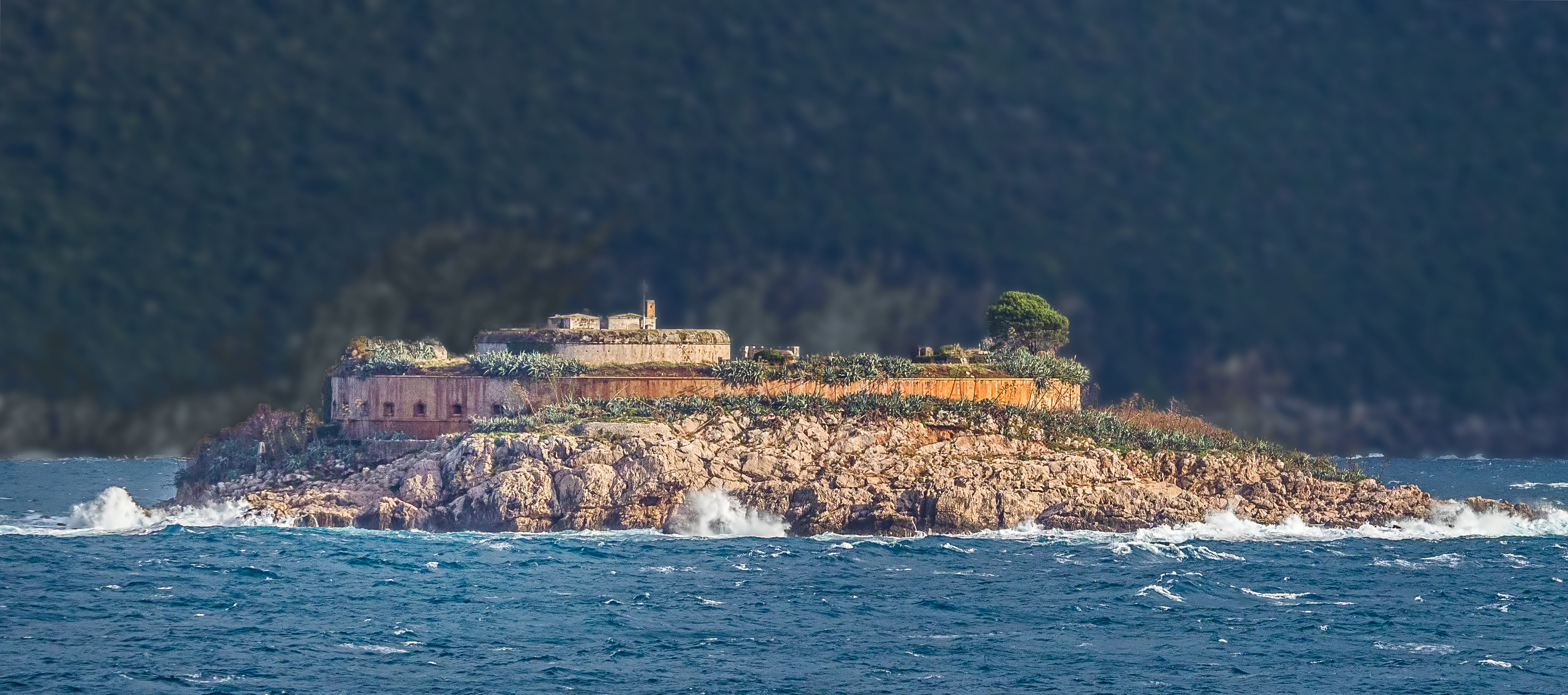
- Fortress Mamula (November 2017)

Site information
- Type: Coastal fortress
- Condition: Converted into a hotel (2023)

Location
- Location within Montenegro
- Coordinates: 42°23′43.4″N 18°33′29.0″E

Site history
- Built: mid-19th century
- Built by: Austrian Empire
- Materials: stone

Mamula Fortress (Montenegrin: Tvrđava Mamula, Тврђава Мамула) is a 19th-century Austrian fortress on the island of Lastavica, commonly known as Mamula, at the entrance to the Bay of Kotor in Montenegro. Named after General Lazar Mamula, during whose governorship of Dalmatia its construction began, it formed with Fort Arza and Fort Prevlaka the defences of the bay's entrance. During the Second World War, Fascist Italy used the fortress as a concentration camp in which more than 2,000 people were held. In 2015 the Montenegrin government leased the island and fortress for 49 years to the developer Orascom, and the fortress opened as a luxury hotel in 2023, a conversion that drew criticism over the site's history as a camp.
