= Fort Kosmač =

Austro-Hungarian fortification in Montenegro

- Tvrđava Kosmač
- Brajići, near Budva, Montenegro
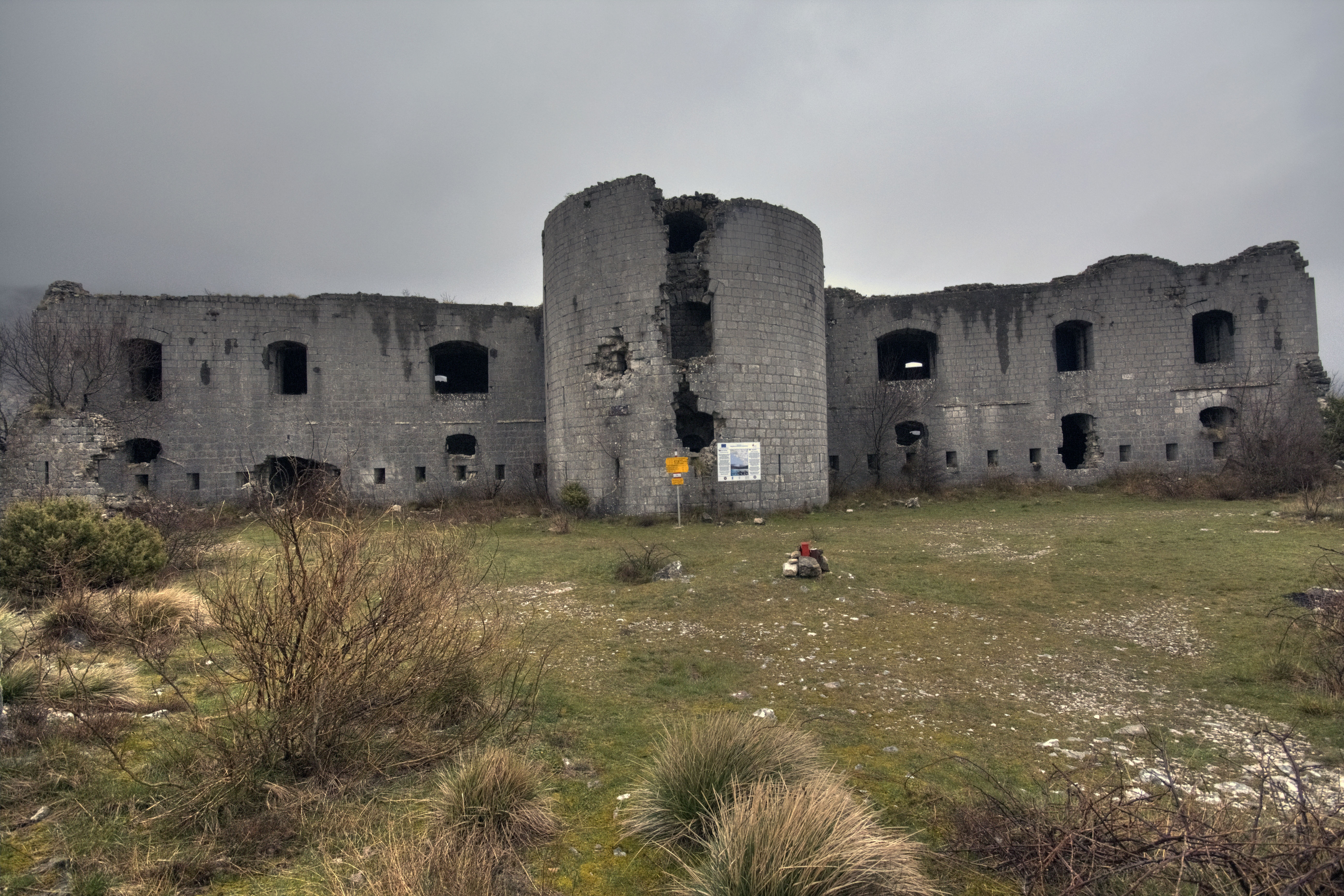
- View of the west side of the fort

Site information
- Type: Fortification
- Controlled by: Montenegro
- Condition: Abandoned

Location
- Location within Montenegro
- Coordinates: 42.301278°N 18.900270°E

Site history
- Built: ca. 1841–50
- Built by: Austro-Hungarian Empire
- In use: 1840s–1918 (Austro-Hungarian Empire); 1941–43 (Italy)
- Materials: Concrete, limestone
- Battles/wars: Krivošije rebellion (1869), First World War, Second World War

Fort Kosmač (Montenegrin: Tvrđava Kosmač, Тврђава Космач) was the southernmost fortress in the Austro-Hungarian Empire, guarding the southern extremity of the border between the empire and Montenegro. It is situated near the village of Brajići, on a hilltop overlooking the road between Budva on the coast and Cetinje, the Montenegrin capital at the time. Constructed in the 1840s, it was attacked during an 1869 rebellion and was garrisoned by Austrian troops until the fall of the empire in 1918. After passing to the newly established Yugoslavia, it was garrisoned again by Italian troops for a period in the Second World War. The building is now abandoned and in a ruinous condition.

== Background ==
Until 1918, the Austro-Hungarian Empire controlled a narrow coastal strip from Kotor (known then as Cattaro) to just south of Petrovac, previously known as the Venetian Albania. At Budva, about half-way along this strip, a road leads through the mountains above the town to Cetinje, the old Montenegrin capital. The area was of great strategic significance as it was the point at which the Austro-Hungarian, Montenegrin and (until 1878) Ottoman borders met.

In 1841 Prince Petar II Petrović-Njegoš of Montenegro reached an agreement with Austria under which the border between Montenegro and the empire was demarcated, and the Austrians recognised Montenegro's independence. Fort Kosmač was built as the southernmost part of a network of fortifications constructed by the Austrians around the Bay of Kotor and along the coastal strip. However, Austrian control of the area was not secure. Two serious rebellions were mounted by the powerful Krivošije clan who lived on the eastern flanks of Mount Orjen above Risan. In 1869 the clan defeated an Austro-Hungarian force sent to quell their rebellion, while their local allies attacked Fort Kosmač. A second rebellion in 1882 was eventually put down by the Austrians.

== Description ==
The fort is located on the hill of Kosmač, close to the village of Brajići on the Budva-Cetinje road, at an altitude of about 800 metres (2,600 ft) above sea level. It was constructed using finely-dressed limestone obtained from local quarries. The fort was built on a roughly north–south alignment and consists of a symmetrical building with two wings meeting a central semi-circular section at an angle of about 20 degrees. The end of each wing has a semi-circular extension that faces east at a right angle to the main line of the wing. This design gave the fort's defenders views in eight directions, with rectangular windows and large arched gun ports facing out over the hinterland. The central semicircular tower faces west and seaward.

The fort is now in a ruinous condition; it once had three storeys, but the topmost storey has collapsed entirely, leaving it roofless. The interior walls, floors and central staircase have also collapsed. Although the remains of the main staircase are still visible, the steps have disappeared entirely and the upper level cannot be reached, though there is nothing left of the upper floor to stand on in any case.

The interior of the fort is strewn with large quantities of fallen masonry, completely obscuring the original floor level. The extent of the collapse is so complete that it is no longer known how the interior was originally laid out. There are substantial holes in the interior's vaulted ceiling. The exterior has been subjected to some stone-robbing in pursuit of the finely-worked square blocks of grey limestone that were used to line the fort's outer walls.

Exterior features of Fort Kosmač
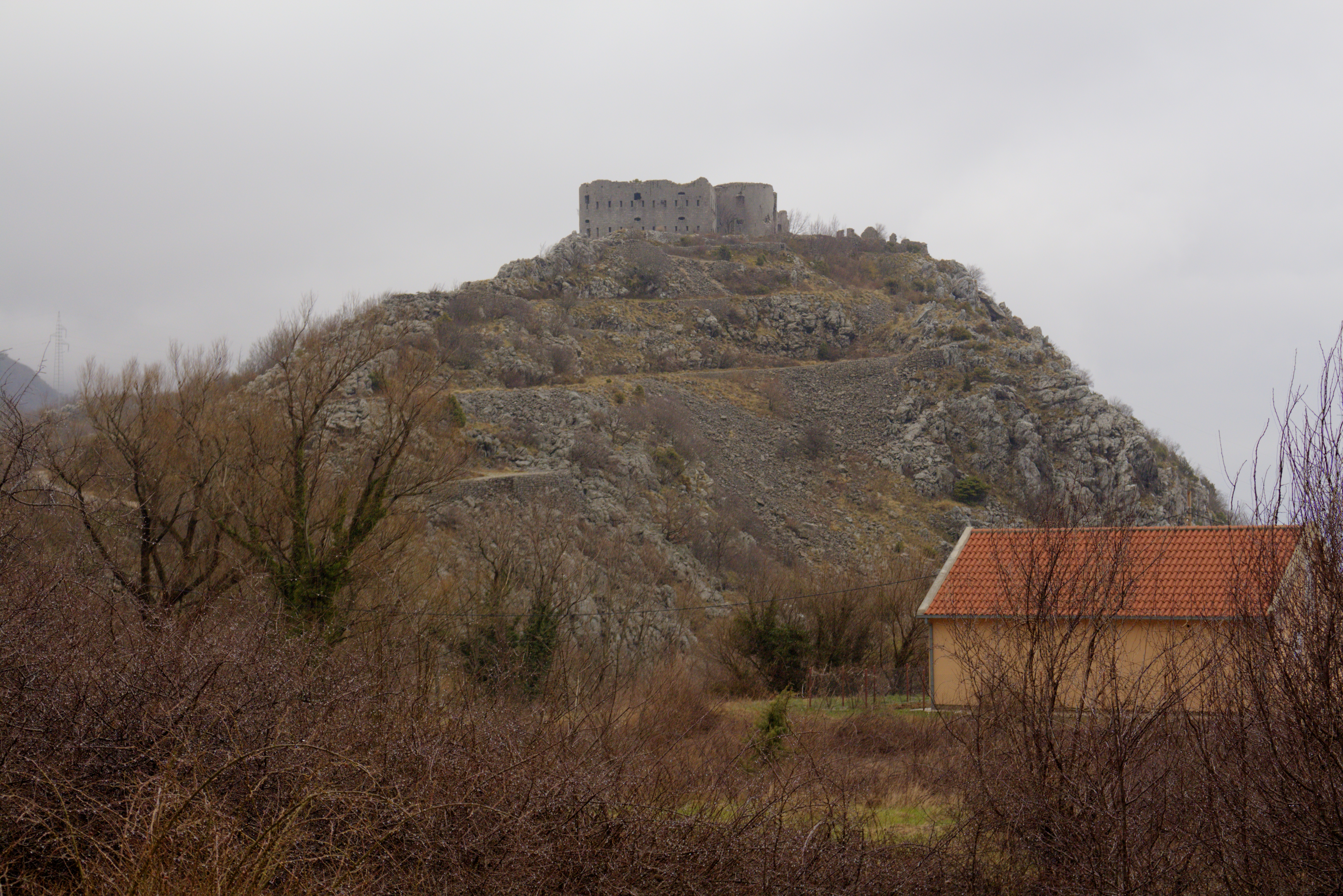
View of Fort Kosmač from the Budva-Cetinje road

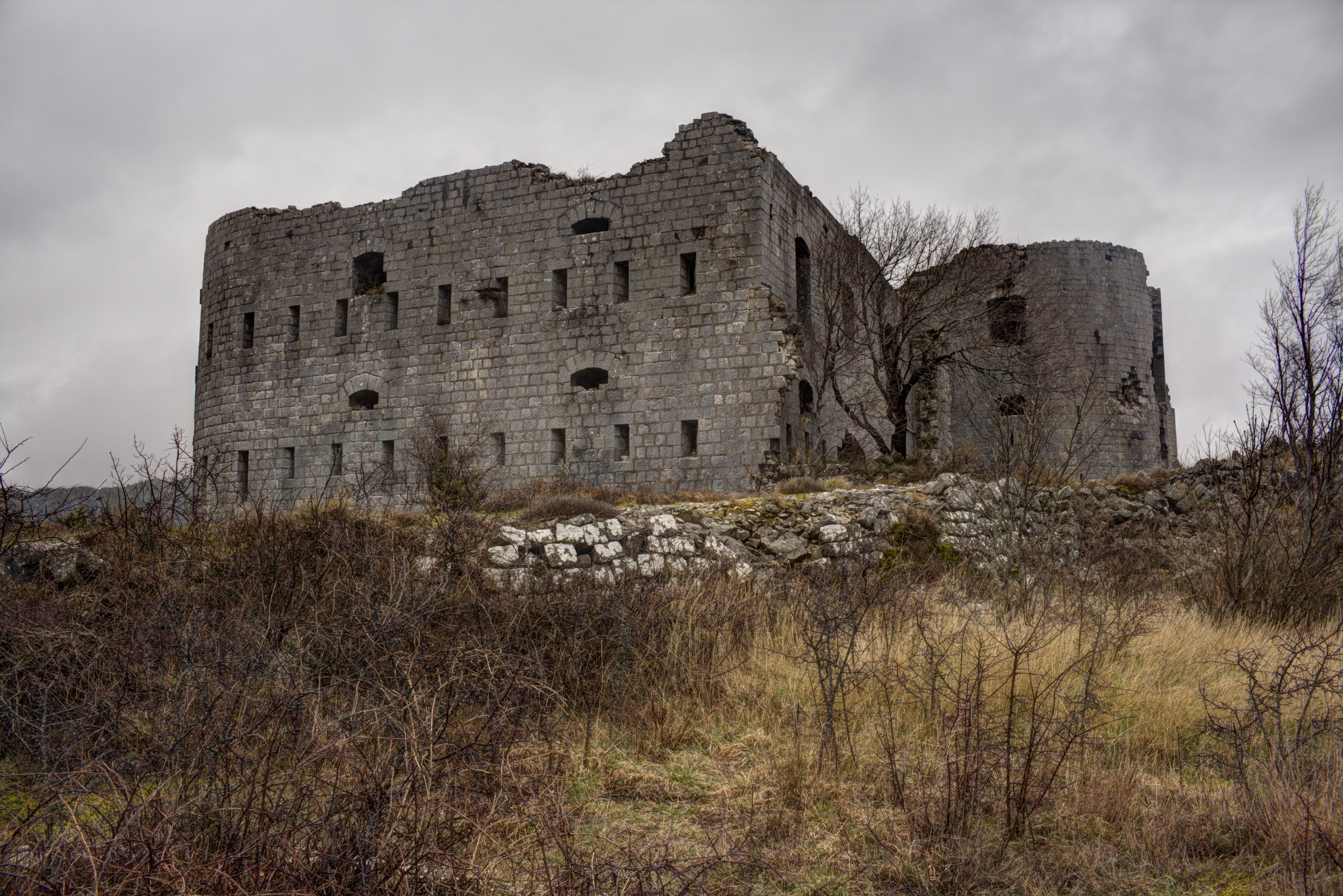
North side of Fort Kosmač

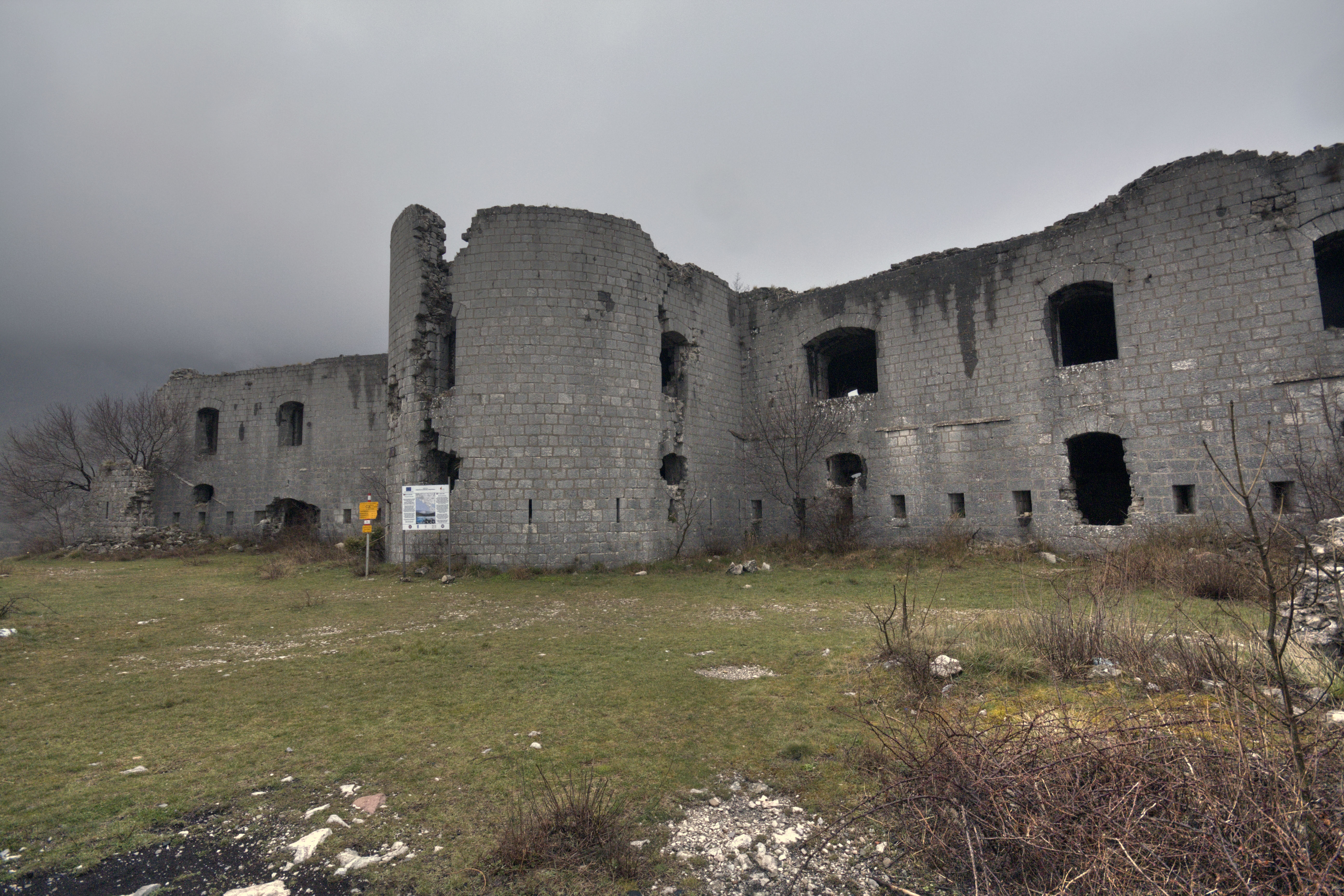
View of Fort Kosmač from the west side
Interior features of Fort Kosmač
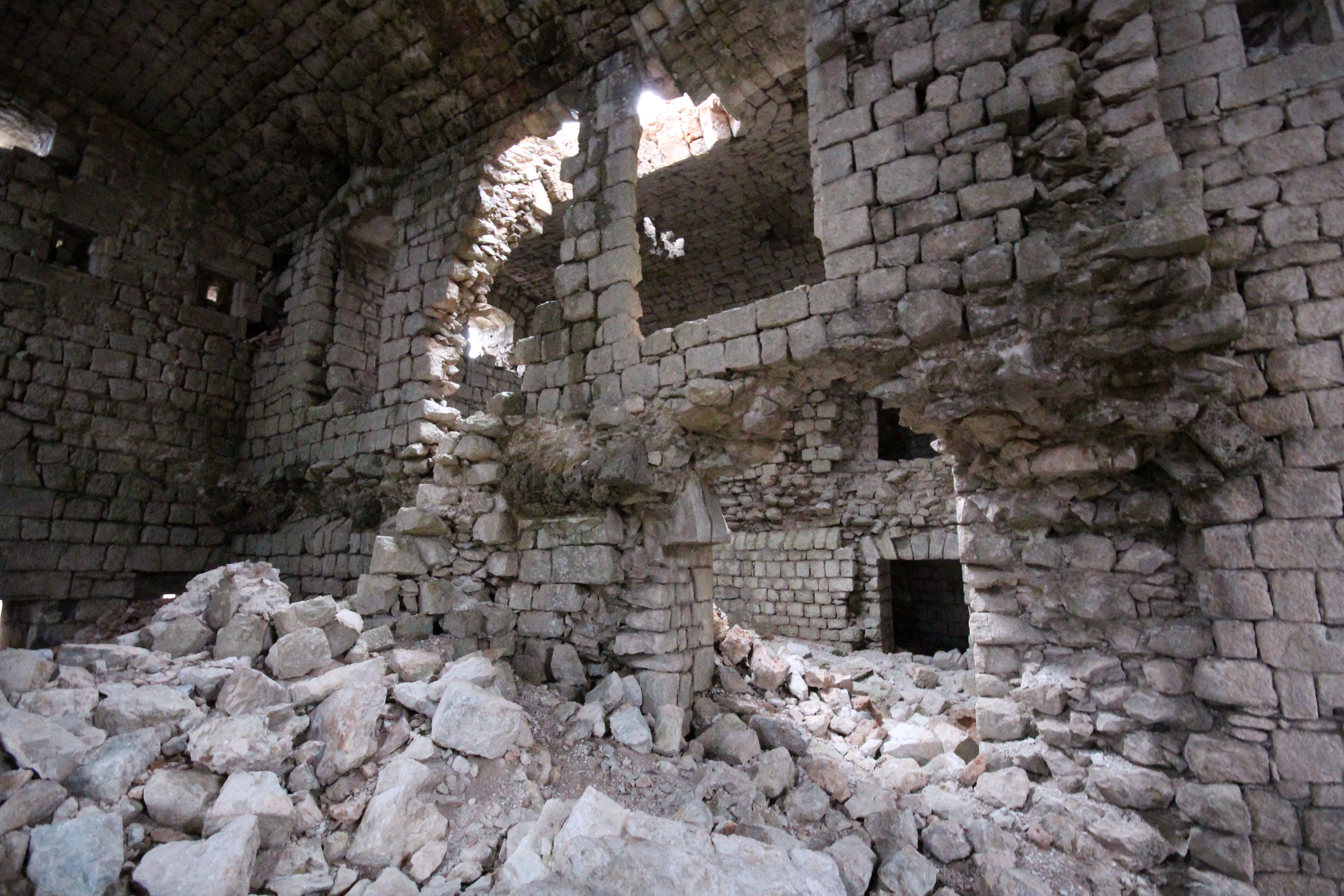
Part-collapsed interior wall of north wing extension

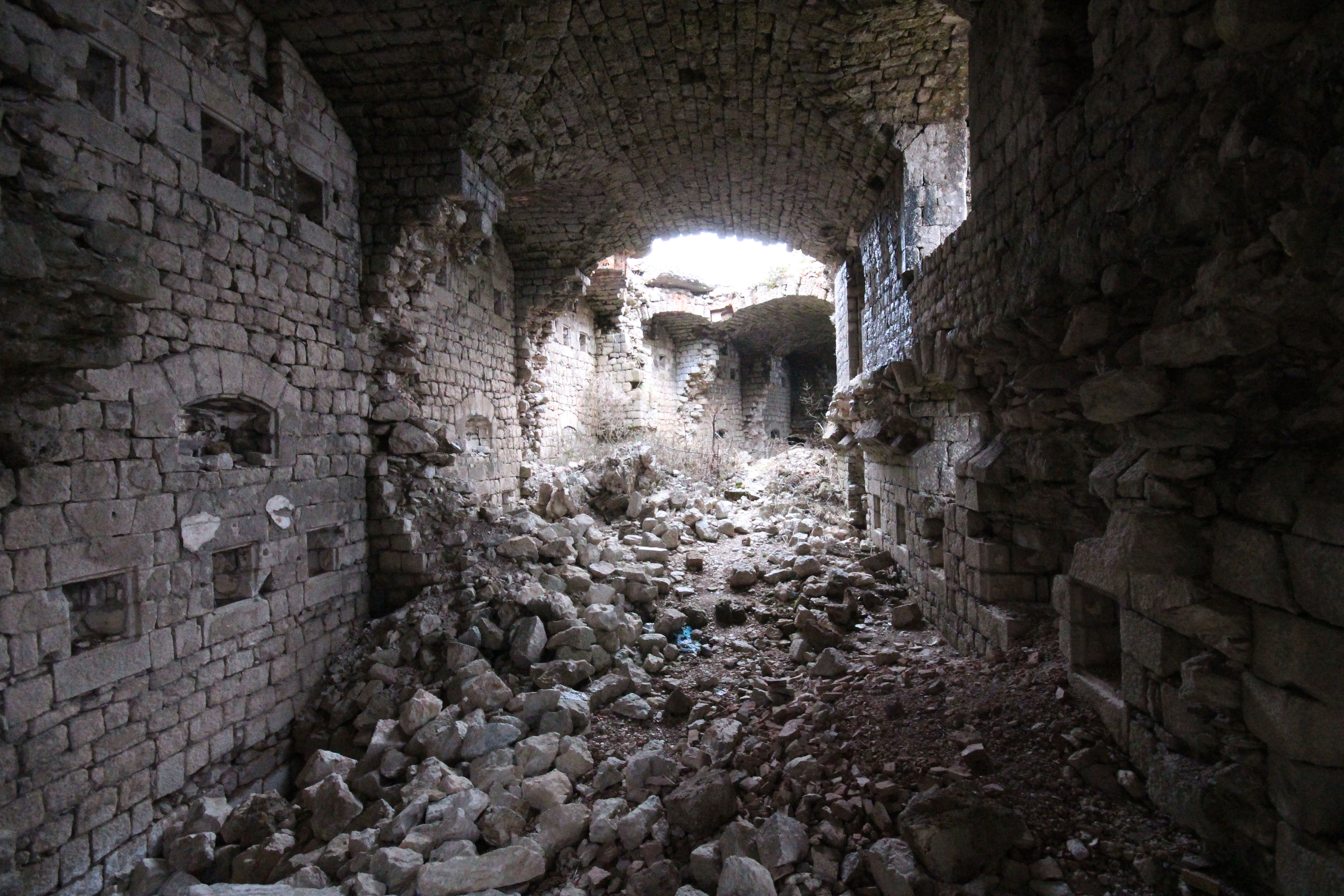
North wing of Fort Kosmač

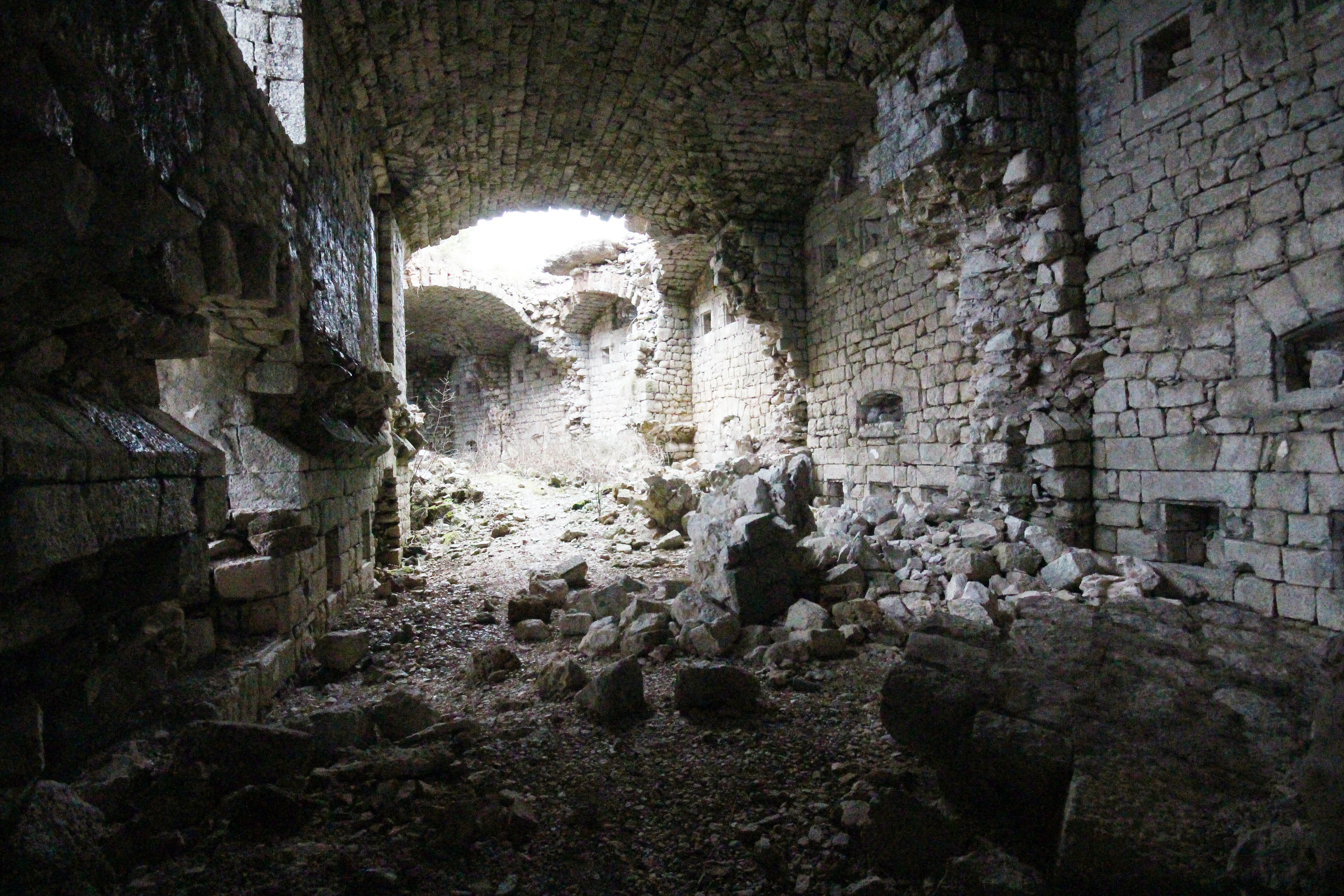
South wing of Fort Kosmač

A spacious courtyard is situated outside the fort and was once flanked by a garrison building, of which only fragments now remain. A cistern that provided the garrison's water supply is also located in this area.

The fort is readily accessible and is the site of a waypoint along the long-distance footpath, the Primorska planinarska transverzala, that leads along the Montenegrin coast. However, its ruined state means that there is a significant risk of falling masonry and visitors are advised to be extremely cautious in entering the building.

== History ==
The construction of Fort Kosmač probably began shortly after the border was demarcated in 1841; it was completed around 1850. It was garrisoned by 6 officers and 248 soldiers of various specialities and was armed with 240 mm cannons. During the Krivošije rebellion in 1869, the fort was attacked by a local clan. Its commander Friedrich Merz was shot and killed by Vukale Perov Stojanović from nearby Brajići, who subsequently became something of a local hero and is commemorated in Brajići's church. Merz's death was attributed by the press to his "own imprudence", as he had chosen to take a walk outside the fort while it was under siege from the insurgents. It was not captured and in 1875 it hosted a visit from the Emperor Franz Josef I of Austria.

The current design of Fort Kosmač dates from 1909, when it was armed with 8 mm machine guns, 90 mm KM-04 artillery guns and 150 mm cannons. It continued to be occupied by the Austro-Hungarians until the end of the First World War in 1918, when the empire collapsed and the coastal strip was united with the post-war Kingdom of Yugoslavia. It saw a further period of usage from 1941 to 1943 during the Italian occupation of the Montenegrin coast in the Second World War. Since then, the fort has been abandoned. It is now owned by the Republic Institute for the Protection of Cultural Monuments of Montenegro.

The Ministry of Culture of Montenegro describes Fort Kosmač as being "of outstanding national importance." Although the fort is now in an advanced state of ruination, proposals have been advanced to save it. This could be done either by shoring it up and arresting the progressive collapse of the building, preserving it as a ruin and a site of memory, or by restoring it and using it as accommodation (such as a youth hostel or holiday apartments) or as a cultural complex. The cost of preserving and restoring the fort was estimated in 2005 to be up to around €1.7 million. However, as of 2017, the fort continues to be neglected and its disintegration is still ongoing.
