= Lazar Mamula =

Austro-Hungarian general and governor of Dalmatia

Freiherr Lazar Mamula Lazarus von Mamula
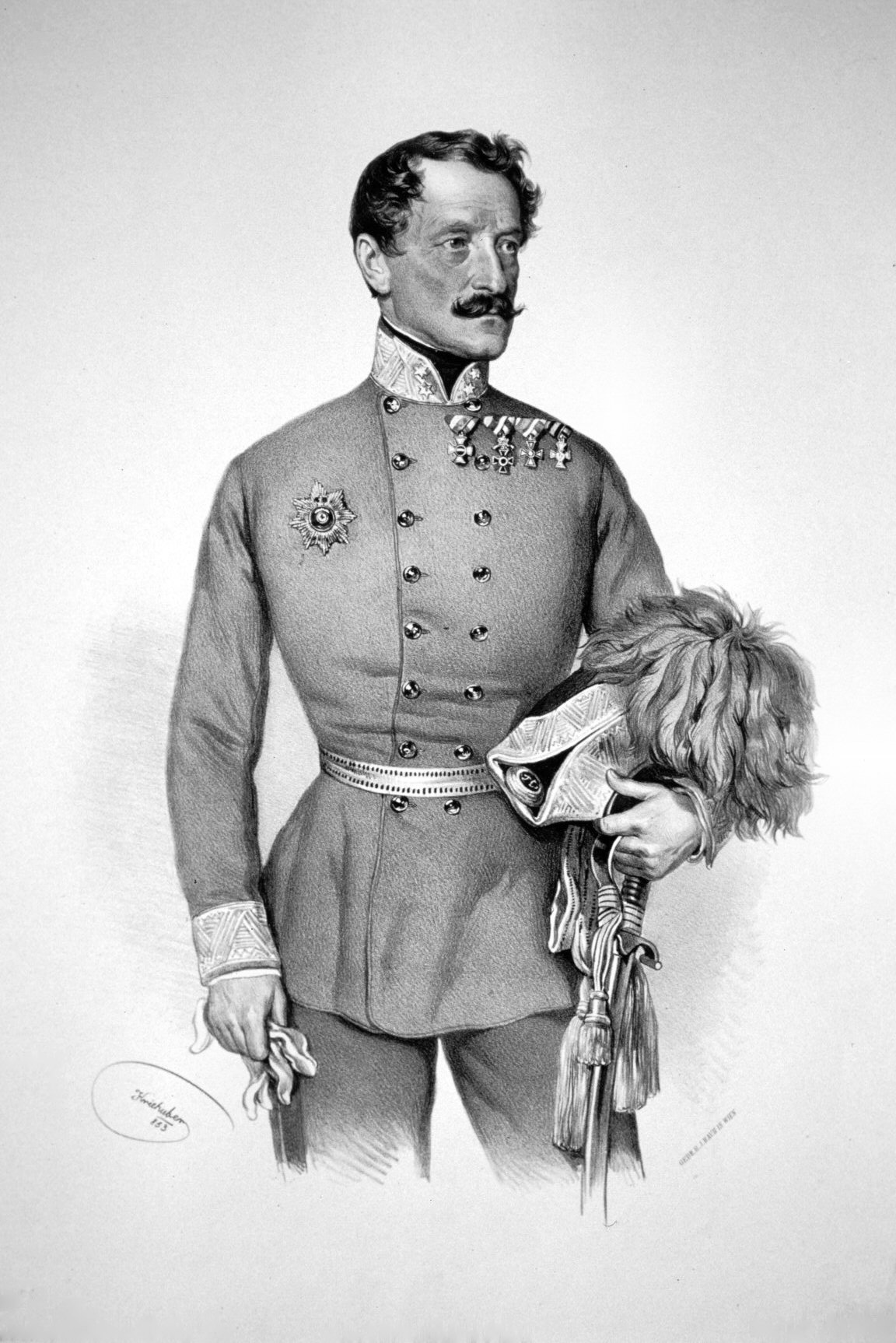
- Lazar Mamula depicted in a lithography by Josef Kriehuber

Governor of Dalmatia
- In office 1859–1865
- Preceded by: Josip Jelačić von Bužim
- Succeeded by: Franjo Filipović

Personal details
- Born: 22 May 1795 Gomirje, Austrian Empire
- Died: 12 January 1878 (aged 82) Vienna, Austria-Hungary
- Awards: Military Order of Maria Theresa; Order of Leopold

Military service
- Allegiance: Austrian Empire
- Branch/service: Imperial-Royal Army
- Years of service: 1815–1865
- Rank: Feldzeugmeister

Lazar Mamula (22 May 1795 – 12 January 1878) was an Austro-Hungarian general and governor of Dalmatia. Of Serbian ancestry, he is today often associated with the contentious Prevlaka peninsula where he constructed a fort on the slip of land overlooking the Gulf of Kotor and his active association with other Slavic leaders in the Habsburg monarchy at the time.

== Biography ==
Lazar Mamula was a Serb from Gorski Kotar, Croatia, born in 1795 in Gomirje, at the time of the Habsburg monarchy. He was actually born in the hamlet next to the monastery of Gomirje, in "Mamula", the hamlet after which his "tribe" is named.

He graduated from the Military Engineering Academy in Vienna, and from 1815 to 1831 he advanced in the Austro-Hungarian military service from cadet to captain while at the same time taking part in the military campaign in Padua, Mantua and Sicily. By 1839, he had achieved considerable success in setting up fortifications of Split on the islands of Vis and Hvar and the construction of border fortifications in Tyrol, around Comorn and in the vicinity of Innsbruck. He received the rank of major in 1841 and 1848 the rank of oberst in 1848 when he was appointed chief of the general staff in Habsburg Croatia. Under the command of Lieutenant Marshal Franz Dahlen von Orlaburg, he distinguished himself in the battles during the Hungarian Revolution of 1848 and 1849. In December 1848 he united the "Styrian-Croatian Military Corps" with which he fought in the region between the Drava and the Danube. He thus prevented the penetration of the Hungarians into Slavonia and Srem in 1849, advancing from Osijek to Petrovaradin. He repulsed the attacks on Sremska Kamenica and Sremske Karlovce. Because of these merits, the Austrian emperor awarded him the Knights Cross of the Military Order of Maria Theresa and the title of baron. Russian Tsar Nicholas I decorated Lazar with the Order of St. Anna II class. Lazar von Mamula received the rank of major general in 1850 from the Austrian Emperor and in 1853 the rank of field marshal (lieutenant marshal). Baron Mamula was appointed by Francis I in 1857 commander of Dalmatia, in 1859 governor of Dalmatia and 1865 conferred on him the rank of General of the Artillery. He retired with the same title -- Feldzeigmeister. He was the best man at the Montenegrin Prince Danilo's wedding.

He was the viceroy of the Kingdom of Dalmatia from 1859 to 1865. He was then the military and civilian governor of Dalmatia.

In the middle of the 19th century, he built a fortification on the island of Lastavica at the entrance to the Bay of Kotor. After him, this island was named Mamula.

In 1858, Baron Mamula founded the Dalmatian Invalids Foundation with an initial capital of 20,000 florins. In 1867, Baron Mamula made several donations to the Serbian Orthodox Church of St. George in Ogulin. The bells were donated to the church by Emperor Francis Joseph I himself, while the iconostasis was donated to the church by Baron Mamula.

Baron Mamula died in Vienna on 12 January 1878.

General Bogdan Mamula and Later Fleet Admiral Branko Mamula are a descendant of his.

== Ranks ==
- Kadett-feldwebel (cadet-sergeant) awarded in 1815,
- Hauptmann (captain) awarded in 1831,
- Major (major) awarded in 1841,
- Oberst (Colonel) awarded in 1848,
- Major General (Major General) awarded in 1850,
- Feldmarschalleutnant (sub-marshal) awarded in 1853,
- Feldzeugmeister (artillery general) awarded in 1865.

== Medals ==
=== Austrian Empire ===
- Knight's Cross of the Military Order of Maria Theresa (Ritter des Militär Maria Theresien Ordens)
- Knight's Cross of the Order of Leopold (Austria) (Ritterkreuz des Österreichisch-kaiserlicher Leopold-Orden)

=== Russian Empire ===
- Order of St. Anna II class (Orden Svjatoi Anny, II)
