= Mamula =

Island in Montenegro

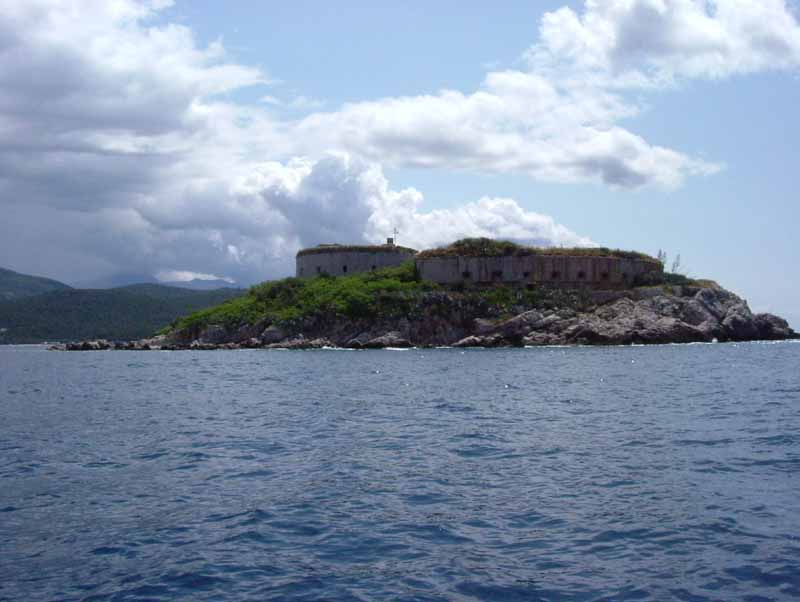
- Mamula Island

- Location within Montenegro
- Interactive map of Mamula

Geography
- Location: Adriatic Sea
- Coordinates: 42°23′43″N 18°33′30″E

Administration
- Montenegro
- Municipality: Herceg Novi

Demographics
- Population: 0

Mamula (Montenegrin: Мамула), also known colloquially as Lastavica, is an uninhabited islet in the Adriatic Sea, within the southwestern Montenegrin municipality of Herceg Novi.

Mamula is located between Prevlaka and Luštica peninsulas at the entrance to the Bay of Kotor. This small islet is of circular shape, and is 200m in diameter. It is 3.4 nautical miles (6.3 km) away from Herceg Novi.

== History ==
During the period of the Venetian Republic rule, the island was known as Rondina.

The island has a fort, built in 1853 by Austro-Hungarian general Lazar Mamula. The fort takes up about 90% of the island's surface area. Along with the fortification on Prevlaka's Cape Oštro as well as Arza fortification on Luštica's Cape Arza, both of which were erected at the same time also on suggestion by general Lazar Mamula, fort Mamula was part of the Austro-Hungarian Army's contingency plans of preventing the enemy entrance into the Bay of Kotor.

=== Concentration camp in World War II ===
During World War II, from 30 May 1942 onwards, the fascist forces of Benito Mussolini's Kingdom of Italy converted the Mamula fort into a concentration camp. The concentration camp was known for torture and cruelty to prisoners. Most of the camp's prisoners came from the neighboring area.

=== Luxury resort redevelopment ===
In early January 2016 the government of Montenegro, over the objections of those who were once imprisoned on the island, approved a plan to convert the site of this former concentration camp into a luxury beach resort by Switzerland-based Orascom Development Holding AG under a 49-year lease deal. Former United Nations Secretary General Boutros Boutros-Ghali had previously written the Montenegrin Parliament expressing surprise that the "only solution for preserving and using the fort is a mere business arrangement and privatisation agreement." Since 2023 it is a completed resort.

== In popular culture ==
The 1959 Yugoslav movie Campo Mamula starring Ljuba Tadić, Pavle Vuisić, and Dragan Laković, produced by Avala Film and directed by Velimir Stojanović, depicts and dramatizes the World War II events on the island that was converted into a concentration camp during this period.

In autumn 2013, the Serbian fantasy drama-thriller Mamula was announced. Later retitled Killer Mermaid for overseas release, it was shot on the island and incorporates its history, featuring an ex-German soldier living on the island and killing people to feed to a mermaid.

Serbian thrash metal band Quasarborn has a song titled "Mamula" that appears on their second full-length album "A Pill Hard to Swallow".
