= Fort Trašte =

Austro-Hungarian fortification in Montenegro

- Tvrđava Trašte / Werk Traste
- close to Tivat, Montenegro
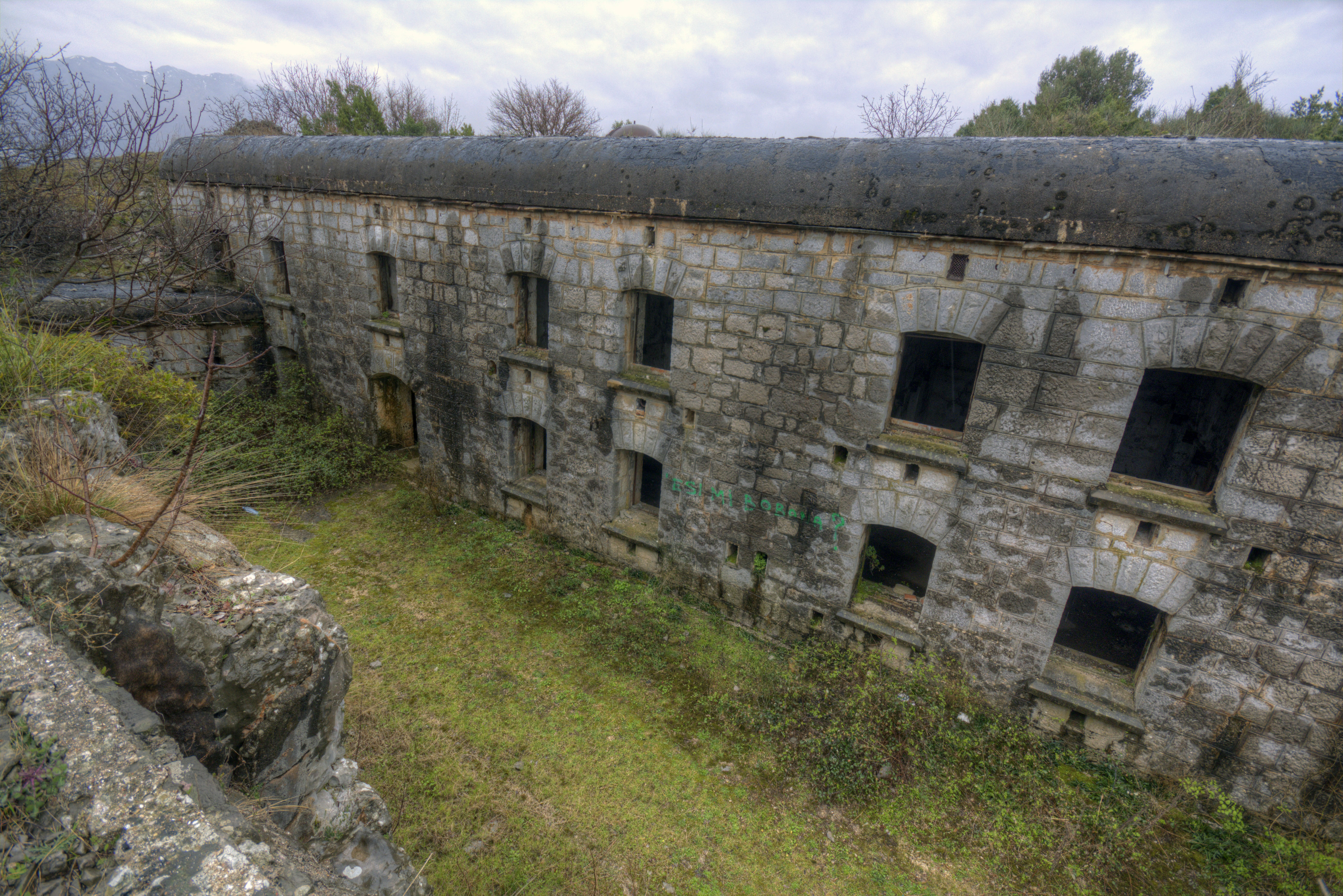
- Entrance to the fort

Site information
- Type: Fortification
- Controlled by: Montenegro
- Condition: Abandoned

Location
- Location within Montenegro
- Coordinates: 42.371694°N 18.713553°E

Site history
- Built: 1907–09 (current structure)
- Built by: Austro-Hungarian Empire
- In use: 1907–1918
- Materials: Concrete, limestone
- Battles/wars: First World War

Garrison information
- Garrison: 5 officers & 143 men (wartime numbers)

Fort Trašte (Montenegrin: Tvrđava Trašte/Тврђава Траште, German: Werk Traste) is a fortification built by the Austro-Hungarian Empire near Tivat in Montenegro. Built on a hill between 1907 and 1909, it overlooks the Bay of Trašte on one side and the plain of Tivatsko polje on the other. The fort was intended to secure the bay against possible landings from the sea. It was bombarded during World War I but sustained little damage. The collapse of the empire in 1918 led to the abandonment of the fort. It is now derelict but is still in fairly good condition externally, with its rotating gun cupolas still in situ.

== Background ==
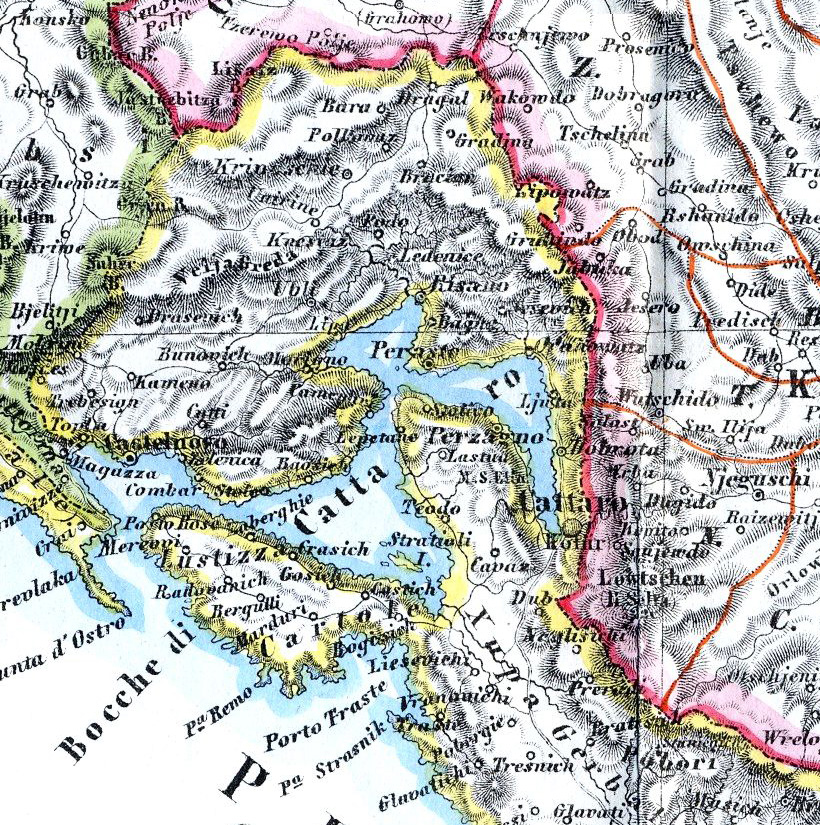
Map of the Bay of Kotor in 1862. Fort Trašte is just west of "Liesevichi" (Leševiči) near the bottom of the map

The southernmost tip of the Austro-Hungarian Empire included the area of the Bay of Kotor, which was used by the empire as a major naval base centred on the town of Kotor (known then as Cattaro). The hinterland behind the bay was controlled by the independent principality (later kingdom) of Montenegro, which controlled the mountains to the east of Kotor.

To the south-west of Kotor is the flat plain of Tivatsko polje, on which Tivat Airport now stands, with a range of low hills lying between the plain and the sea. The fort is situated on the hill of Grabovac overlooking the Bay of Trašte on one side and Tivatsko polje on the other. The main road through the region, now the Adriatic Highway, was of vital strategic importance to the Austro-Hungarians as it connected their southernmost possessions – Budva and the surrounding area – with the naval base at Kotor and the port at Tivat. At the start of the 20th century, its defences comprised a series of temporary fortifications established up to 40 years previously.

Montenegro's 1905 acquisition of powerful new long-ranged artillery guns, which put the entire coastal strip within range of shellfire, made the existing fortifications obsolete. This prompted the Austrians to set up in 1906 a "Commission to Secure the Naval Base of Cattaro". It was decided to establish a powerful new fortress on Grabovac hill which would be a combined artillery fort and a forward infantry stronghold. It would form part of an integrated defence system to counter the Montenegrin batteries on Mount Lovćen, work with the Škaljari Battery, Fort Vrmac and Fort Gorazda to secure the Župa valley, and support the coastal battery at Radisevice in the event of a seaborne attack.

== Description ==
The fort consists of two structures located at an altitude of 248 m (814 ft) at the summit of Grabovac hill – Fort Trašte itself and the associated infantry stronghold of Stützpunkt Grabovac. The two were originally surrounded by a permanent layer of barbed wire defences and are linked by a postern tunnel, allowing troops to pass between them without being exposed to enemy fire. It is located in heavily vegetated terrain and can be reached by following a rough track for about 650 m (2,130 ft) from the paved road between the villages of Leševiči and Bigovo. A few hundred metres from the main fortress are the ruins of a barracks and various other buildings, of which little now remains. A small infantry position stands in front of the fort to protect its northerly approaches. The entrance to the two-storey fort is reached via a deep cutting in the rock of the hillside, which is protected by a single caponier at right angles to the entrance. The caponier's rifle ports still have their mountings in place.

Although the exterior is intact, the interior has undergone a substantial collapse or demolition of the first-floor ceiling, though the interior walls are still standing. A stone staircase provides limited access to what is left of the first floor. The fort has a roughly L-shaped layout, with troop accommodation on the east–west leg of the L (a huge oven can still be seen in one of the first-floor rooms) and gun turrets on the north–south leg. There are four turrets positioned in a line with their Škoda-built rotating steel gun turrets still in situ. Associated ammunition storage rooms are located nearby. A single observation turret, also with its cupola still present, is located at the southern end of the L.

Behind the main part of Fort Trašte and another observation turret (lacking its cupola) a portal gives access to the postern tunnel that leads to Stützpunkt Grabovac. The almost perfectly preserved tunnel runs underground for around 200 m (660 ft) and exits at the infantry position to the south of the fort.

Exterior features of Fort Trašte
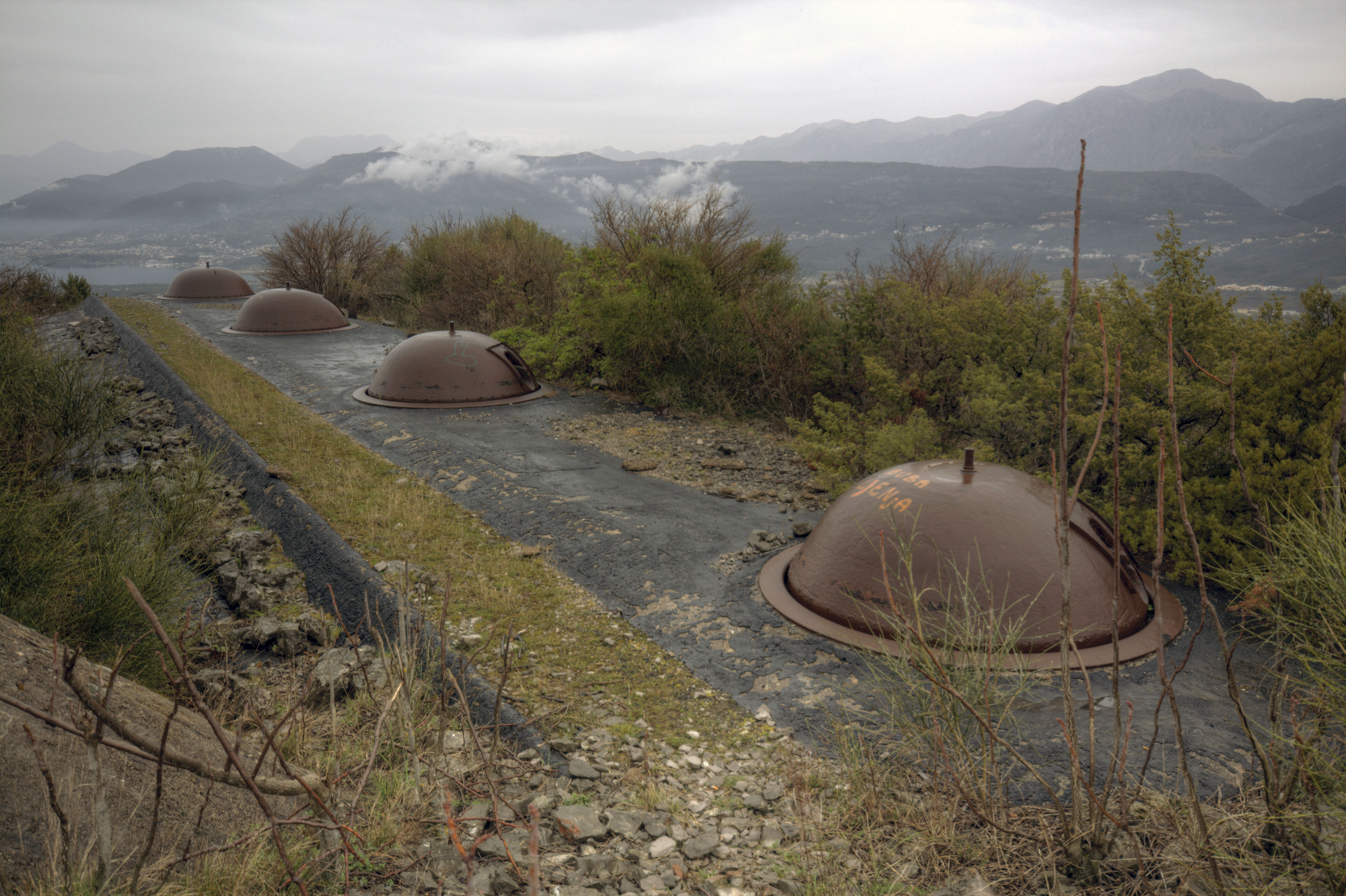
Row of four rotating turrets on the fort's roof

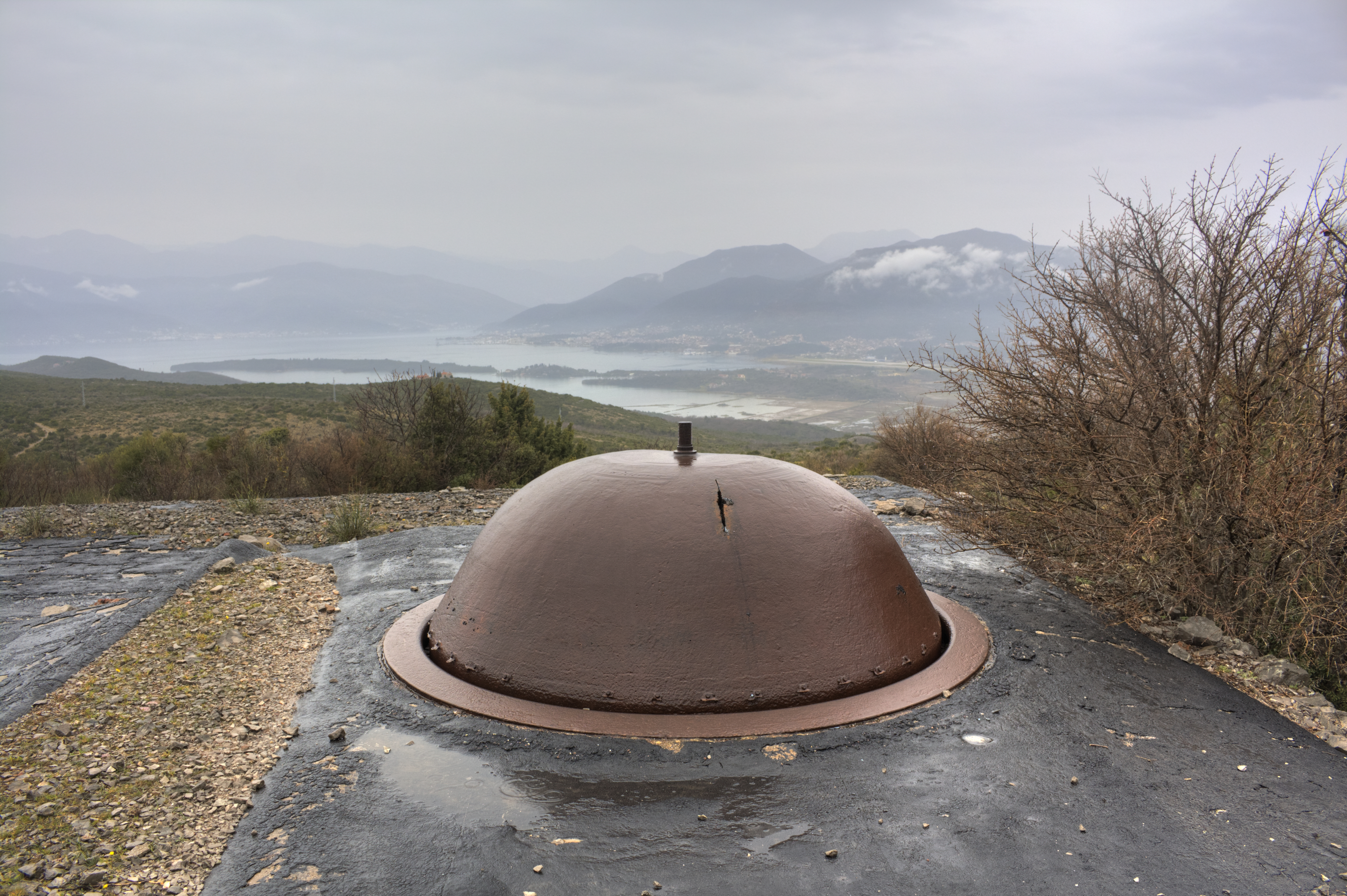
Škoda gun turret with view over Tivatsko polje

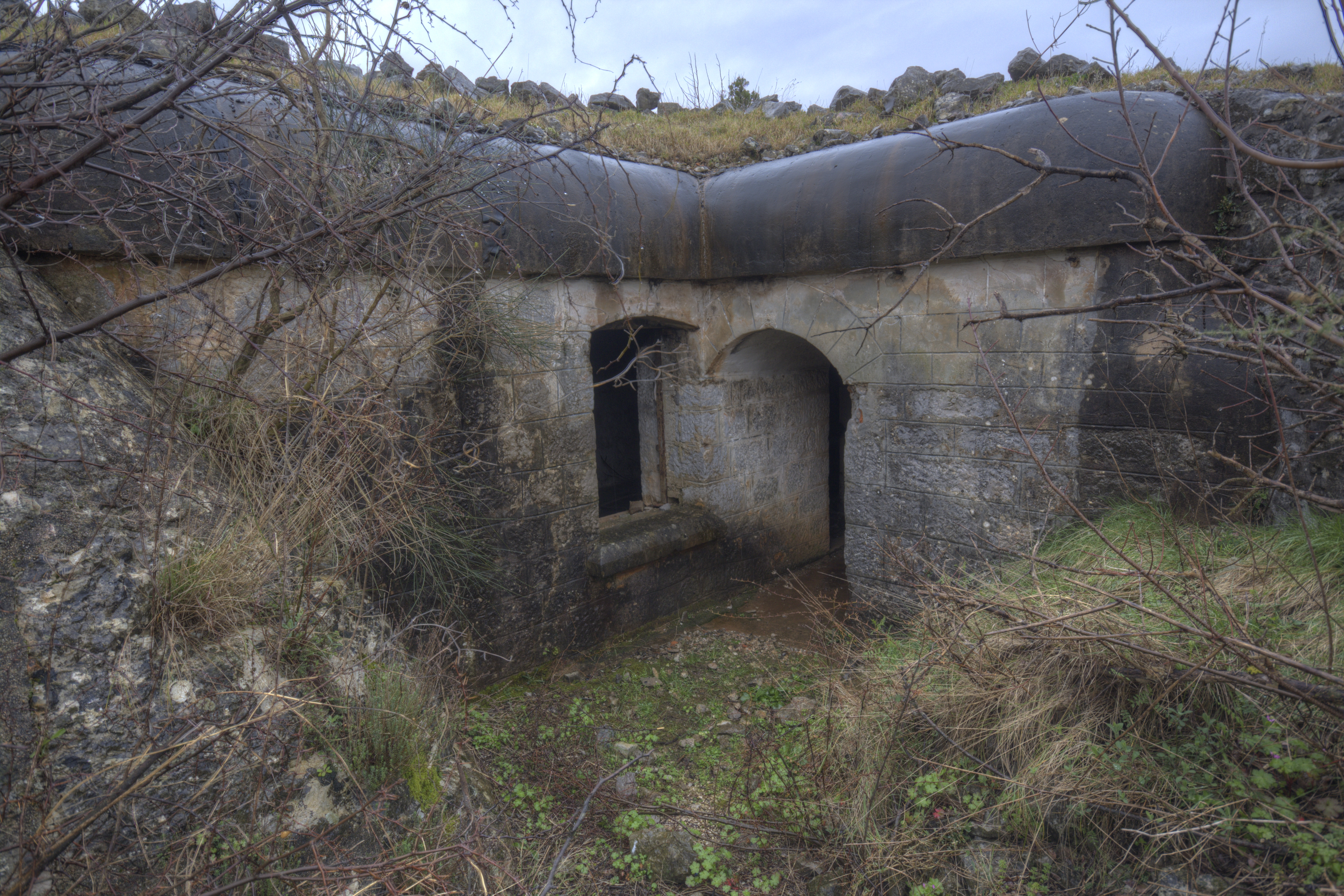
Entrance to Stützpunkt Grabovac at the fort's rear

== History ==
Only two years after Fort Trašte was completed in 1909, proposals were advanced that it should be demolished and a new and even stronger fortress should be built on the Lustiča peninsula a few kilometers to the north. However, the outbreak of the Balkan Wars in 1912 meant that the discussions were suspended. In 1914, the fort came under artillery bombardment from Montenegrin forces on Mount Lovćen. The attacks caused little damage due to the small calibre of the guns used.

Interior features of Fort Trašte
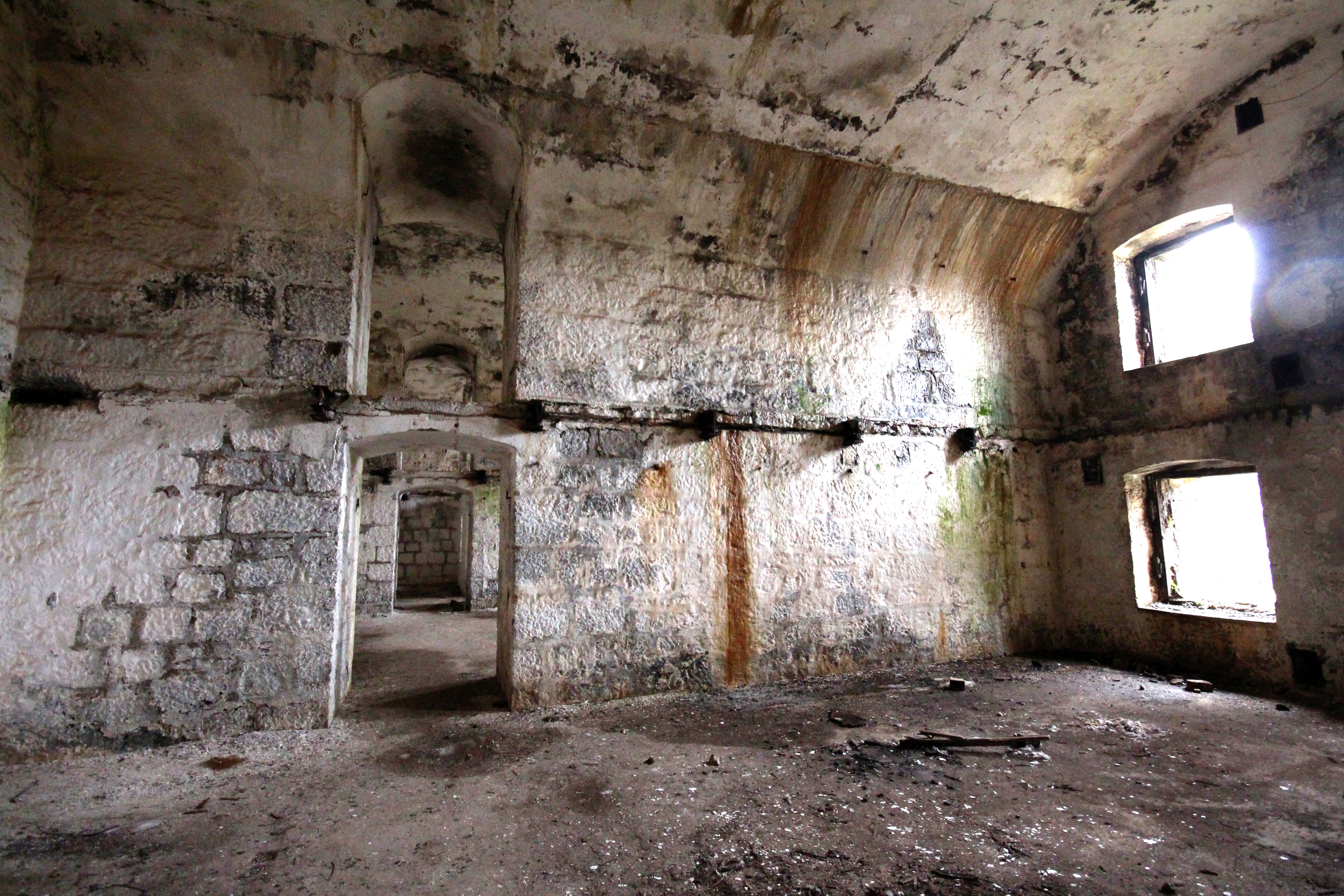
One of the troop accommodation rooms

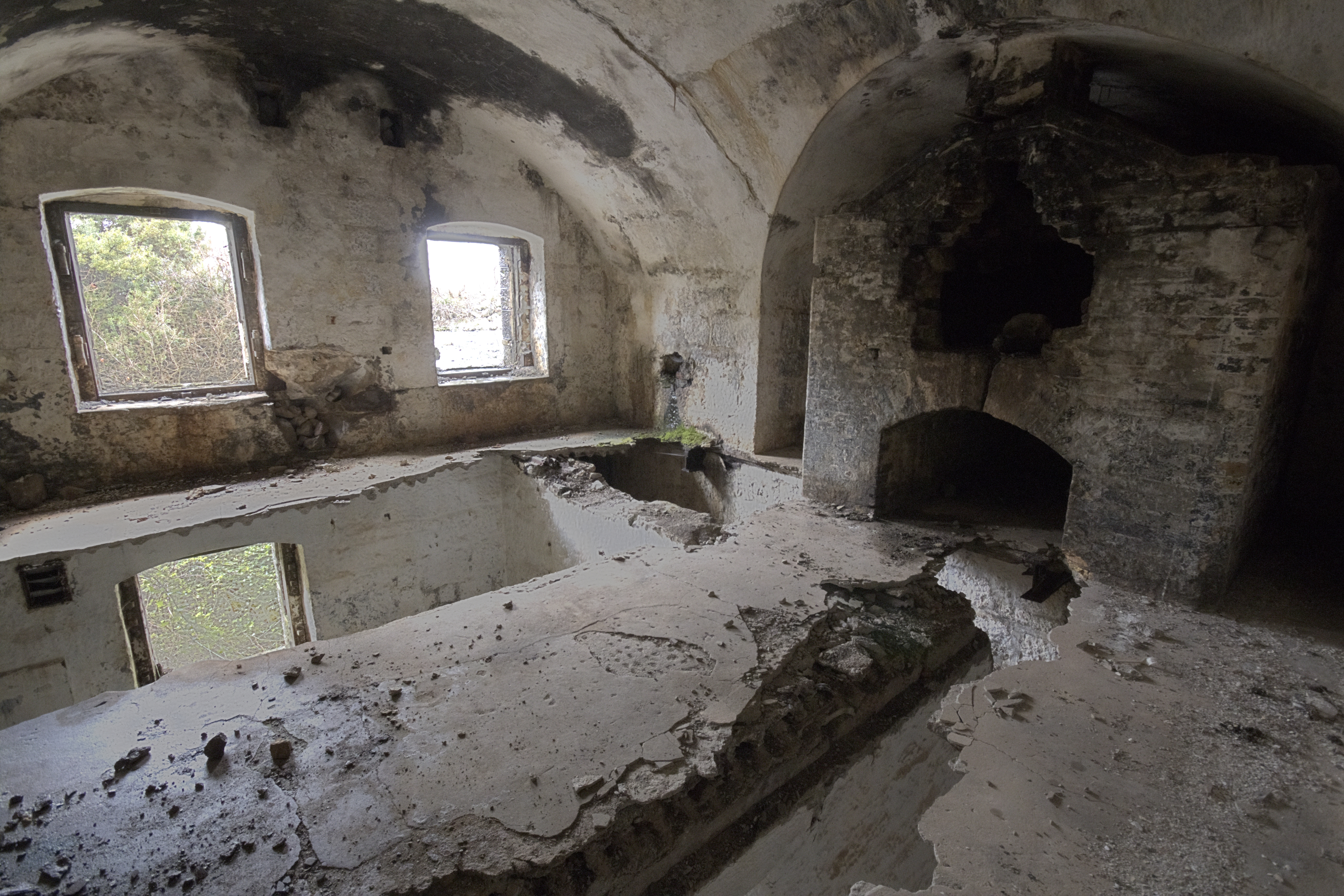
Partly collapsed room with a baker's oven

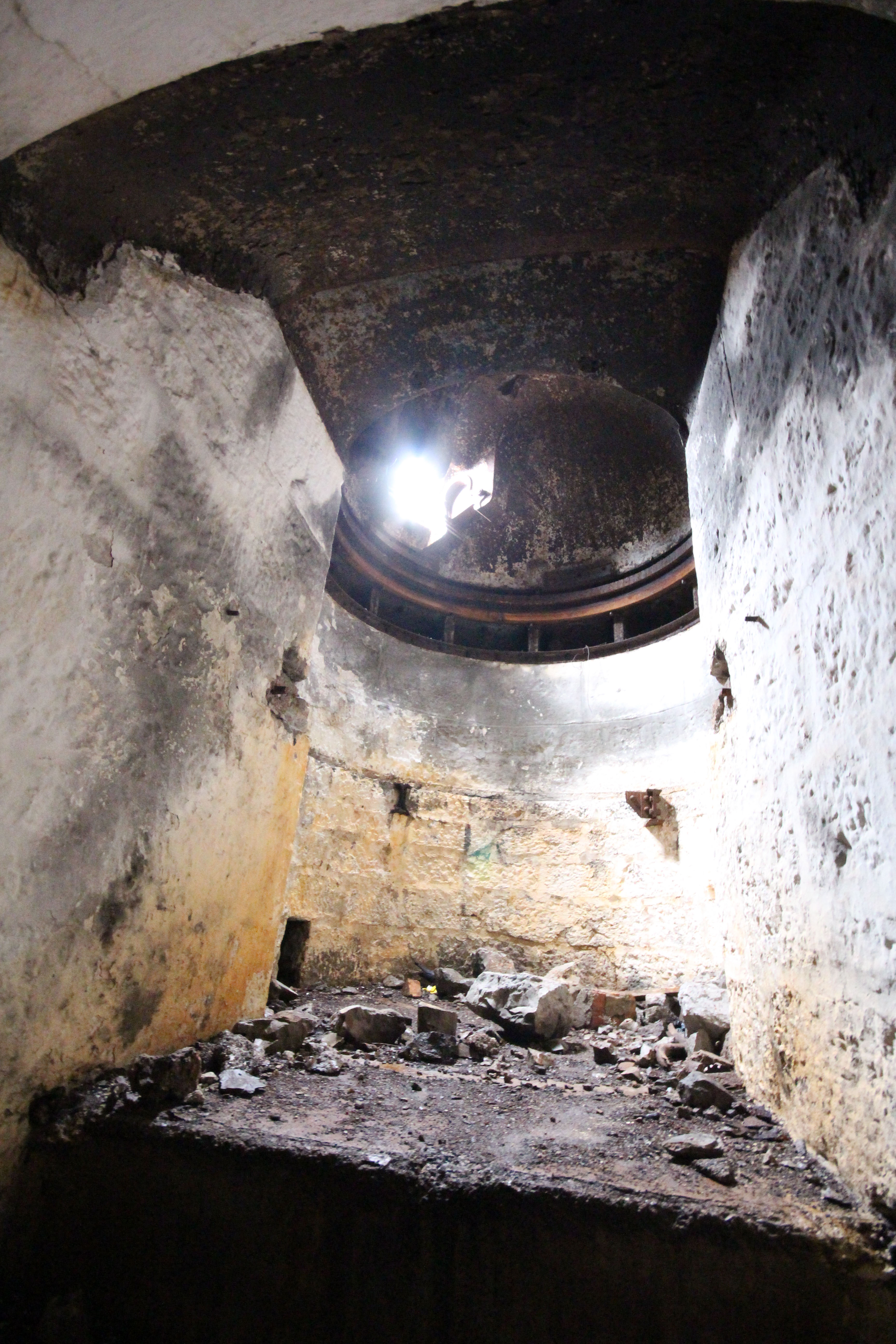
Interior of one of the gun turrets

During the war, the fort was garrisoned by five officers and 143 men. Its primary armament was four 10-cm PH M06 howitzers housed in the Škoda turrets. For close defence, it had two 8 mm M4 machine guns and three gun carriages. After the collapse of the Austro-Hungarian Empire at the end of the First World War, the fort was abandoned and the territory it controlled became part of the newly established state of Yugoslavia.
