= Fort Vrmac =

Austro-Hungarian fortification in Montenegro

- Tvrđava Vrmac / Werk Vermac
- near Tivat, Montenegro
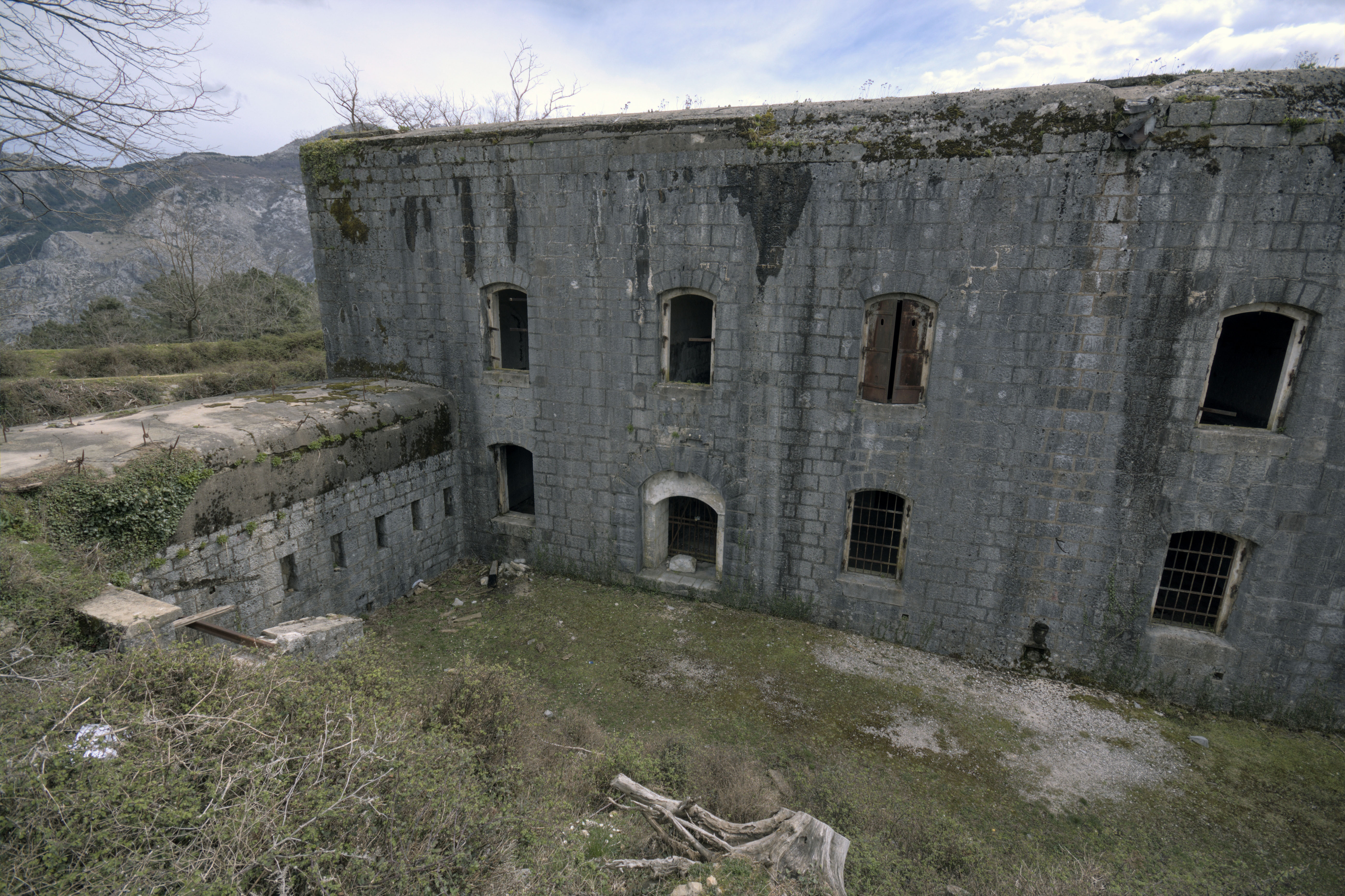
- View of the entrance and north caponier of Fort Vrmac

Site information
- Type: Fortification
- Controlled by: Montenegro
- Condition: Abandoned

Location
- Location within Montenegro
- Coordinates: 42.421053°N 18.749236°E
- Height: 480 m

Site history
- Built: 1860 (first fortress), 1894–7 (current structure)
- Built by: Austro-Hungarian Empire
- In use: 1860–1918, 1918–?
- Materials: Concrete, limestone
- Battles/wars: First World War

Garrison information
- Garrison: 5 officers & 177 men (wartime numbers)

Fort Vrmac (Montenegrin: Tvrđava Vrmac/Тврђава Врмац, German: Werk Vermac) is a former fortification of the Austro-Hungarian Empire located on the southern end of the Vrmac ridge near Tivat in Montenegro. Established in 1860, the present structure was built between 1894 and 1897, and saw action during the First World War, when it was heavily bombarded by the Montenegrins. It was repaired and disarmed before the end of the war and was abandoned after a period of occupation by Yugoslav troops. Today it is one of the best preserved Austro-Hungarian fortifications in the Bay of Kotor area.

== Background ==
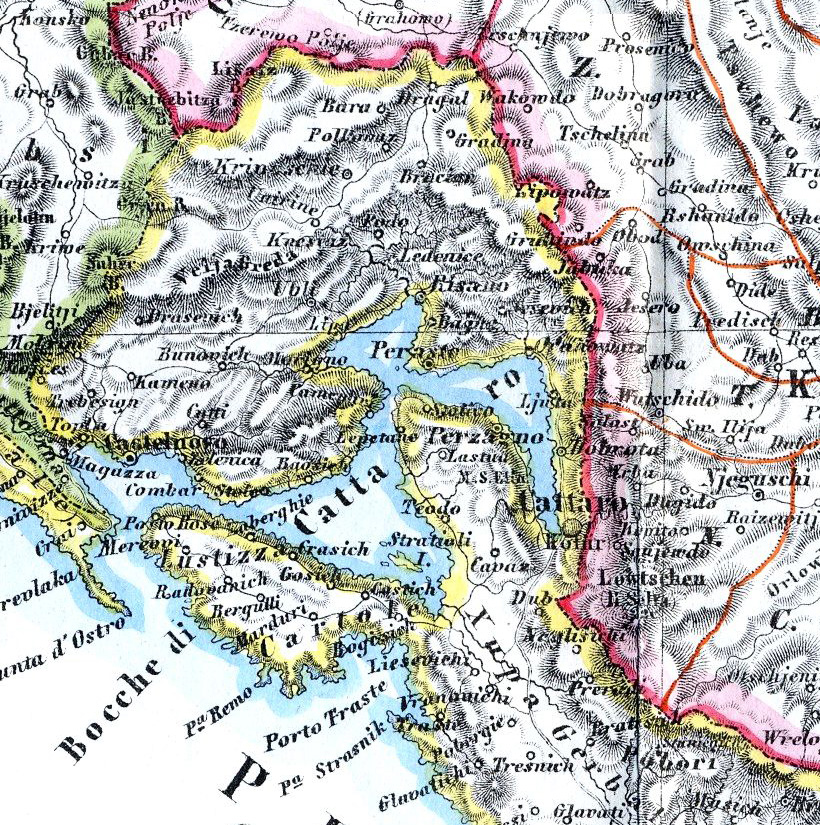
Map of the Bay of Kotor in 1862

The southernmost tip of the Austro-Hungarian Empire included the area of the Bay of Kotor, which was used by the empire as a major naval base centred on the town of Kotor (known then as Cattaro). The hinterland behind the bay was controlled by the independent principality (later kingdom) of Montenegro, which controlled the mountains to the east of Kotor.

The Austro-Hungarians faced significant problems in holding on to the territory, as the Montenegrins and their Russian allies aspired to take control of the bay and Austrian rule was not universally accepted by the area's inhabitants. Two serious rebellions were mounted by the powerful Krivošije clan who lived on the eastern flanks of Mount Orjen above Risan. In 1869 the clan defeated an Austro-Hungarian force sent to quell their rebellion, but Austrian control was reimposed in 1882. The Austrians responded to the uprising by building a series of fortifications around the Bay of Kotor and at strategic points further inland, and strengthening the existing fort, including the one at Vrmac.

== Location ==
Fort Vrmac is situated on Vrmac, a limestone ridge that rises to 785 metres (2,575 ft) and divides the inner and outer part of the Bay of Kotor. It overlooks Kotor to the east, the Troica pass leading to Kotor to the south, and the Župa valley to the west. The fort is reached via a military road built by the Austro-Hungarians that runs over the top of the ridge from Troica to Gornja Lastva in Tivat municipality, or alternatively via a winding path that leads up the mountainside from Muo, a suburb of Kotor. Its position was chosen to enable it to support the outlying Fort Gorazda on the other side of the Troica pass and the Škaljari Battery to the south. From 1909, it was also supported by Fort Trašte located on the hills above the plain of Tivatsko polje to the west. The location is highly strategic but was vulnerable to artillery attack from the heights of Mount Lovćen on the other side of the Bay of Kotor.

An Austrian publication of 1870 commented that the fortification's "central position ensures the possession of the whole Bocche [Bay of Kotor]. There are accommodation and magazine buildings. Cisterns, depots, hospitals, defensive barracks and finally fortifications have been created, which make this position a truly impregnable rock castle..." However, it noted frankly that Austrian control of the Bay of Kotor was tenuous: "One shouldn't deceive oneself about the claim to control of the whole Bocche! Surrounded by an unreliable population that unabashedly gravitates toward Montenegro, our troops in the Bocche will be confined to fortified places and the area that their cannons control the moment Russian ships appear in the Adriatic Sea."

== Description ==
The fort comprises a heavily reinforced stone and concrete structure situated within a ditch, defended by three caponiers. There is a single entrance on the north side, accessed from the ditch and protected by a caponier. The design is similar to that of the "Vogl period" fortresses in South Tyrol, with an irregular pentagonal shape constructed on two levels. The main guns were housed in armoured casemates, with howitzers and observation turrets in steel cupolas made by Škoda Works in Plzeň.

The roof of the fort is a 1.5 m (4.9 ft) thick slab of concrete that was installed in 1906–7 following improvements to Montenegrin artillery capabilities. The barracks rooms are located on the ground and first floors on the north side while the casemates are situated on the other sides of the fort, facing towards what was then potentially hostile territory. A separate structure a short distance to the north of the fort was used as an ammunition magazine.

Exterior features of Fort Vrmac
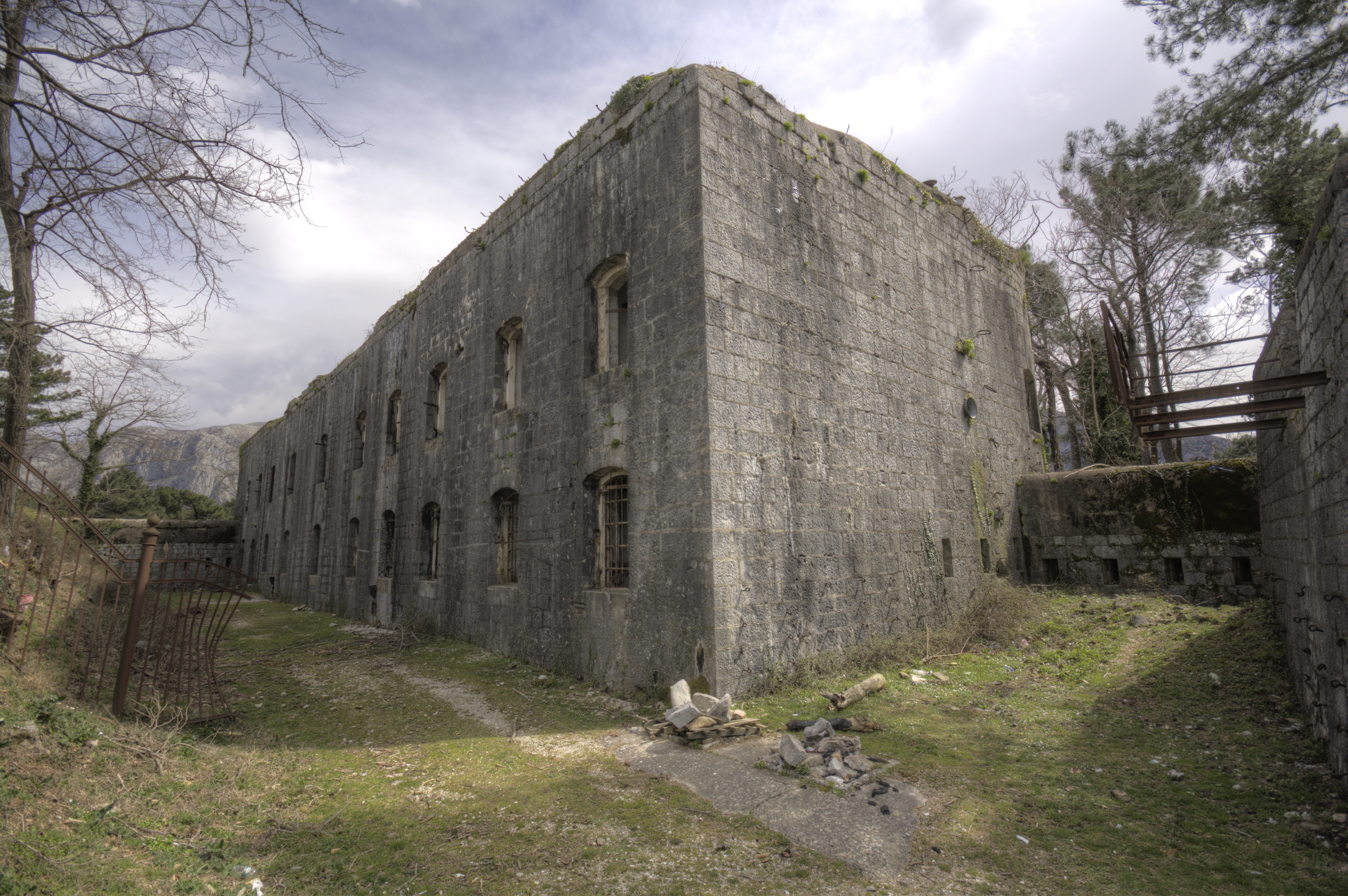
Defensive ditch and north side of Fort Vrmac

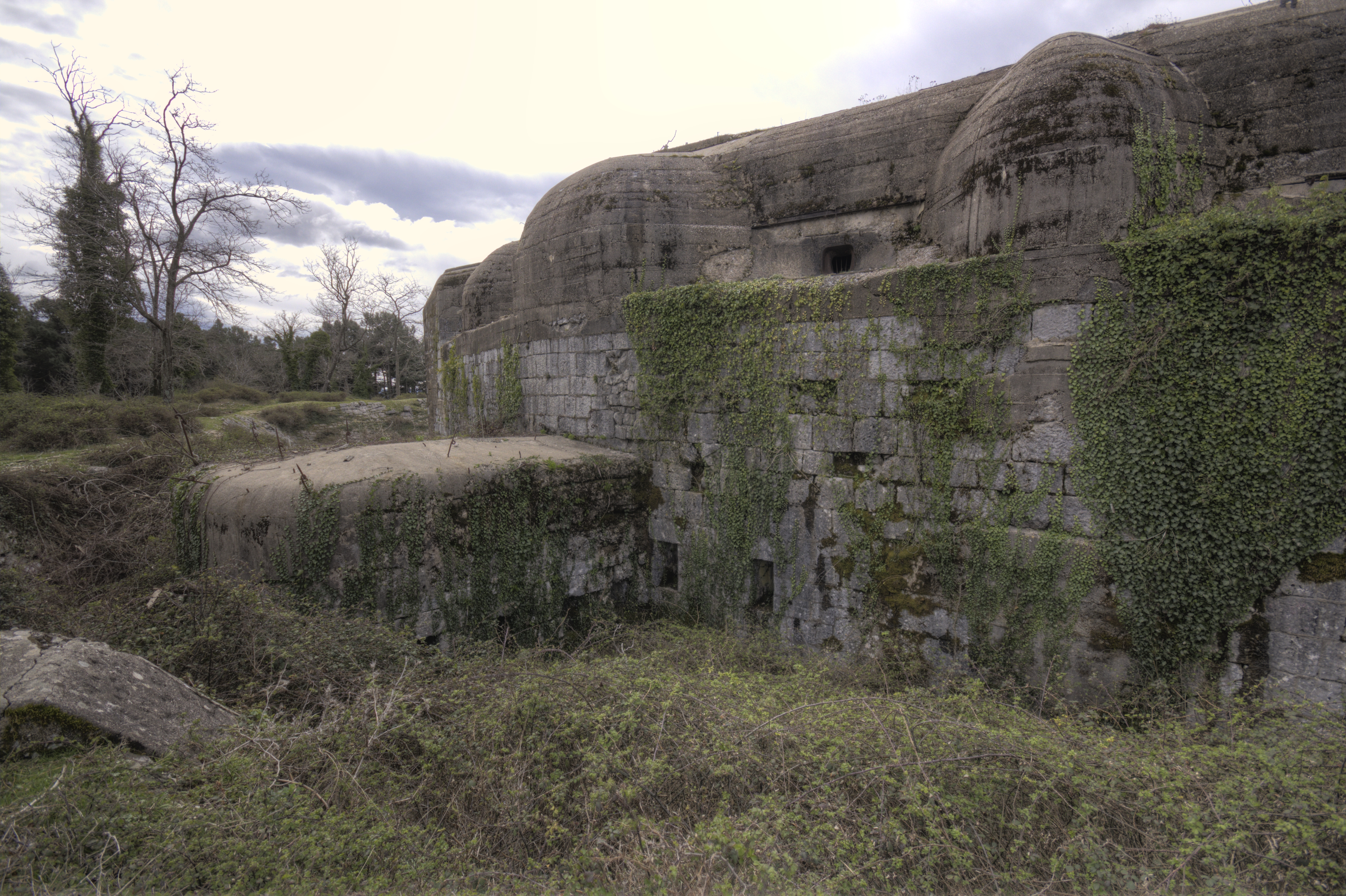
View of gun emplacements on the fort's east side

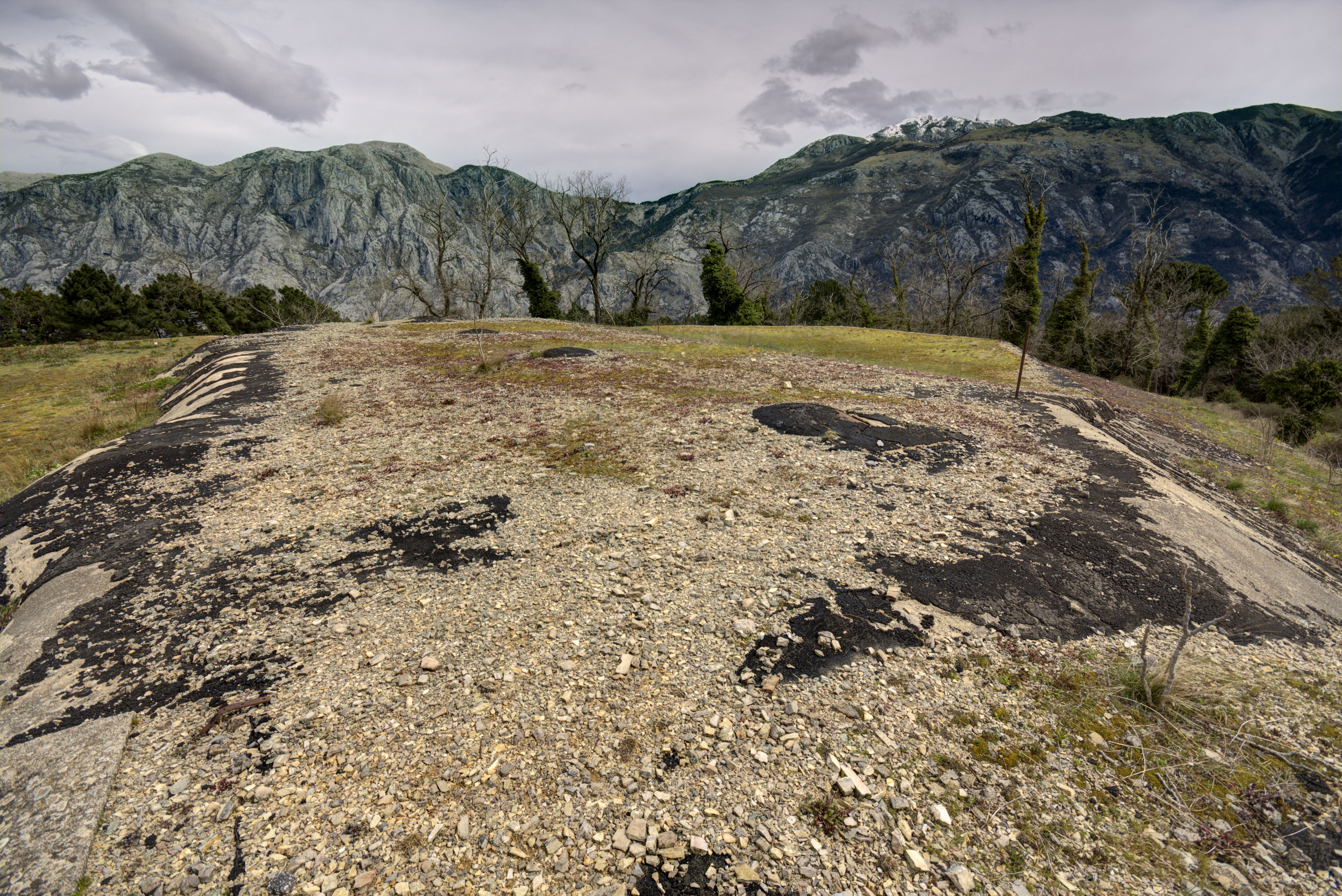
View over the bitumen-covered concrete roof

== History ==
A fort was built on Vrmac as early as 1860, but it played only a minor part in the military actions of 1869 and 1882. The Krivošije rebellions prompted a decision by the Austro-Hungarian Reichsbefestigungskommission (State Fortification Commission) to replace it with a more advanced fortress. Constructed between 1894 and 1897, it was armed with eight 12 cm (4.7 in) minimum charter M80/85 mortars and four 10 cm (3.9 in) PH M05 guns, plus 12 gun carriages. It was initially designed to be able to accommodate four field guns erected on the roof, to be used for close defence. This unusual feature was removed in the 1906-7 strengthening of the fortress, following which it was redesignated as being purely for long-ranged artillery.

Interior features of Fort Vrmac
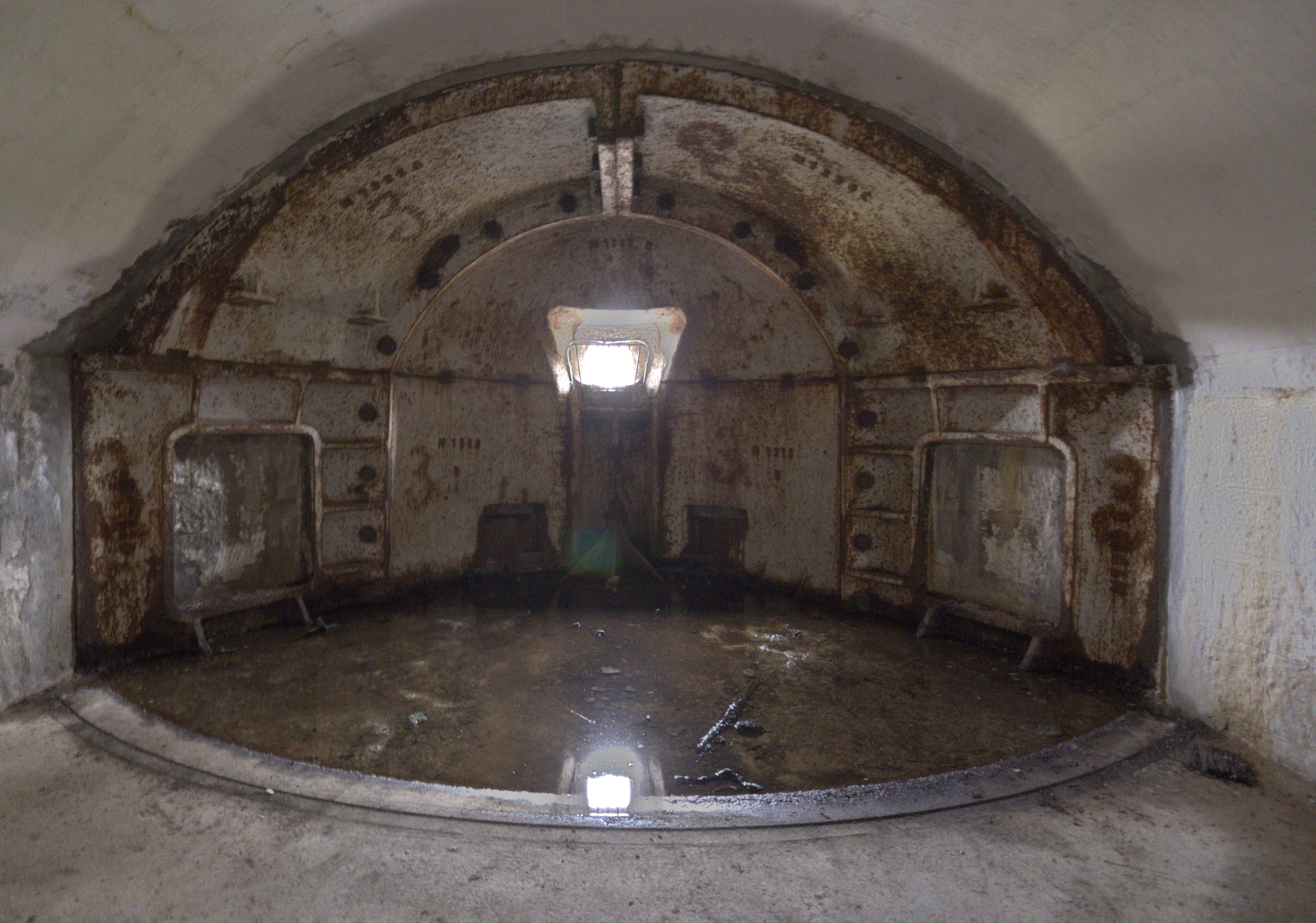
One of the Škoda-made casemates, which housed a 10 cm (3.9 in) PH M05 gun

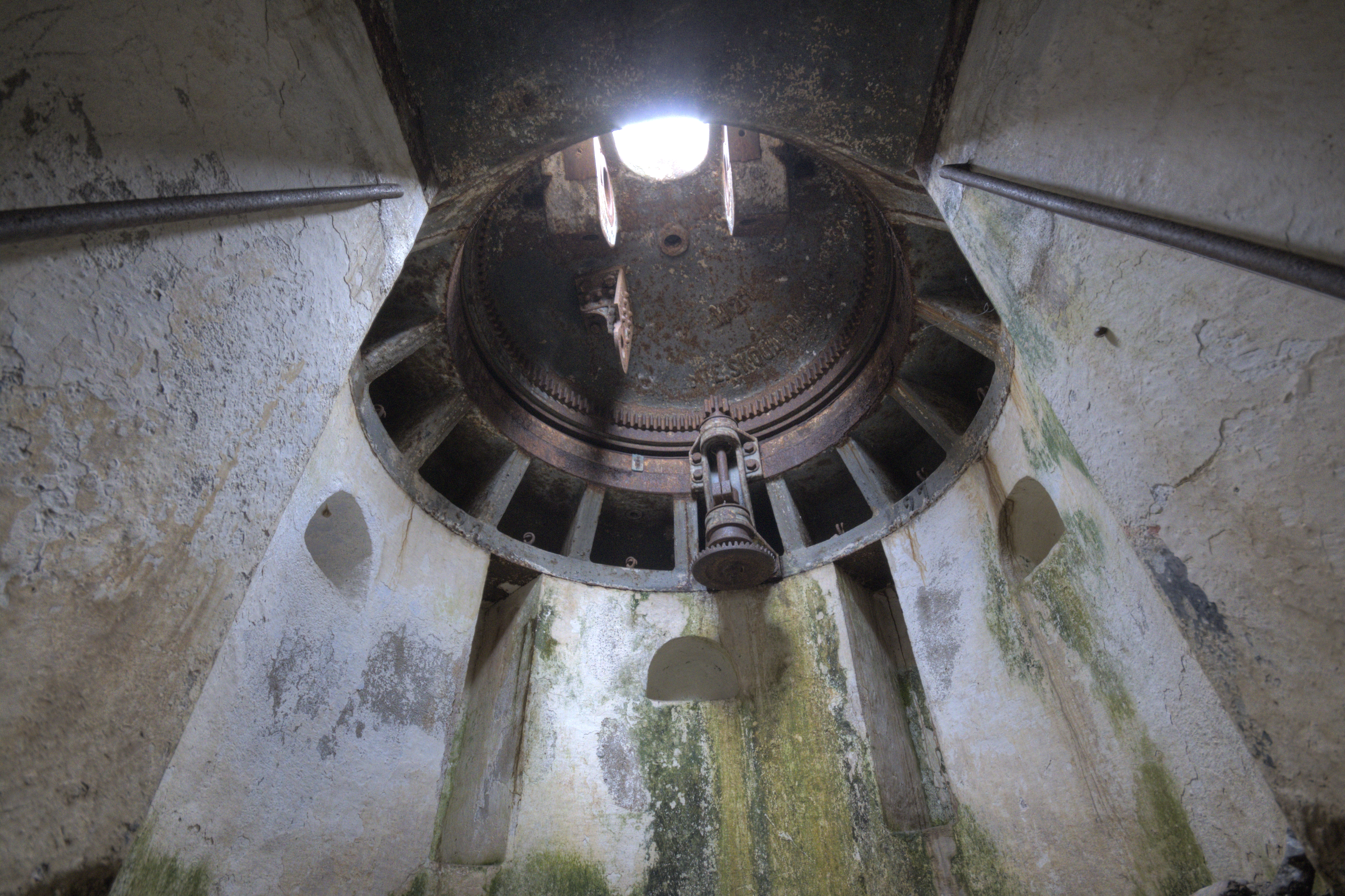
Interior of one of Fort Vrmac's M80/85 mortar turrets

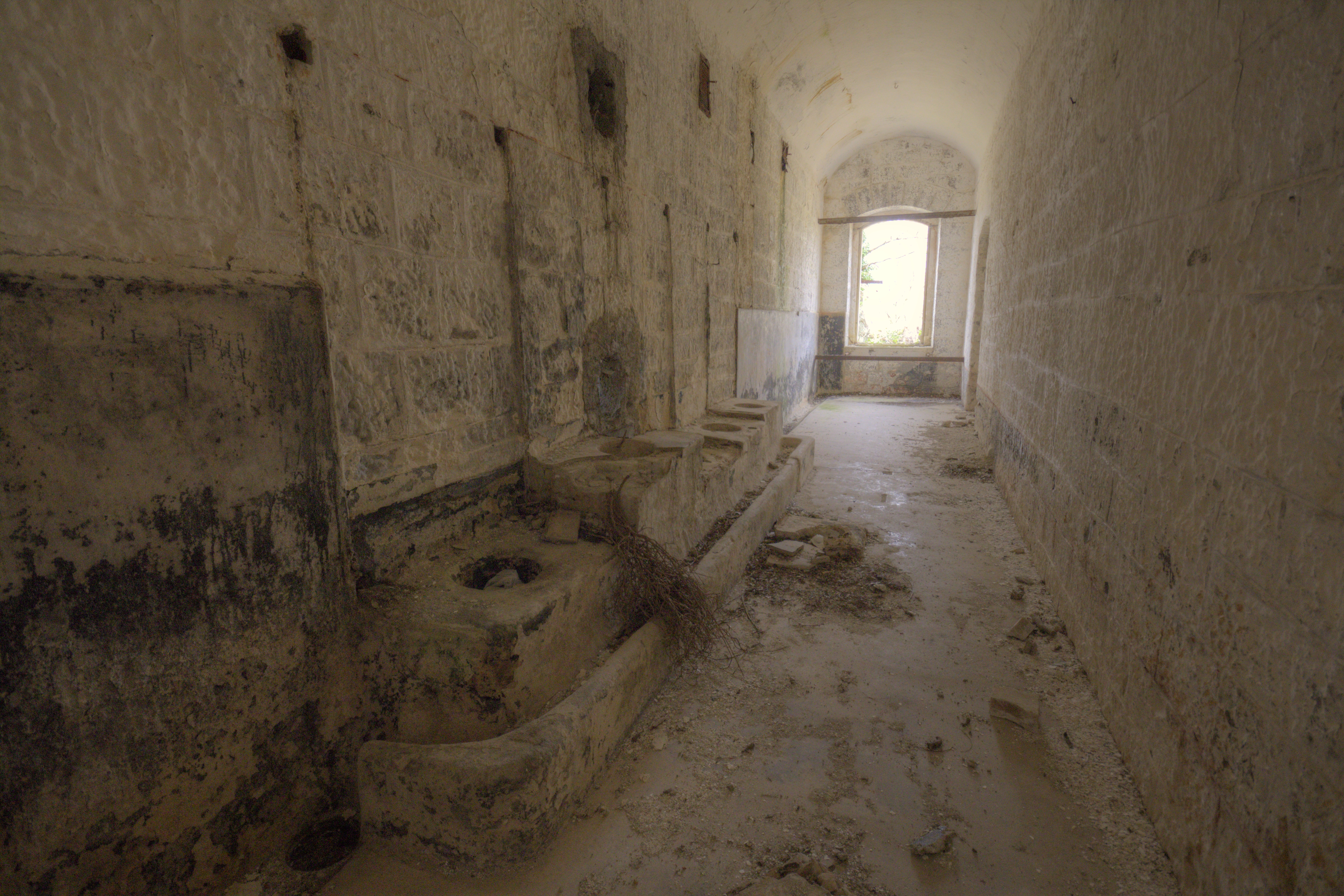
A set of stone latrines in the troop accommodation area

By the outbreak of the First World War it was the most modern fortress in the vicinity of the naval base at Kotor and was the centre of the Austro-Hungarian Third Military District's defences. However, it was regarded as outdated by this point and a new bomb-proof fortress was envisaged on Hoher Vrmac (Sveti Ilija), the highest point on the ridge, about 1.6 km (0.99 mi) to the north. The war made such an undertaking impossible and the five officers and 177 men stationed at Vrmac found themselves the target of heavy bombardments from Montenegrin territory, from weapons of up to 24 cm (9.4 in) calibre. The fortress was heavily damaged but after the Austrians seized Lovćen in the spring of 1916 and drove the Montenegrins out of artillery range, the damage was fully repaired. Its guns were removed and reused elsewhere.

After the collapse of the Austro-Hungarian Empire at the end of the war, the Bay of Kotor became part of the territory of Yugoslavia. Fort Vrmac was occupied for some years by the Royal Yugoslav Army before being abandoned. At some point during the Yugoslav tenure, one of the casemates was painted with icons depicting figures from Eastern Orthodox Christianity. The fortress remains in an abandoned condition; it is well-preserved overall and is the best-preserved of the fortifications on Vrmac. It can be visited by the public, though care needs to be taken, as there are open pits and holes in the floors.
