= Fort Gorazda =

World War I fortification in Montenegro

- Tvrđava Goražda / Thurmfort Gorazda
- near Kotor, Montenegro
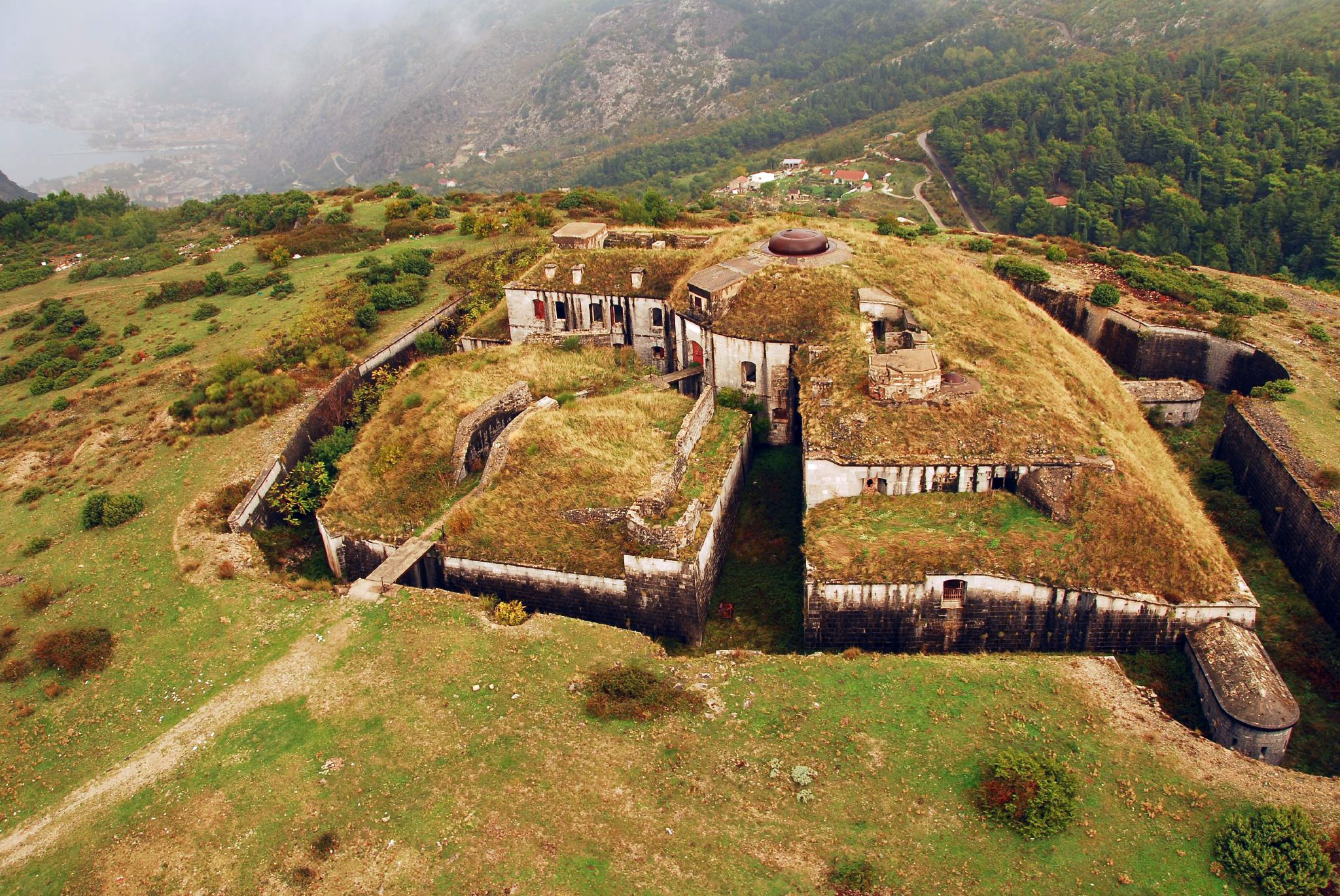
- Aerial view of the fort

Site information
- Type: Fortification
- Controlled by: Montenegro
- Condition: Abandoned

Location
- Coordinates: 42.395888°N 18.764136°E

Site history
- Built: 1860s? (first fort), 1884–6 (current structure)
- Built by: Austro-Hungarian Empire
- In use: 1860s–1918 (Austro-Hungarian Empire); 1918–1990s (Yugoslavia)
- Materials: Concrete, limestone
- Battles/wars: First World War

Garrison information
- Garrison: 8 officers & 195 men (wartime numbers)

Fort Gorazda (Montenegrin: Tvrđava Goražda/Тврђава Гораждa, German: Thurmfort Gorazda) is a fortification built by the Austro-Hungarian Empire near Kotor in Montenegro. The current fort was built between 1884–86 and replaced an earlier structure on the same site; its most notable feature is a 100-ton Gruson rotating turret on its roof, the last remaining example of its type. The fort was used by the Austrians in artillery duels against Montenegrin batteries stationed on Mount Lovćen during the First World War. The Montenegrins were unable to destroy it and were pushed out of range in 1916 by an Austrian offensive. The damage to the fort was repaired and its guns were removed to support the Austrian field army. It was used as a depot by the Yugoslav Army until as recently as the early 1990s. It was subsequently abandoned and can be visited by the public.

== Background ==
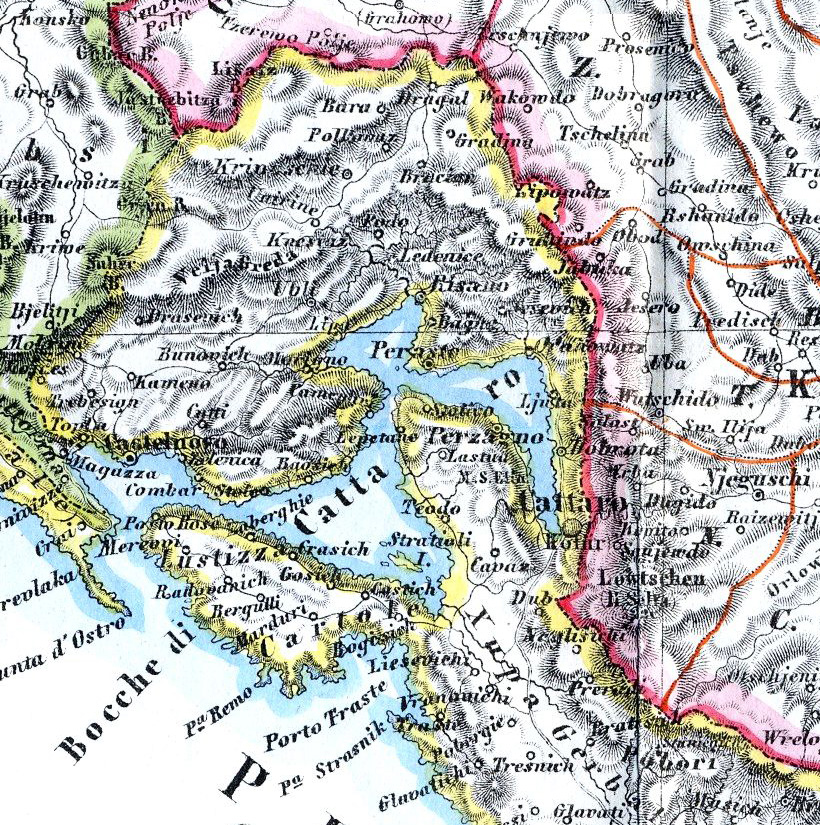
Map of the Bay of Kotor in 1862

The southernmost tip of the Austro-Hungarian Empire included the area of the Bay of Kotor, which was used by the empire as a major naval base centred on the town of Kotor (known then as Cattaro). The hinterland behind the bay was controlled by the independent principality (later kingdom) of Montenegro, which controlled the mountains to the east of Kotor.

The Austro-Hungarians faced significant problems in holding on to the territory, as the Montenegrins and their Russian allies aspired to take control of the Bay and Austrian rule was not universally accepted by the area's inhabitants. Two serious rebellions were mounted by the powerful Krivošije clan who lived on the eastern flanks of Mount Orjen above Risan. In 1869 the clan defeated an Austro-Hungarian force sent to quell their rebellion and nearly took the fortress at Goražde. The Austrians responded to the uprising by building a series of fortifications around the Bay of Kotor and at strategic points further inland, and strengthening or rebuilding existing fortresses, including the one at Goražde.

== Description ==
The fort stands on the hill of Goražde (known in Austro-Hungarian times as Gorazda) at an altitude of 452 m (1,483 ft), around 10 km (6.2 mi) from Kotor. It overlooks the Austrian-built road from Kotor to the former Montenegrin capital Cetinje and comprises a heavily reinforced stone and concrete structure situated within a ditch, with caponiers at the corners for close range defence. Its symmetrical layout, with two wings joined by a circular structure, is unusual for this type of mountain fortress. The fort dominates the heights above Kotor and guards one flank of the pass leading to the town, with the Škaljari Battery and Fort Vrmac a few kilometers away on the other side of the pass. From 1909, it was also supported by Fort Trašte located on the hills above the plain of Tivatsko polje.

The entrance to the two-storey fortress is reached via a curved track that passes between two retaining walls and crosses a retractable bridge across the ditch. The inscription "Thurmfort Gorazda" is still visible above the main entrance, which is protected by a steel door, still in situ. The barracks rooms are situated on the lower level, with casemates on the upper level, reached via two spiral staircases. Two rotating Škoda observation turrets are situated on the roof, above infantry positions that were constructed to boost the fort's close-range defences. A giant 100-ton German-made Gruson rotating turret, which once housed the fort's main armament, sits above the central part of the fort. The turret is the last surviving example of its kind and was manually powered, with a two-man crank used to rotate it.

Exterior features of Fort Gorazda
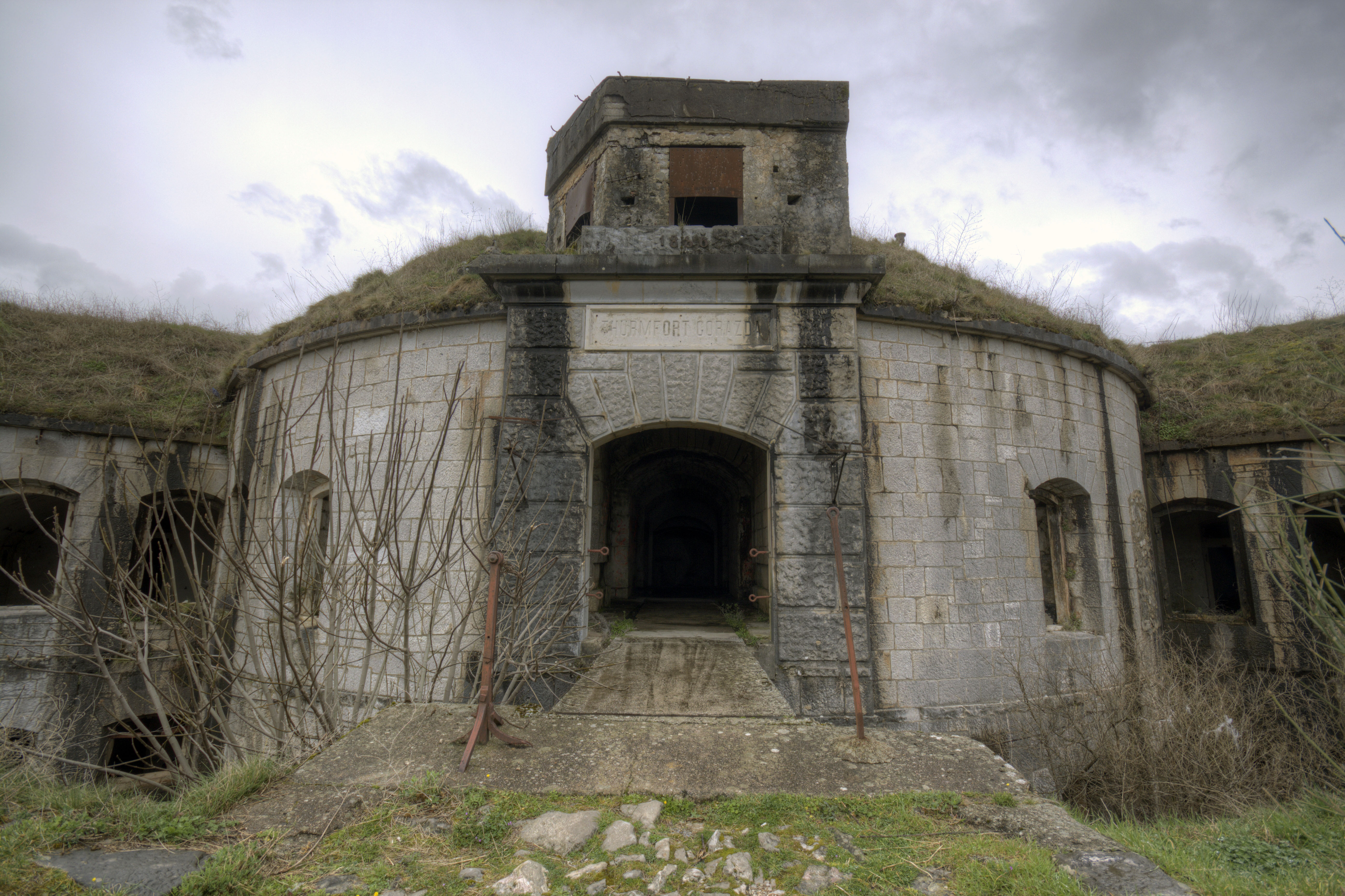
Entrance to the fort with concrete infantry position above

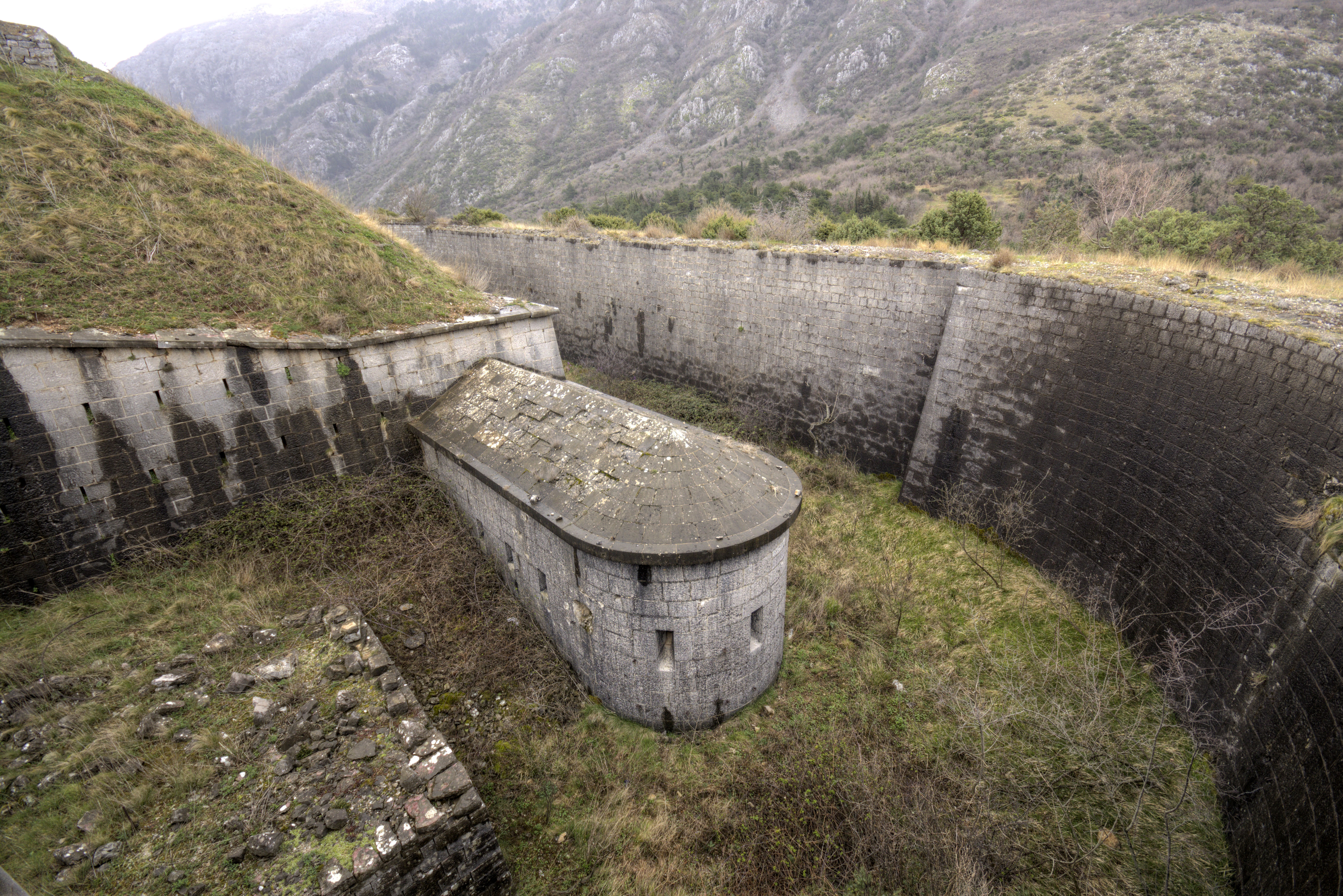
Ditch with caponier on the fort's south-east flank

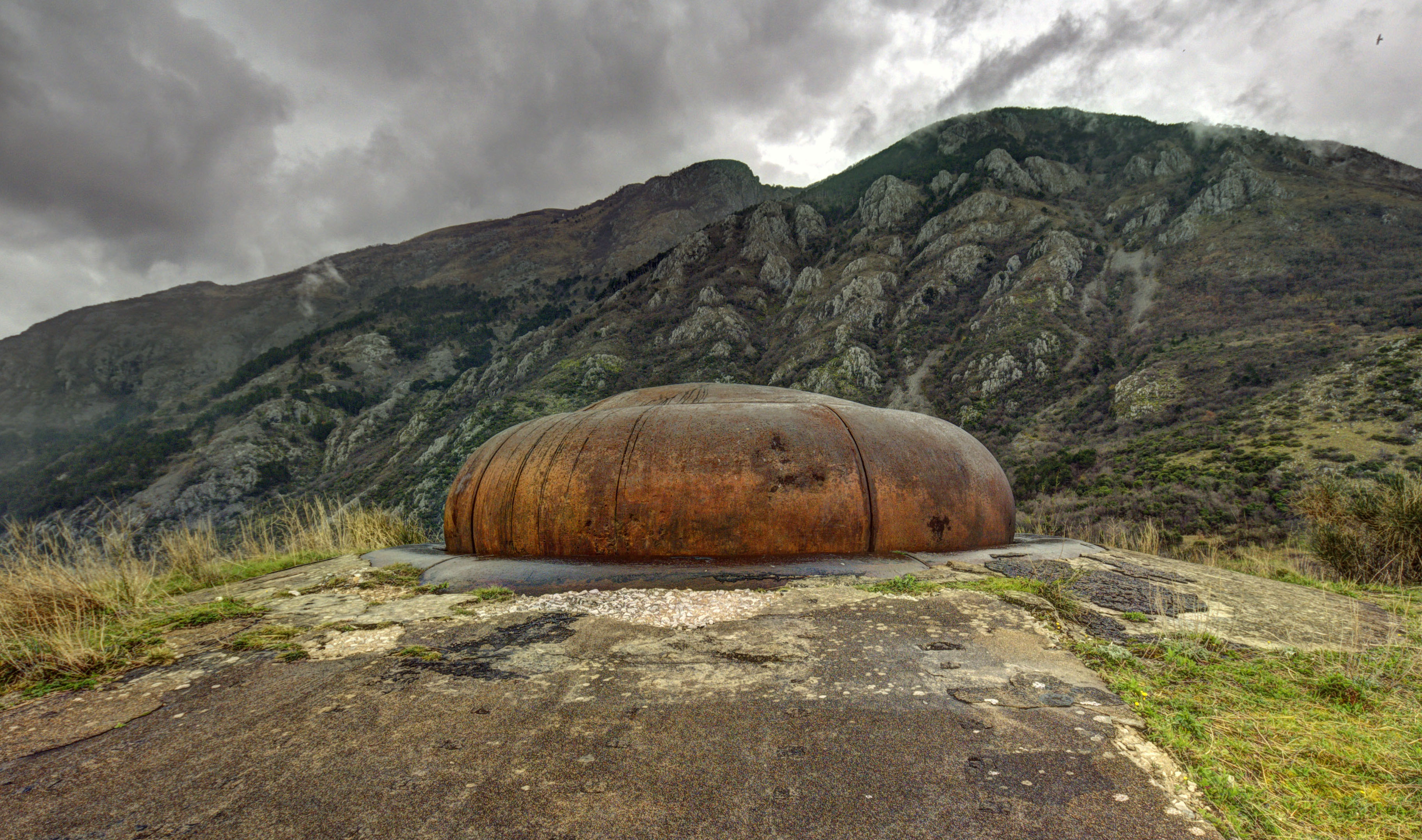
The 100 ton Gruson rotating gun turret

== History ==
The fortress's predecessor was built prior to the 1869 uprising but was replaced with the current structure between 1884 and 1886. It was one of the first of the new fortresses around the Bay of Kotor to be constructed as part of the Austrians' late 19th century programme of improvements in the area. The two observation posts were installed in 1906–07. Although plans were mooted in 1910 to redevelop the fortress and install two new howitzer turrets and machine-gun and observation turrets, the outbreak of the First World War precluded this. During the war, it was garrisoned by 8 officers and 195 men and was armed with six 12 cm (4.7 in) minimum charter M80 mortars and two 10 cm (3.9 in) M4 casemate guns, plus three M4 machine guns, two M7 machine guns and 25 gun carriages.

The fortress was heavily attacked by the Montenegrins from positions on Mount Lovćen, prompting the Austro-Hungarians to add the two concrete infantry positions on the roof in 1915 to guard against close-range attacks. Although it was bombarded with artillery weapons of up to 24 cm (9.4 in) calibre, they did little damage and in 1916 an Austrian offensive pushed Montenegrin forces out of artillery range. The fortress was repaired and stripped of its guns, which were used to support the Austrian field army. It was taken over by the Yugoslav Army following the war and continued to be used as an army depot until as recently as the early 1990s. It is now abandoned and is freely accessible by the public. Its attractive situation has led to it being used on several occasions as a film location, most recently by the Italian production Il Cuore nel Pozzo in 2005. However, its accessibility and lack of protection by the state has meant that it has been extensively targeted by metal thieves, who have stolen many of the fort's interior fittings.

Interior features of Fort Gorazda
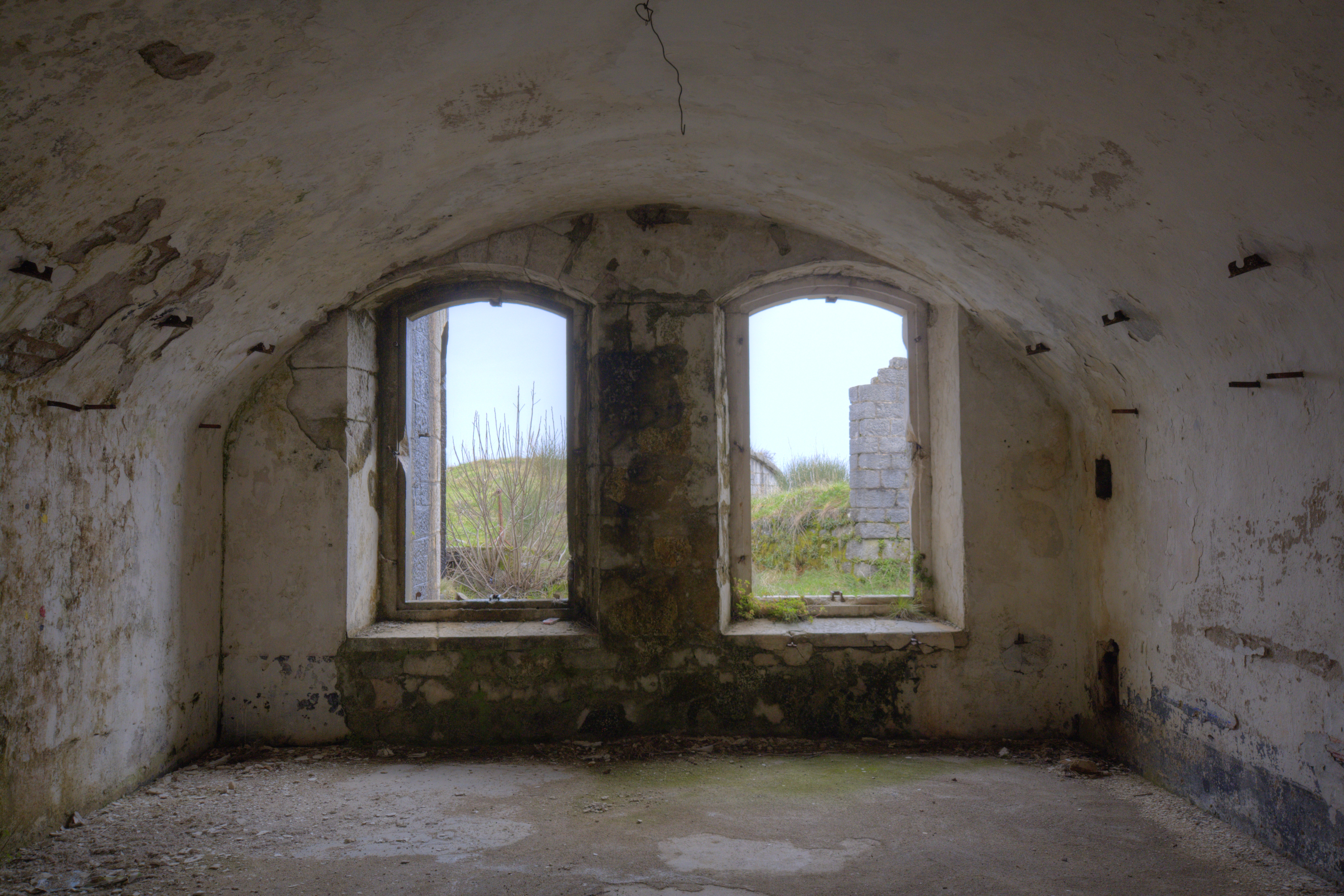
Barracks room in the fortress

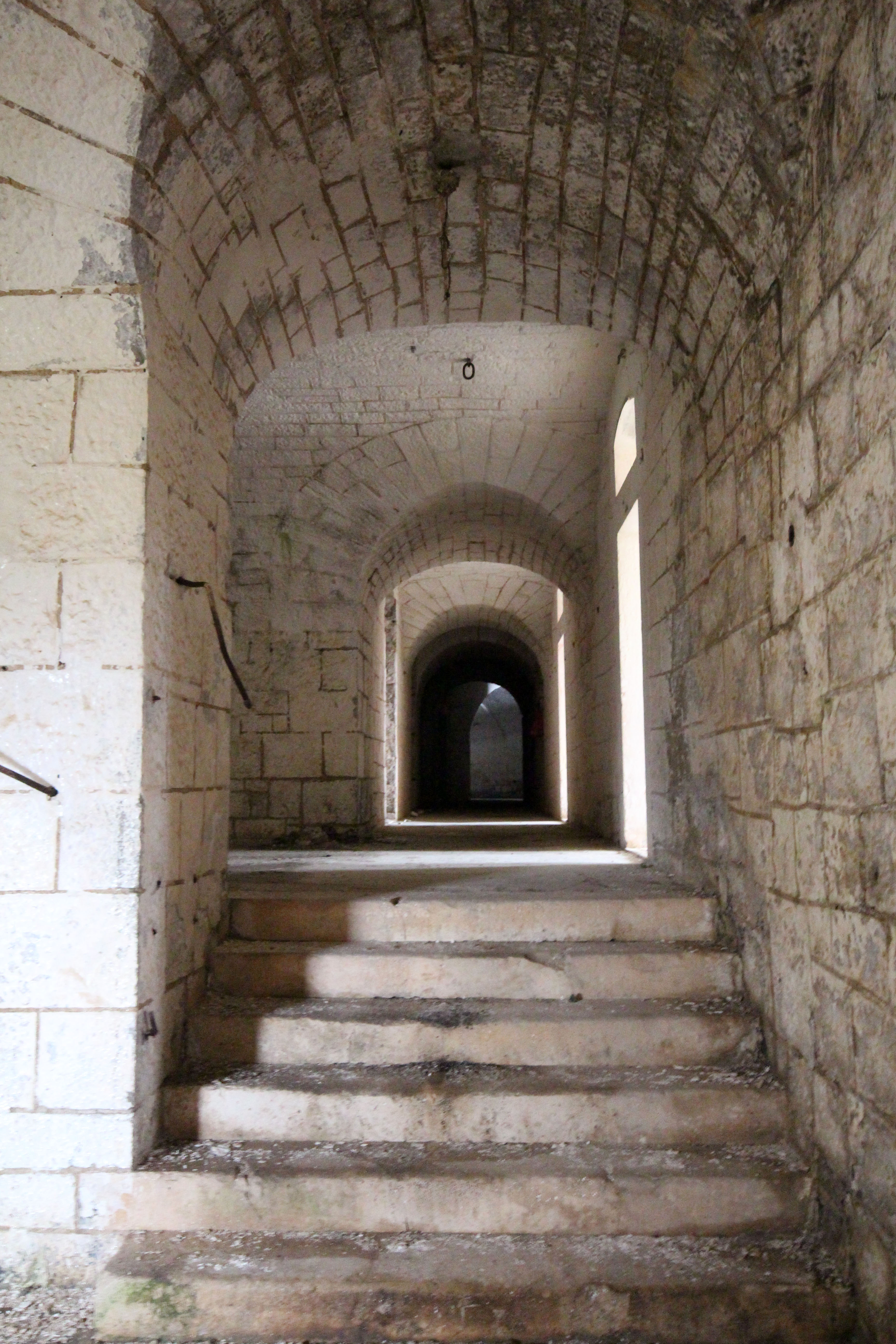
Interior corridor

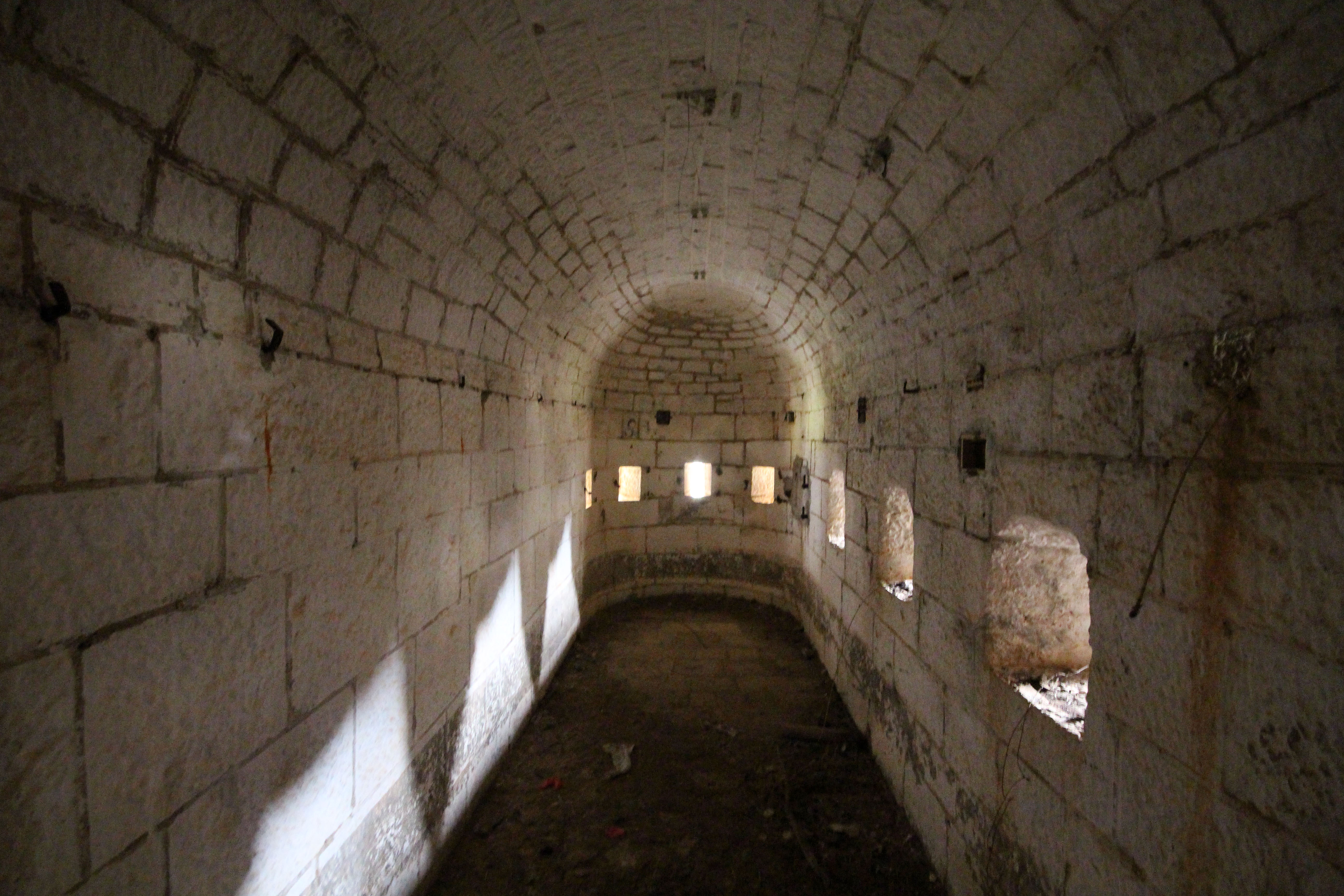
Interior of a caponier
