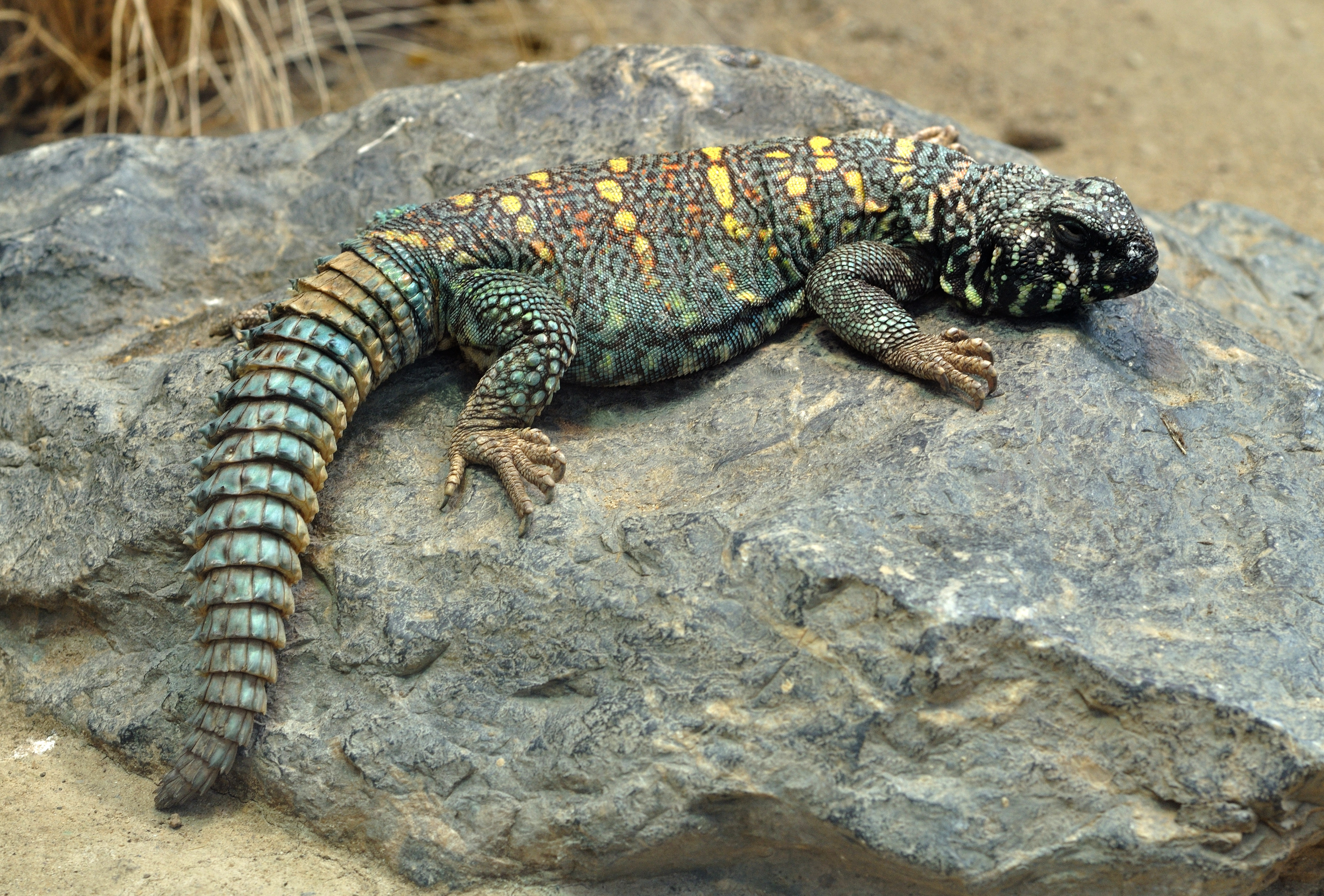
- Uromastyx ornata

Scientific classification
- Kingdom: Animalia
- Phylum: Chordata
- Class: Reptilia
- Order: Squamata
- Suborder: Iguania
- Family: Agamidae
- Subfamily: Uromastycinae; Theobald, 1868

Genera
- Two; see text

= Uromastycinae =

Subfamily of lizards

Uromastycinae is a subfamily of reptiles in the family Agamidae.

== Genera ==
The subfamily consists of the following two genera:

Image	Genus	Species
	Saara Gray, 1845	Saara asmussi (Strauch, 1863); Saara hardwickii (Gray, 1827); Saara loricata (Blanford, 1874)
	Uromastyx Merrem, 1820	Uromastyx acanthinura Bell, 1825 – North African mastigure, North African spiny-tailed lizard; Uromastyx aegyptia (Forskål, 1775) – Egyptian mastigure, Egyptian spiny-tailed lizard; Uromastyx alfredschmidti Wilms & Böhme, 2001 – Schmidt's mastigure, Schmidt's spiny-tailed lizard; Uromastyx benti (Anderson, 1894) – Bent's mastigure, Yemeni spiny-tailed lizard; Uromastyx dispar Heyden, 1827 – Sudan mastigure; Uromastyx (dispar) dispar Heyden, 1827; Uromastyx (dispar) flavifasciata Mertens, 1962; Uromastyx (dispar) maliensis Joger & Lambert, 1996 – Mali uromastyx; Uromastyx geyri (L. Müller, 1922) – Geyr's spiny-tailed lizard, Saharan spiny-tailed lizard; Uromastyx macfadyeni Parker, 1932 – Macfadyen's mastigure; Uromastyx nigriventris Rothschild & Hartert, 1912 – Moroccan spiny-tailed lizard; Uromastyx occidentalis Mateo, Geniez, Lopez-Jurado & Bons, 1999; Uromastyx ocellata Lichtenstein, 1823 – Ocellated spinytail; Uromastyx ornata Heyden, 1827 – ornate mastigure; Uromastyx princeps O’Shaughnessy, 1880 – princely spiny-tailed lizard, Somalian mastigure; Uromastyx shobraki Wilms & Schmitz, 2007; Uromastyx thomasi Parker, 1930 – Omani spiny-tailed lizard, Thomas's mastigure; Uromastyx yemenensis Wilms & Schmitz, 2007 – South Arabian spiny-tailed lizard
