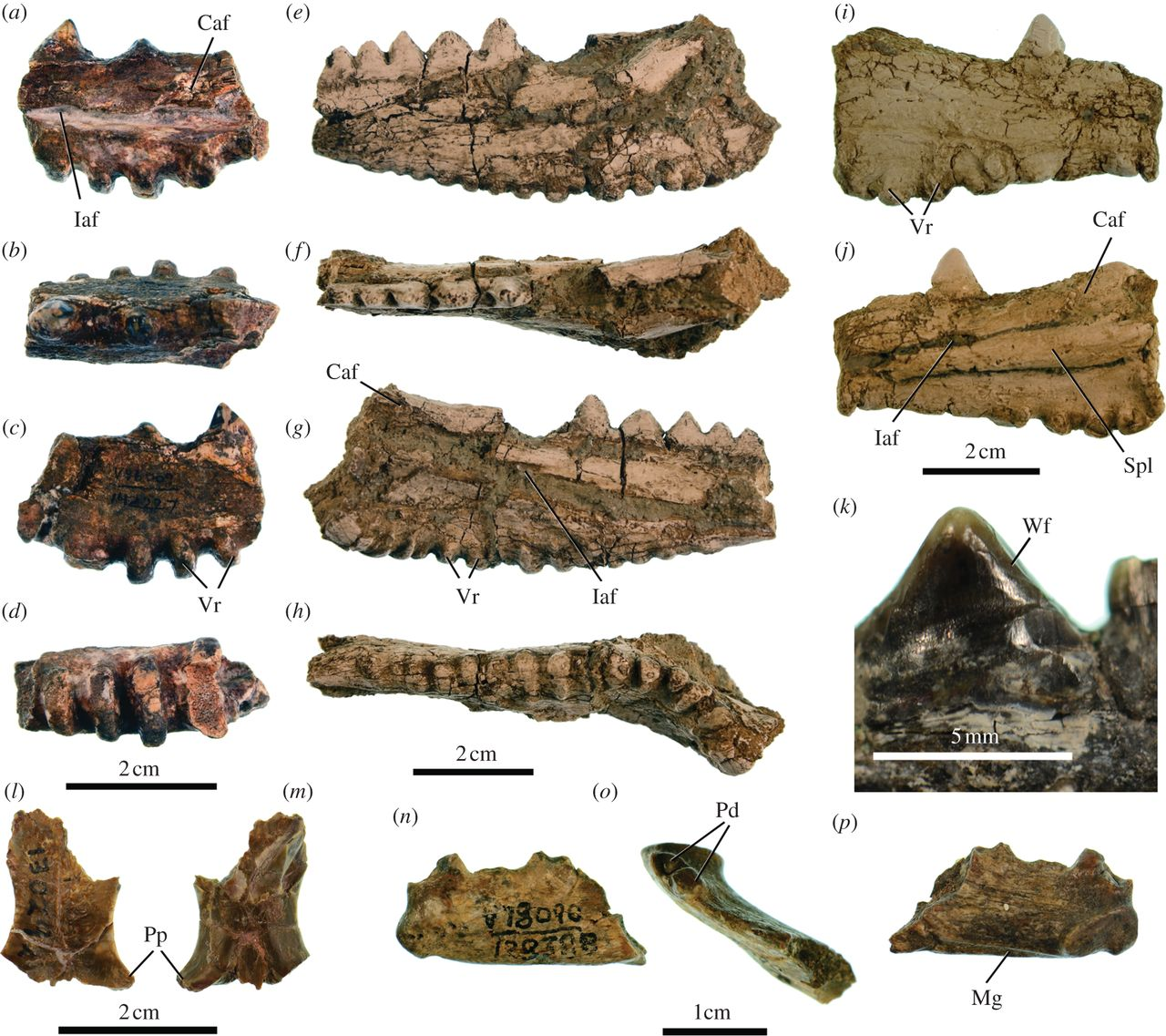
- Assorted jaw fossils of B. morrisoni

Scientific classification
- Kingdom: Animalia
- Phylum: Chordata
- Class: Reptilia
- Order: Squamata
- Suborder: Iguania
- Infraorder: Acrodonta
- Genus: †Barbaturex; Head et al., 2013

Type species
- Barbaturex morrisoni Head et al., 2013

= Barbaturex =

Barbaturex Temporal range: Eocene, 37.2 Ma

Extinct genus of lizards

Barbaturex is an extinct genus of giant herbivorous iguanian lizards from Pondaung Formation, the Eocene of Myanmar. It is represented by a single species, Barbaturex morrisoni, which is known from several partial dentaries (lower jaw bones) and a fused pair of frontals, two bones that form part of the top of the skull. Based on the size of these bones, Barbaturex morrisoni is estimated to have been about 1 metre (3.3 ft) from snout to vent, and possibly up to 6 feet (1.8 m) including the tail. Barbaturex morrisoni was named after The Doors frontman Jim Morrison, a play on his epithet "The Lizard King". The genus's name is a portmanteau of the Latin words Barbatus and rex, meaning "bearded king", in reference to ridges along the mandible and the lizard's large size.

== Ecology ==
Barbaturex lived in a dry tropical forest. It is thought to have been herbivorous, living within a typical Eocene fauna composed of hyaenodonts, basal primates, various artiodactyls and soft-shelled turtles.

== Relationships ==
Barbaturex belongs to a major group of lizards called Iguania, represented today by iguanas, chameleons, and agamids. It belongs to a clade or evolutionary grouping of iguanians called Acrodonta. Like other members of Acrodonta, Barbaturex has an acrodont dentition at the back of its jaws, meaning that the teeth are completely fused with the jaw bone, and a pleurodont dentition at the front of its jaws, meaning that the teeth are fused with the inside surface of the jaw bone. A phylogenetic analysis published with its initial description placed Barbaturex as the sister taxon or closest relative of the group Uromasticinae, which includes the living Uromastyx, a genus of short-skulled herbivorous agamid lizards. Below is a cladogram showing the relationship of Barbaturex to other members of Acrodonta:

- Acrodonta
  - - Leiolepis
    - - †Barbaturex
      - Uromasticinae
  - - - Chamaeleonidae
      - - Hydrosaurus
        - - Physignathus
          - - Amphibolurinae
            - - Agaminae
              - Draconinae
