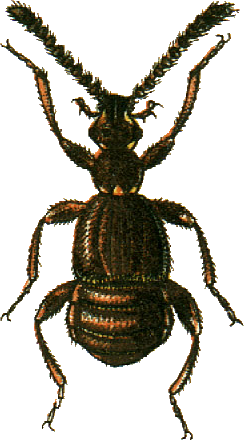

Scientific classification
- Kingdom: Animalia
- Phylum: Arthropoda
- Class: Insecta
- Order: Coleoptera
- Suborder: Polyphaga
- Infraorder: Staphyliniformia
- Family: Staphylinidae
- Supertribe: Pselaphitae
- Tribe: Ctenistini
- Genus: Centrotoma
- Species: C. lucifuga

Binomial name
- Centrotoma lucifuga Heyden, 1849

= Centrotoma lucifuga =

Species of beetle

Centrotoma lucifuga is a species of ant-loving beetle in the tribe Ctenistini of the family Staphylinidae.

The species was first described in 1849 by Carl von Heyden.

It is listed as critically endangered by the Czech Republic.
