= Phytoecia albovittigera =

Scientific classification
- Domain: Eukaryota
- Kingdom: Animalia
- Phylum: Arthropoda
- Class: Insecta
- Order: Coleoptera
- Suborder: Polyphaga
- Infraorder: Cucujiformia
- Family: Cerambycidae
- Genus: Phytoecia
- Species: P. albovittigera

Binomial name
- Phytoecia albovittigera Heyden, 1863

Synonyms
- Conizonia albovittigera (Heyden) Breuning, 1954; Coptosia semiannulicornis Pic, 1936; Coptosia albovittigera (Heyden, 1863); Phytoecia reichei Kraatz; Coptosia languida Fairmaire, 1864

Species of beetle

Phytoecia albovittigera is a species of beetle in the family Cerambycidae. It was first described by Carl von Heyden in 1863. It is known from North Macedonia, Greece, Bulgaria, and Turkey.

Phytoecia albovittigera measure 5.5–11 mm (0.22–0.43 in).
