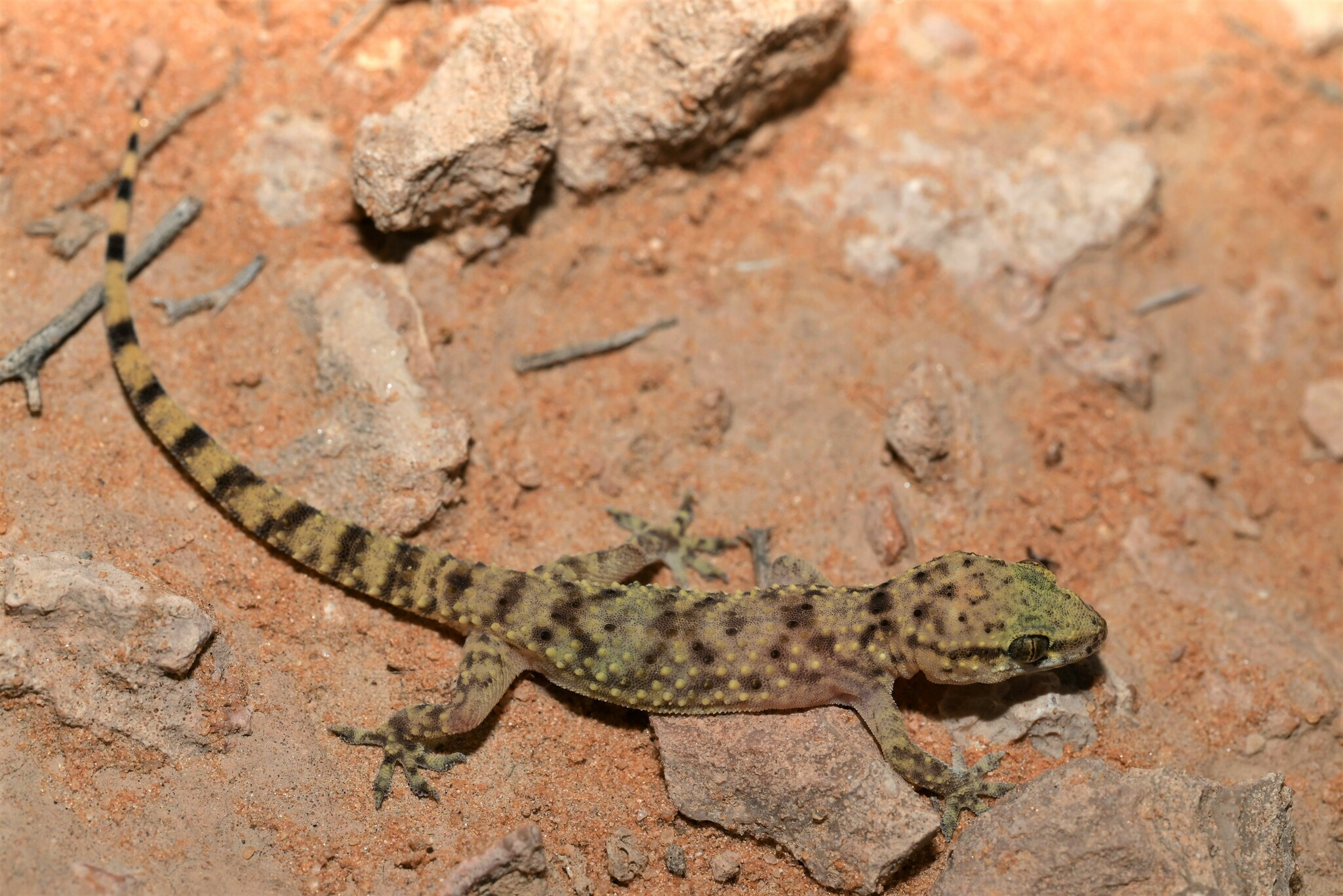

Scientific classification
- Domain: Eukaryota
- Kingdom: Animalia
- Phylum: Chordata
- Class: Reptilia
- Order: Squamata
- Infraorder: Gekkota
- Family: Gekkonidae
- Genus: Hemidactylus
- Species: H. granosus

Binomial name
- Hemidactylus granosus Heyden, 1827

Synonyms
- Hemidactylus verrucosus; Hemidactylus turcicus

= Hemidactylus granosus =

Species of gecko

Hemidactylus granosus is a species of gecko. It is found on the Sinai Peninsula in Egypt and in Saudi Arabia.
