= Dorcadion bangi =

Scientific classification
- Kingdom: Animalia
- Phylum: Arthropoda
- Clade: Pancrustacea
- Class: Insecta
- Order: Coleoptera
- Suborder: Polyphaga
- Infraorder: Cucujiformia
- Family: Cerambycidae
- Genus: Dorcadion
- Species: D. bangi

Binomial name
- Dorcadion bangi Heyden, 1894

Species of beetle

Dorcadion bangi is a species of beetle in the family Cerambycidae. It was described by Carl von Heyden in 1894.

== Subspecies ==
- Dorcadion bangi bangi Heyden, 1894
- Dorcadion bangi heinzorum Braun, 1975
- Dorcadion bangi roridum Pesarini & Sabbadini, 1998
