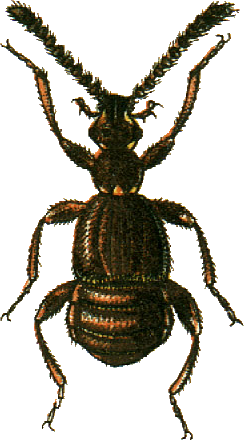
- Centrotoma lucifuga

Scientific classification
- Kingdom: Animalia
- Phylum: Arthropoda
- Class: Insecta
- Order: Coleoptera
- Suborder: Polyphaga
- Infraorder: Staphyliniformia
- Family: Staphylinidae
- Subfamily: Pselaphinae
- Supertribe: Pselaphitae
- Tribe: Ctenistini
- Genus: Centrotoma; Heyden, 1849

= Centrotoma =

Genus of beetles

Centrotoma is a genus of ant-loving beetles in the tribe of Ctenistini of the family Staphylinidae.

The genus was first described in 1849 by Carl von Heyden, with the type species given by him as Centrotoma lucifuga.

== Species ==
Species:

- Centrotoma brucki Saulcy, 1874
- Centrotoma canussiana Schatzmayr, 1913
- Centrotoma kaszabi Besuchet, 1969
- Centrotoma lucifuga C. Heyden, 1849
- Centrotoma ludyi Reitter, 1882
- Centrotoma penicillata L. Schaufuss, 1863
- Centrotoma prodiga Sharp, 1874
- Centrotoma szeptyckii Löbl, 1974
