= Biotus =

Scientific classification
- Kingdom: Animalia
- Phylum: Arthropoda
- Class: Insecta
- Order: Coleoptera
- Suborder: Polyphaga
- Infraorder: Staphyliniformia
- Family: Staphylinidae
- Tribe: Ctenistini
- Genus: Biotus; Casey, 1887

Genus of beetles

Biotus is a genus of ant-loving beetles in the family Staphylinidae. There is one described species in Biotus, B. formicarius.
