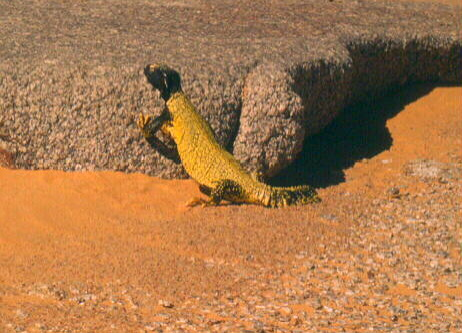

Conservation status
- Least Concern (IUCN 3.1)
- CITES Appendix II

Scientific classification
- Kingdom: Animalia
- Phylum: Chordata
- Class: Reptilia
- Order: Squamata
- Suborder: Iguania
- Family: Agamidae
- Genus: Uromastyx
- Species: U. dispar

Binomial name
- Uromastyx dispar Heyden, 1827

= Uromastyx dispar =

Species of lizard

Uromastyx dispar, the Sudan mastigure, is a species of agamid lizard. It is found in Mauritania, Sudan, Chad, Western Sahara, Algeria, and Mali.

There are three subspecies recognized:

- Uromastyx dispar dispar Heyden, 1827
- Uromastyx (dispar) flavifasciata Mertens, 1962
- Uromastyx dispar maliensis Joger & Lambert, 1996 – Mali uromastyx
