= Ctenisis phylanderi =

Scientific classification
- Kingdom: Animalia
- Phylum: Arthropoda
- Class: Insecta
- Order: Coleoptera
- Suborder: Polyphaga
- Infraorder: Staphyliniformia
- Family: Staphylinidae
- Genus: Ctenisis
- Species: C. phylanderi

Binomial name
- Ctenisis phylanderi Chandler, 2003

Species of beetle

Ctenisis phylanderi is a species of ant-loving beetle in the family Staphylinidae. It is found in North America.
