= Atinus =

Scientific classification
- Kingdom: Animalia
- Phylum: Arthropoda
- Class: Insecta
- Order: Coleoptera
- Suborder: Polyphaga
- Infraorder: Staphyliniformia
- Family: Staphylinidae
- Tribe: Ctenistini
- Genus: Atinus; Horn, 1868

Genus of beetles

Atinus is a genus of ant-loving beetles in the family Staphylinidae. There are at least two described species in Atinus.

== Species ==
These two species belong to the genus Atinus:

- Atinus brevicornis Casey, 1894
- Atinus monilicornis (Brendel, 1866)
