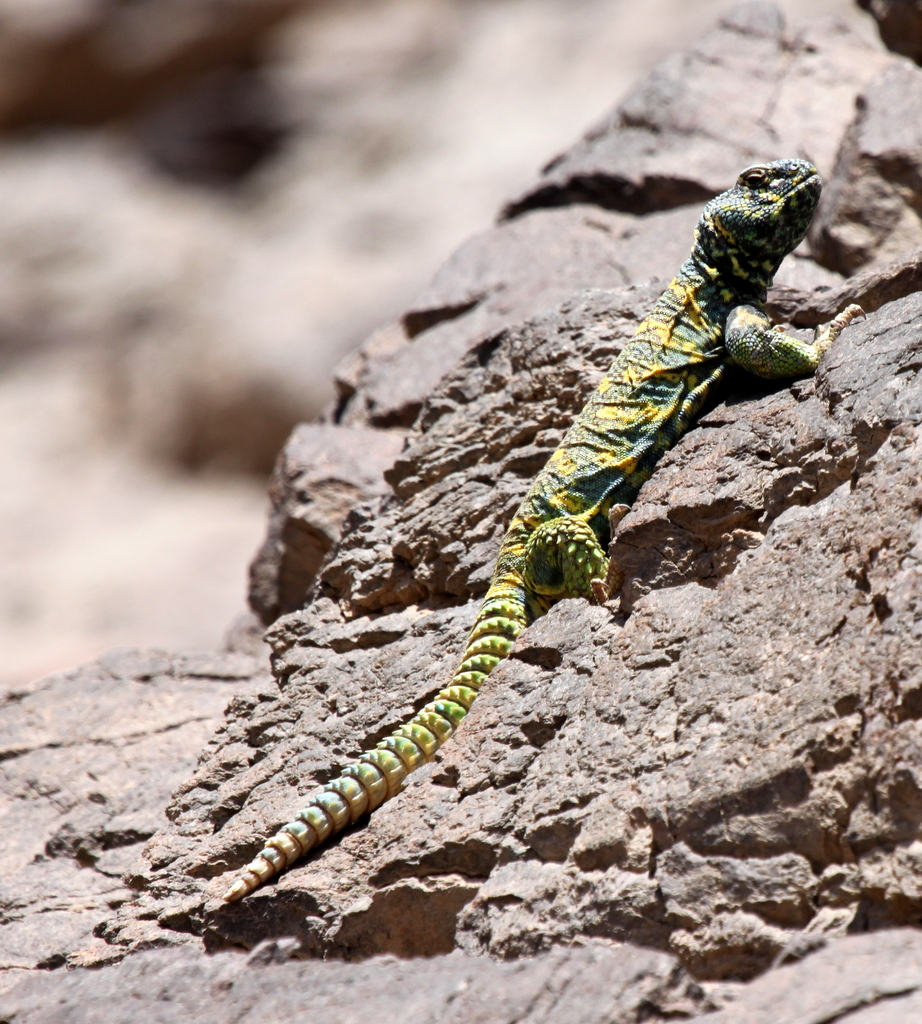

Conservation status
- Least Concern (IUCN 3.1)
- CITES Appendix II

Scientific classification
- Kingdom: Animalia
- Phylum: Chordata
- Class: Reptilia
- Order: Squamata
- Suborder: Iguania
- Family: Agamidae
- Genus: Uromastyx
- Species: U. ornata

Binomial name
- Uromastyx ornata Heyden, 1827

Synonyms
- List: Uromastyx ornatus Rüppell, 1827; Uromastix ornatus A.M.C. Duméril & Bibron, 1837; Uromastyx ocellatus ornatus Arnold, 1986; Uromastyx ornata Wilms, 2001

= Uromastyx ornata =

Species of lizard

Uromastyx ornata, commonly called the ornate mastigure, is a species of lizard in the family Agamidae.

== Etymology ==
The subspecific name, philbyi, is in honor of British Arabist Harry St. John Bridger Philby.

== Subspecies ==
Two subspecies are recognized as being valid, including the nominotypical subspecies.

- Uromastyx ornata ornata Heyden, 1827
- Uromastyx ornata philbyi Parker, 1938

== Geographic range and habitat ==
The species is endemic to the Middle East. It can be found on rocky areas in Egypt, Southern Israel, Saudi Arabia, and Yemen.

== Description ==
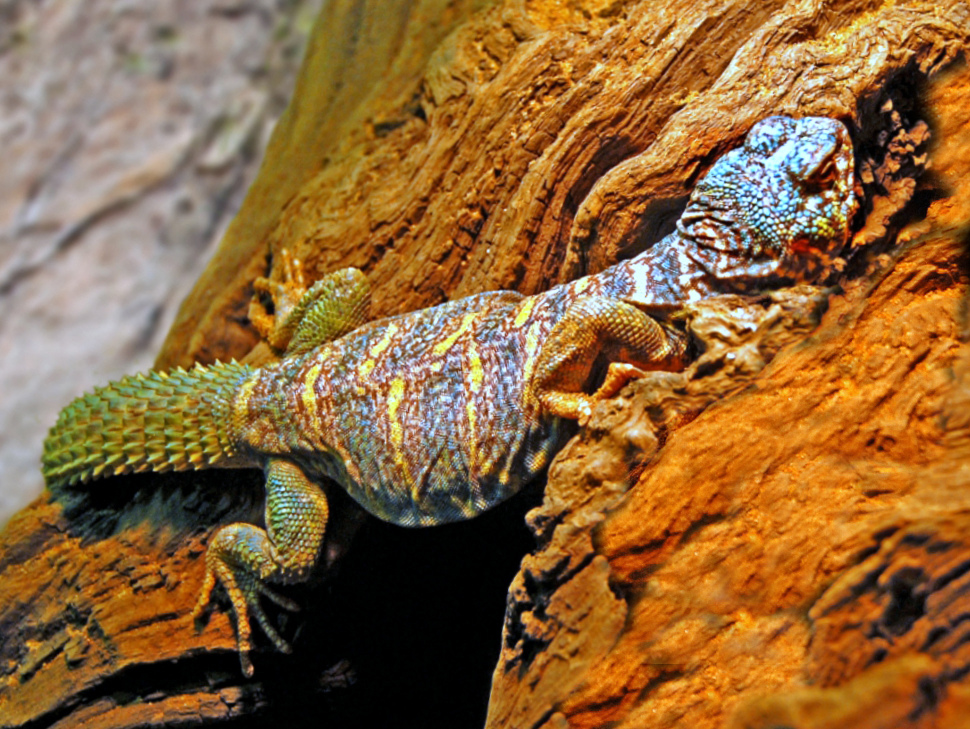
Ornate mastigure

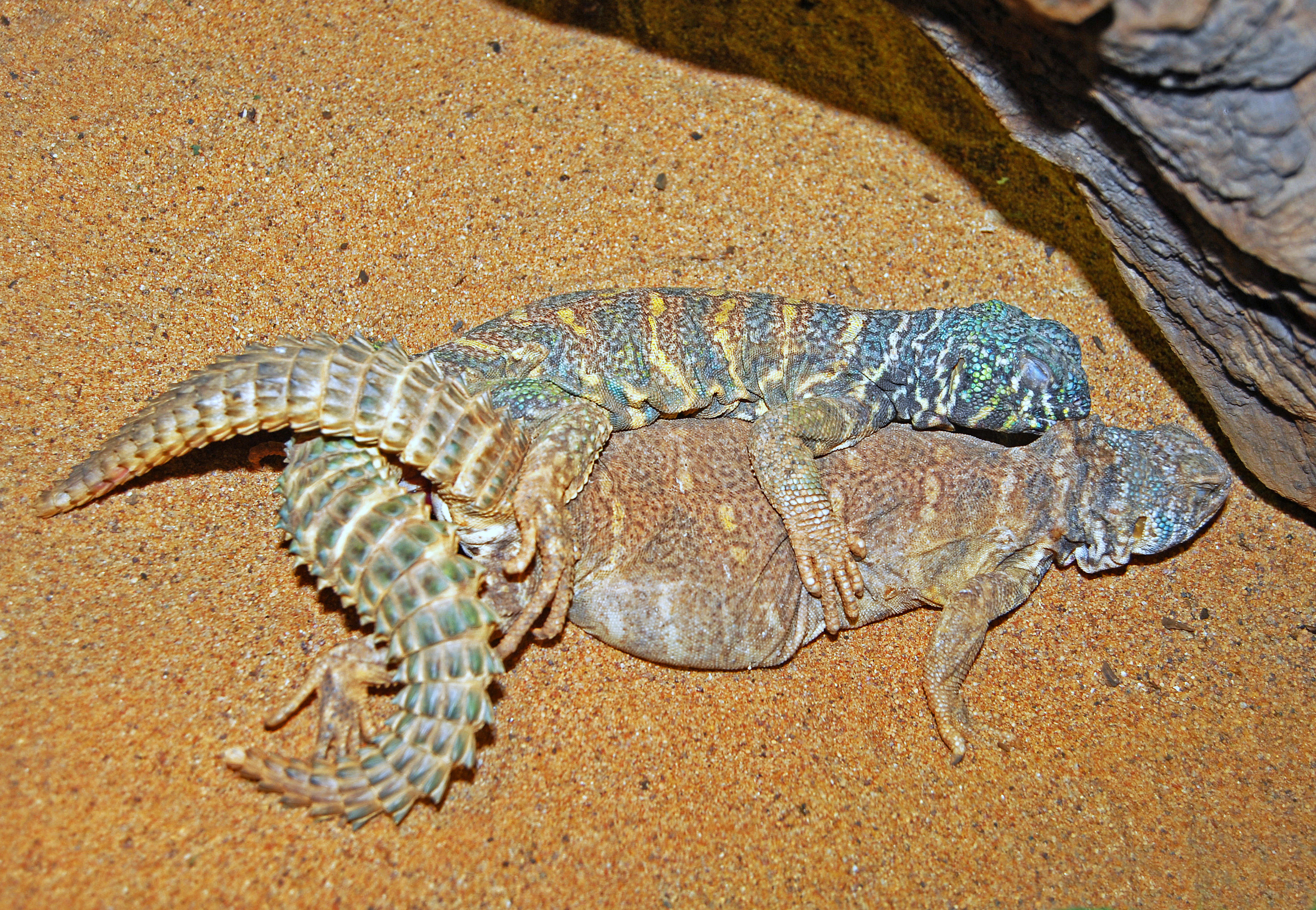
Mating pair

Uromastyx ornata can reach a total length of about 35 cm (14 inches). These medium-sized lizards are among the most colorful members of the genus. Body color is rather variable, but basically greenish, with a series of yellowish annuli. They have a significantly long, very spiny and slightly flattened tail, formed by 20-23 segments. On the anterior margin of the ear opening there are a few enlarged scales. On the upper side of the thighs small spines are present.

They are sexually dichromatic, as body colour depends on different sexes. In males, the main color of the back is green, blue or red with dark brown bands which can be filled with yellow or rounded yellow spots, often forming transversal rows. Females are dimmer, with a light brown background of the back and light yellow transversal lines. The belly is whitish.

== Behavior ==
They are active during the day and live alone or in small groups consisting of one male and several females. They dig burrows up to 1 meter deep. During the breeding season adult males become very colorful. They, like most other members of their genus, are primarily herbivorous, though sometimes taking insects in the case of several species as well as various individuals.

== Conservation status ==
U. ornata is considered Least Concern by the IUCN, but rated as EN (B,C2a) according to "Endangered species in Israel, the red list of threatened animals".

== Bibliography ==
- Boulenger GA (1885). Catalogue of the Lizards in the British Museum (Natural History). Second Edition. Volume I. ... Agamidæ. London: Trustees of the British Museum (Natural History). (Taylor and Francis, printers). xii + 436 pp. + Plates I-XXXII. (Uromastix ornatus, p. 406).
- Heyden CHG (1827). "Reptilien ". pp. 1–24 + Plates 1-6. In: Rüppell E (1827). Atlas zu der Reise in nördlichen Afrika. Erste Abtheilung Zoologie. Frankfurt am Main: H.L. Brönner. vi + 350 pp. (Uromastyx ornatus, new species, pp. 1–5 + Plate 1). (in German).
