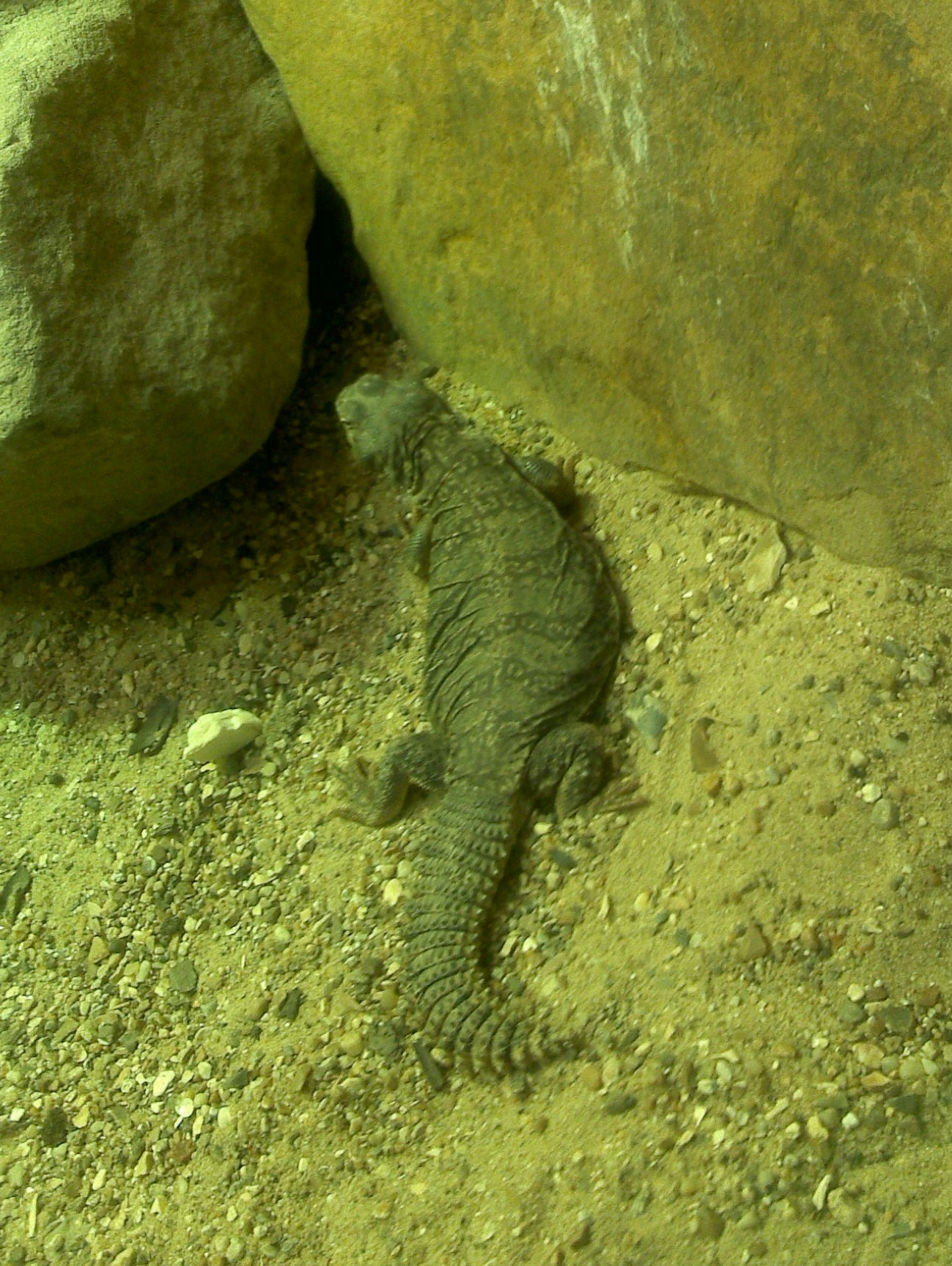

Scientific classification
- Domain: Eukaryota
- Kingdom: Animalia
- Phylum: Chordata
- Class: Reptilia
- Order: Squamata
- Suborder: Iguania
- Family: Agamidae
- Genus: Uromastyx
- Species: U. dispar
- Subspecies: U. d. flavifasciata

Trinomial name
- Uromastyx dispar flavifasciata Mertens, 1962

= Uromastyx dispar flavifasciata =

Species of lizard

Uromastyx dispar flavifasciata is a subspecies of spiny-tailed lizard belonging to the family Agamidae. It is found in rocky, arid and desert habitats in North Africa, its range including parts of Algeria, Mali and Niger. While sometimes considered a separate species, other treat it as a subspecies of Uromastyx dispar.

This is a medium, desert-adapted species for the genus, with an average length of around 50 cm. This lizard is usually beige or green-brown with patterns on their backs and a characteristic tail. They nurture morning dew or the moisture from their burrows, and they can survive severe drought periods.
