= Ctenisodes ocularis =

Scientific classification
- Kingdom: Animalia
- Phylum: Arthropoda
- Class: Insecta
- Order: Coleoptera
- Suborder: Polyphaga
- Infraorder: Staphyliniformia
- Family: Staphylinidae
- Genus: Ctenisodes
- Species: C. ocularis

Binomial name
- Ctenisodes ocularis (Casey, 1894)

Species of ant-loving beetle

Ctenisodes ocularis is a species of ant-loving beetle in the family Staphylinidae. It is found in North America.
