= Atinus monilicornis =

Scientific classification
- Kingdom: Animalia
- Phylum: Arthropoda
- Class: Insecta
- Order: Coleoptera
- Suborder: Polyphaga
- Infraorder: Staphyliniformia
- Family: Staphylinidae
- Genus: Atinus
- Species: A. monilicornis

Binomial name
- Atinus monilicornis (Brendel, 1866)

Species of beetle

Atinus monilicornis is a species of ant-loving beetle in the family Staphylinidae. It is found in North America. It can be found in nests of the ant species Paratrechina faisonensis.
