= Centrotoma szeptyckii =

Scientific classification
- Kingdom: Animalia
- Phylum: Arthropoda
- Class: Insecta
- Order: Coleoptera
- Suborder: Polyphaga
- Infraorder: Staphyliniformia
- Family: Staphylinidae
- Genus: Centrotoma
- Species: C. szeptyckii

Binomial name
- Centrotoma szeptyckii Löbl, 1974

Species of beetle

Centrotoma szeptyckii is a species of ant-loving beetle in the family Staphylinidae.

The species was first described in 1974 by Ivan Löbl. and is endemic to North Korea.
