= Ctenisis =

Scientific classification
- Kingdom: Animalia
- Phylum: Arthropoda
- Class: Insecta
- Order: Coleoptera
- Suborder: Polyphaga
- Infraorder: Staphyliniformia
- Family: Staphylinidae
- Tribe: Ctenistini
- Genus: Ctenisis; Raffray, 1890

Genus of beetles

Ctenisis is a genus of ant-loving beetles in the family Staphylinidae. There are at least two described species in Ctenisis.

== Species ==
These two species belong to the genus Ctenisis:

- Ctenisis phylanderi Chandler, 2003
- Ctenisis raffrayi Casey, 1894
