= Ctenisodes =

Scientific classification
- Kingdom: Animalia
- Phylum: Arthropoda
- Class: Insecta
- Order: Coleoptera
- Suborder: Polyphaga
- Infraorder: Staphyliniformia
- Family: Staphylinidae
- Subfamily: Pselaphinae
- Supertribe: Pselaphitae
- Tribe: Ctenistini
- Genus: Ctenisodes; Raffray, 1897

Synonyms
- Pilopius Casey, 1897

Genus of beetles

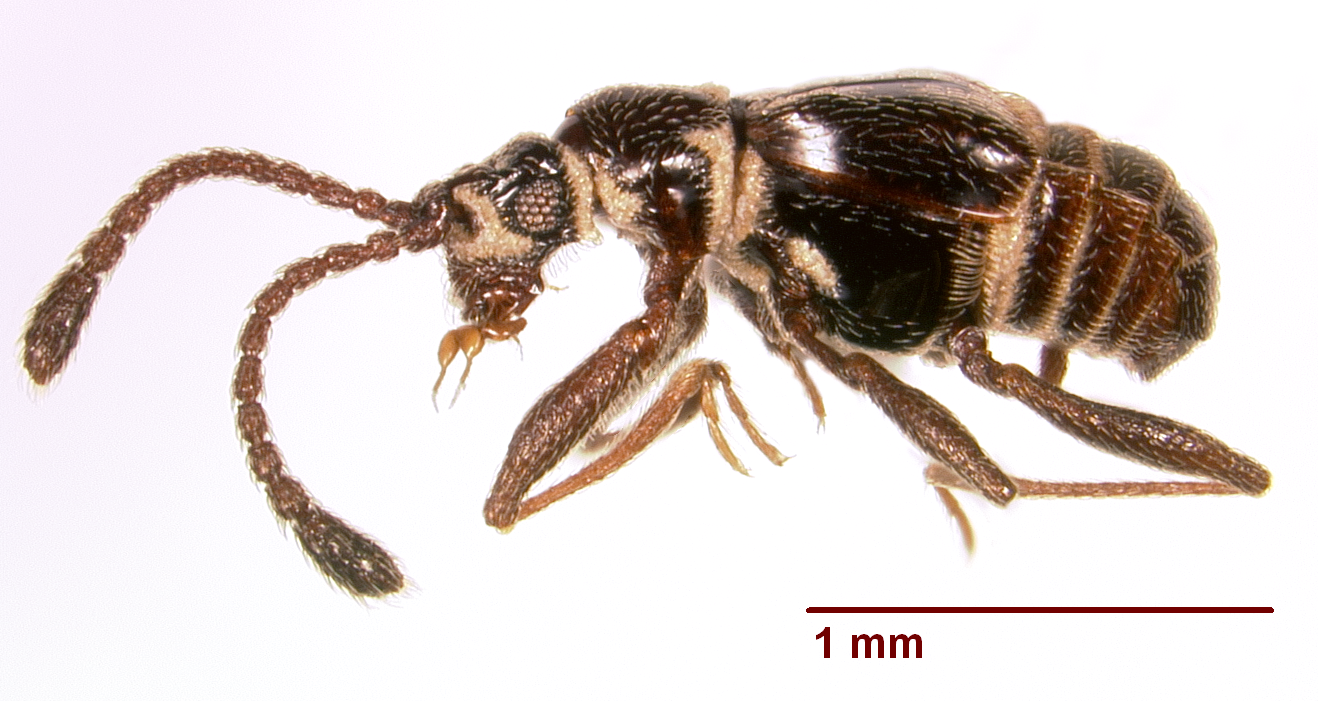
Ctenisodes

Ctenisodes is a genus of ant-loving beetles in the family Staphylinidae. There are about 14 described species in Ctenisodes.

== Species ==
These 14 species belong to the genus Ctenisodes:

- Ctenisodes abruptus (Casey, 1894)
- Ctenisodes cinderella (Casey, 1897)
- Ctenisodes consobrinus (LeConte, 1849)
- Ctenisodes floridanus (Casey, 1897)
- Ctenisodes georgianus (Casey, 1897)
- Ctenisodes granicollis (Casey, 1897)
- Ctenisodes impressipennis (Casey, 1897)
- Ctenisodes iowensis (Casey, 1897)
- Ctenisodes lacustris (Casey, 1897)
- Ctenisodes ocularis (Casey, 1894)
- Ctenisodes piceus (LeConte, 1849)
- Ctenisodes pulvereus (LeConte, 1851)
- Ctenisodes saginatus (Casey, 1897)
- Ctenisodes zimmermanni (LeConte, 1849)
