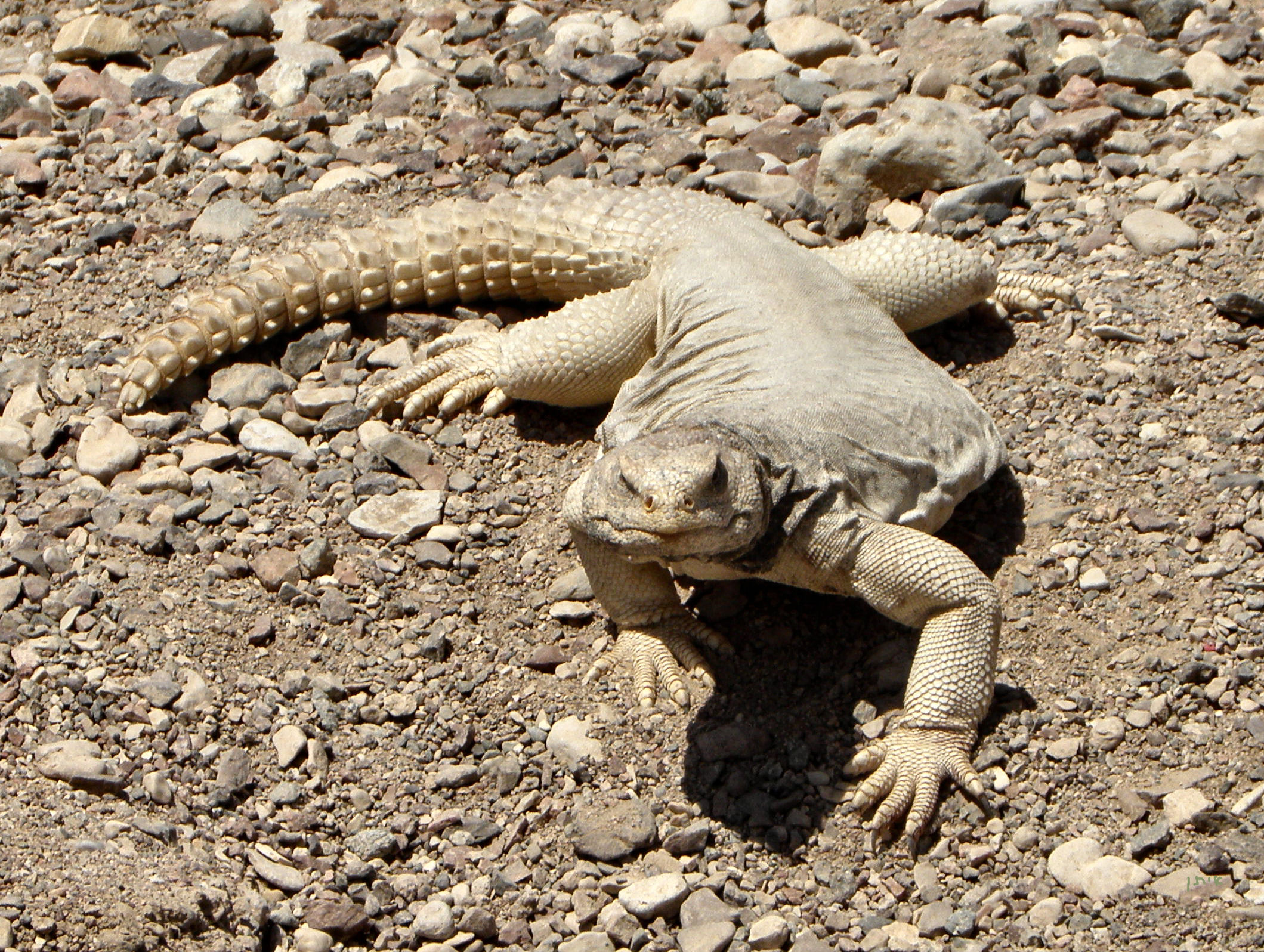
- Egyptian spiny-tailed lizard (Uromastyx aegyptia)

Scientific classification
- Kingdom: Animalia
- Phylum: Chordata
- Class: Reptilia
- Order: Squamata
- Suborder: Iguania
- Family: Agamidae
- Subfamily: Uromasticinae
- Genus: Uromastyx; Merrem, 1820

Species
- See text

Synonyms
- Jeddaherdan

= Uromastyx =

Genus of lizards

Uromastyx is a genus of lizards in the family Agamidae. The genus is native to Africa and the Middle East (West Asia). Members of the species are commonly called spiny-tailed lizards, uromastyces, mastigures, or dabb lizards.

Lizards in the genus Uromastyx are primarily herbivorous, but occasionally eat insects and other small animals, especially young lizards. They spend most of their waking hours basking in the sun, hiding in underground chambers at nighttime or when danger appears. They tend to establish themselves in hilly, rocky areas with good shelter and accessible vegetation.

== Taxonomy ==
The generic name Uromastyx is derived from the Ancient Greek words οὐρά (ourá), meaning "tail", and μάστιξ (mástix), meaning "whip" or "scourge", after the thick-spiked tail characteristic of all Uromastyx species.

=== Species ===
The following species are in the genus Uromastyx. Three additional species were formerly placed in this genus, but have been moved to their own genus, Saara.

Image	Scientific name	Common name	Distribution
	Uromastyx acanthinura Bell, 1825	North African mastigure, North African spiny-tailed lizard	Morocco, Algeria, Tunisia, Libya, Egypt, Western Sahara, Chad, Mali, Niger, and Sudan
	Uromastyx aegyptia (Forskål, 1775)	Egyptian mastigure, Egyptian spiny-tailed lizard	Egypt, Israel and the Arabian peninsula.
	Uromastyx alfredschmidti Wilms & Böhme, 2001	ebony mastigure, Schmidt's mastigure, Schmidt's spiny-tailed lizard	Algeria and Libya. The spiny tail of the Uromastyx serves as a defense mechanism, which the lizard swings at predators to protect itself. The tail’s spines can inflict damage, making it an effective tool for deterring threats
	Uromastyx benti (J. Anderson, 1894)	Bent's mastigure, Yemeni spiny-tailed lizard	Oman and Yemen.
	Uromastyx dispar Heyden, 1827	Sudan mastigure	Mauritania, Sudan, Chad, Western Sahara, Algeria, and Mali.
	Uromastyx geyri (L. Müller, 1922)	Geyr's dabb lizard, Geyr's spiny-tailed lizard, Sahara mastigure, Saharan spiny-tailed lizard, Saharan yellow uromastyx, yellow Niger uromastyx	Algeria, Mali, and Niger.
	Uromastyx macfadyeni H. Parker, 1932	Macfadyen's mastigure	Somalia
	Uromastyx nigriventris Rothschild & Hartert, 1912	Moroccan spiny-tailed lizard	Morocco and Algeria.
	Uromastyx occidentalis Mateo, Geniez, López-Jurado & Bons, 1999		Western Sahara
	Uromastyx ocellata Lichtenstein, 1823	ocellated spinytail, eyed dabb lizard, ocellated uromastyx	southern Egypt, Sudan, Eritrea, Djibouti, Ethiopia (near the Somali border), and northwestern Somalia
	Uromastyx ornata Heyden, 1827	ornate mastigure	Egypt, Southern Israel, Saudi Arabia, and Yemen
	Uromastyx princeps O’Shaughnessy, 1880	princely spiny-tailed lizard, princely mastigure, Somalian mastigure	Somalia, Ethiopia
	Uromastyx shobraki Wilms & Schmitz, 2007		Yemen
	Uromastyx thomasi H. Parker, 1930	Omani spiny-tailed lizard, Thomas's mastigure	Oman
	Uromastyx yemenensis Wilms & Schmitz, 2007	South Arabian spiny-tailed lizard	Yemen

Nota bene: A binomial authority in parentheses indicates that the species was originally described in a genus other than Uromastyx.

== Description ==
Uromastyx species range in size from 25 cm (10 in) for U. macfadyeni to 91 cm (36 in) or more for U. aegyptia. Hatchlings or neonates are usually no more than 7–10 cm (3–4 in) in length. Like many reptiles, these lizards' colors change according to the temperature and season. During cool weather they appear dull and dark, but the colors become lighter in warm weather, especially when basking. The darker pigmentation allows their skin to absorb sunlight more effectively.

Their spiked tail is muscular and heavy, and is able to be swung at an attacker with great velocity, usually accompanied by hissing and an open-mouthed display of (small) teeth. Uromastyx generally sleep in their burrows with their tails closest to the opening, in order to thwart intruders.

== Distribution ==
Uromastyx inhabit a range stretching through most of North and Northeast Africa, the Middle East, ranging as far east as Iran. Species found further east are now placed in the genus Saara. Uromastyx occur at elevations from sea level to well over 900 m (3,000 ft). They are regularly eaten, and sold in produce markets, by local peoples.

== Diet ==
Uromastyx lizards acquire most of the water they need from the vegetation they ingest. In the wild they generally eat any surrounding vegetation. When hatching, baby Uromastyx eat their own mother's feces as their first meal before heading off to find a more sustainable food source. They do this to establish a proper gut flora, essential for digesting the plants that they eat.

In the wild, adult U. dispar maliensis have been reported to eat insects at certain times of the year, when it is hot and their only food source available would be insects.

== Reproduction ==
A female Uromastyx can lay anywhere from 5 to 40 eggs, depending on age and species. Eggs are laid approximately 30 days following copulation with an incubation time of 70–80 days. The neonates weigh 4–6 g (0.14–0.21 oz) and are about 5 cm (2 in) snout to vent length. They rapidly gain weight during the first few weeks following hatching.

A field study in Algeria concluded that Moroccan spiny-tailed lizards add approximately 5 cm (2 in) of total growth each year until around the age of 8–9 years.

Wild female Uromastyx are smaller and less colorful than males. For example, U. dispar maliensis females are often light tan with black dorsal spots, while males are mostly bright yellow with mottled black markings. Females also tend to have shorter claws. In captivity female U. dispar maliensis tend to mimic males in color. U. dispar maliensis are, therefore, reputably difficult to breed in captivity.

== Relationship with humans ==
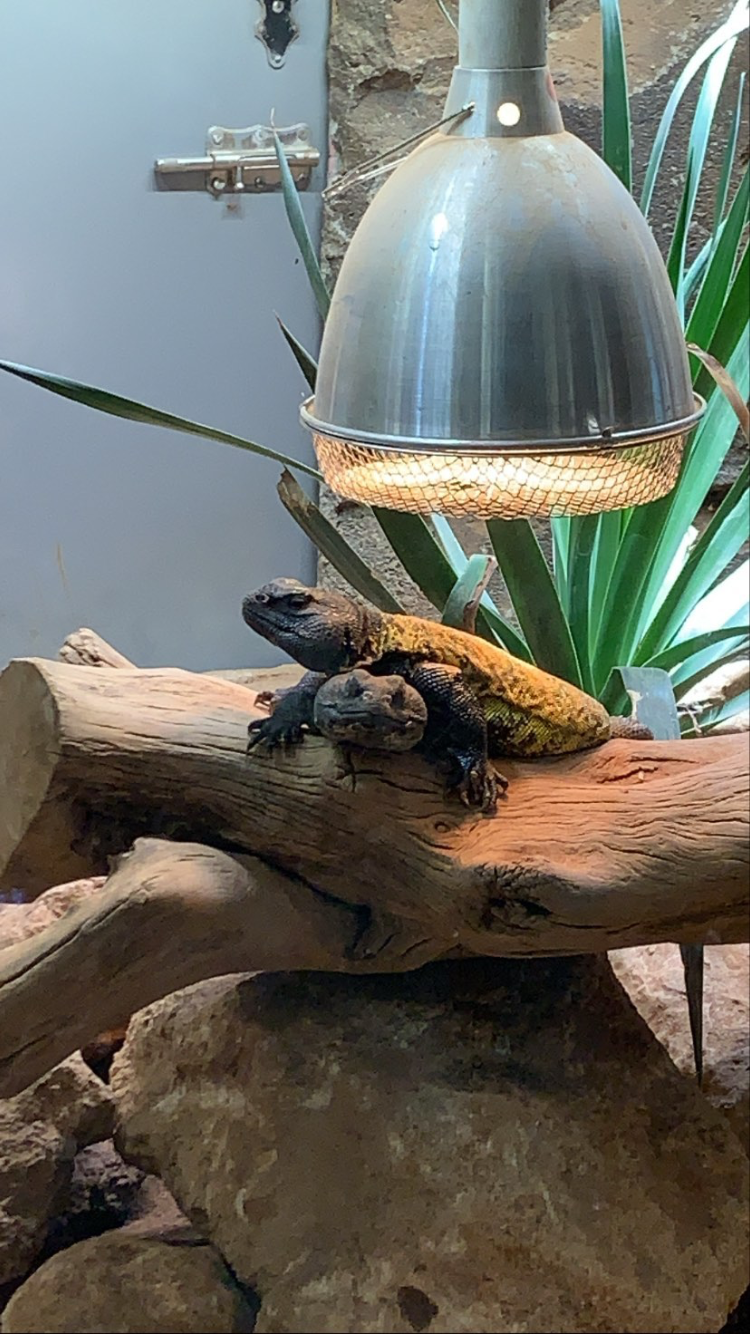
Pair of captive Uromastyx

=== Captivity ===
Uromastyx are removed from the wild in an unregulated manner for the pet and medicinal trade in Morocco, despite their protected status in the country; conditions of the animals while being sold is often extremely poor and overcrowding is common. Historically, captive Uromastyx had a poor survival rate, due to a lack of understanding of their dietary and environmental needs. In recent years, knowledge has significantly increased, and appropriate diet and care has led to survival rates and longevity approaching and perhaps surpassing those in the wild. With good care, they are capable of living for over 25 years, and possibly as old as 60.

=== Consumption by humans ===
U. dispar maliensis, known as "ḍabb" (Arabic: ضَـبْ) by peninsular Arabs, is historically consumed as food by some of the Bedouin population of the Arabian peninsula, mainly those residing in the interior and eastern regions of Arabia. This lizard used to be considered an "Arabian delicacy". It is recorded that when an Uromastyx was brought to the Islamic prophet Muhammad by Bedouins, Muhammad did not eat the lizard, but Muslims were not prohibited by him from consuming it; thus Muhammad's companion Khalid bin Walid consumed the lizard.

In Judaism, this lizard is traditionally identified as the biblical tzav, one of the eight "creeping" animals forbidden for consumption that impart ritual impurity. The Torah states: "The following shall be impure for you among the creeping animals that swarm upon the earth: The weasel, and the mouse, and the dab lizard (tzav) of every variety; and the gecko, and the land-crocodile, and the lizard, and the skink, and the chameleon" (Leviticus 11:29–30).

== See also ==
- Animals in Islam
