= James Theodore Bent =

Explorer, archaeologist and author (1852–1897)

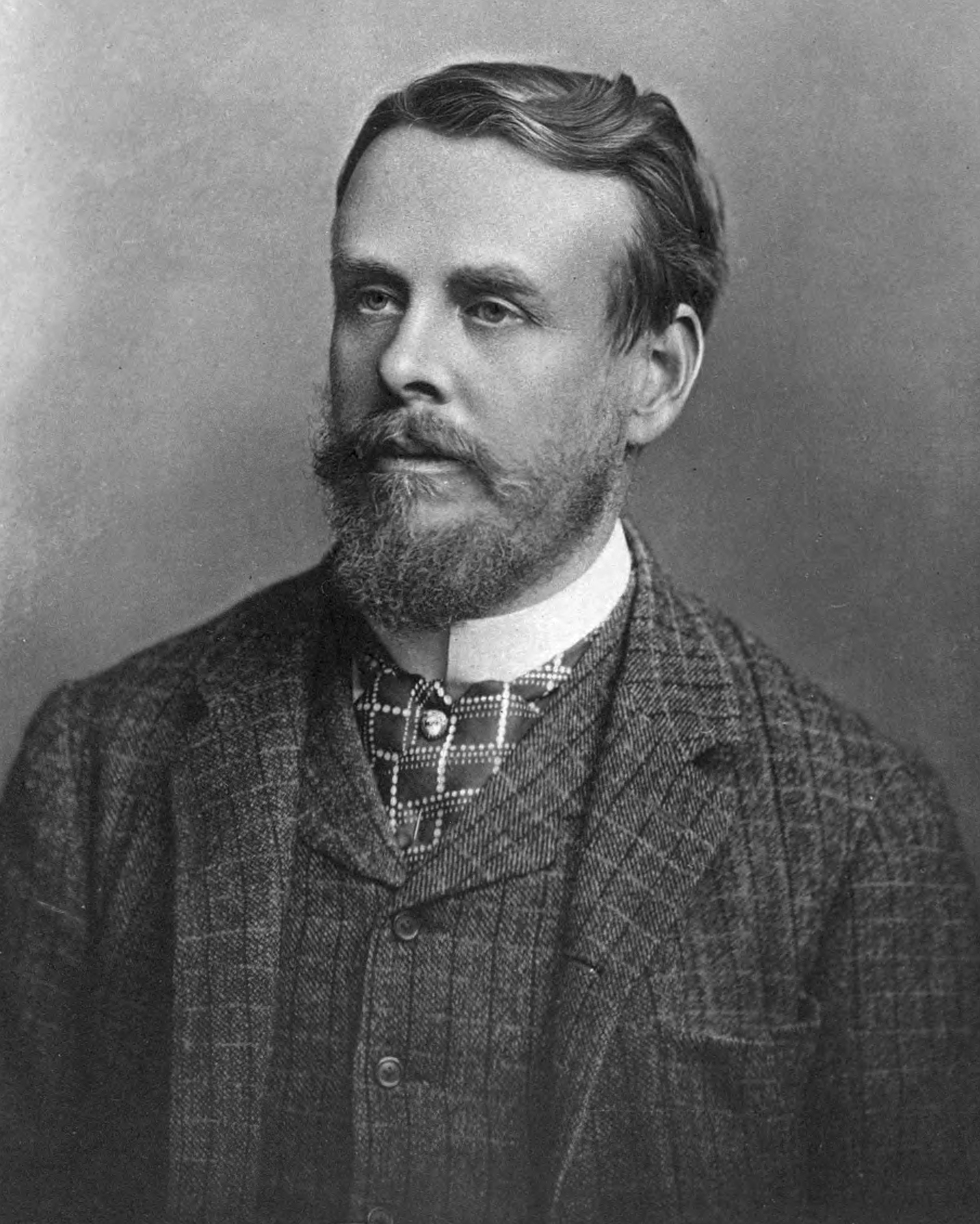
- Born: 30 March 1852; Liverpool, England
- Died: 5 May 1897 (aged 45); London, England

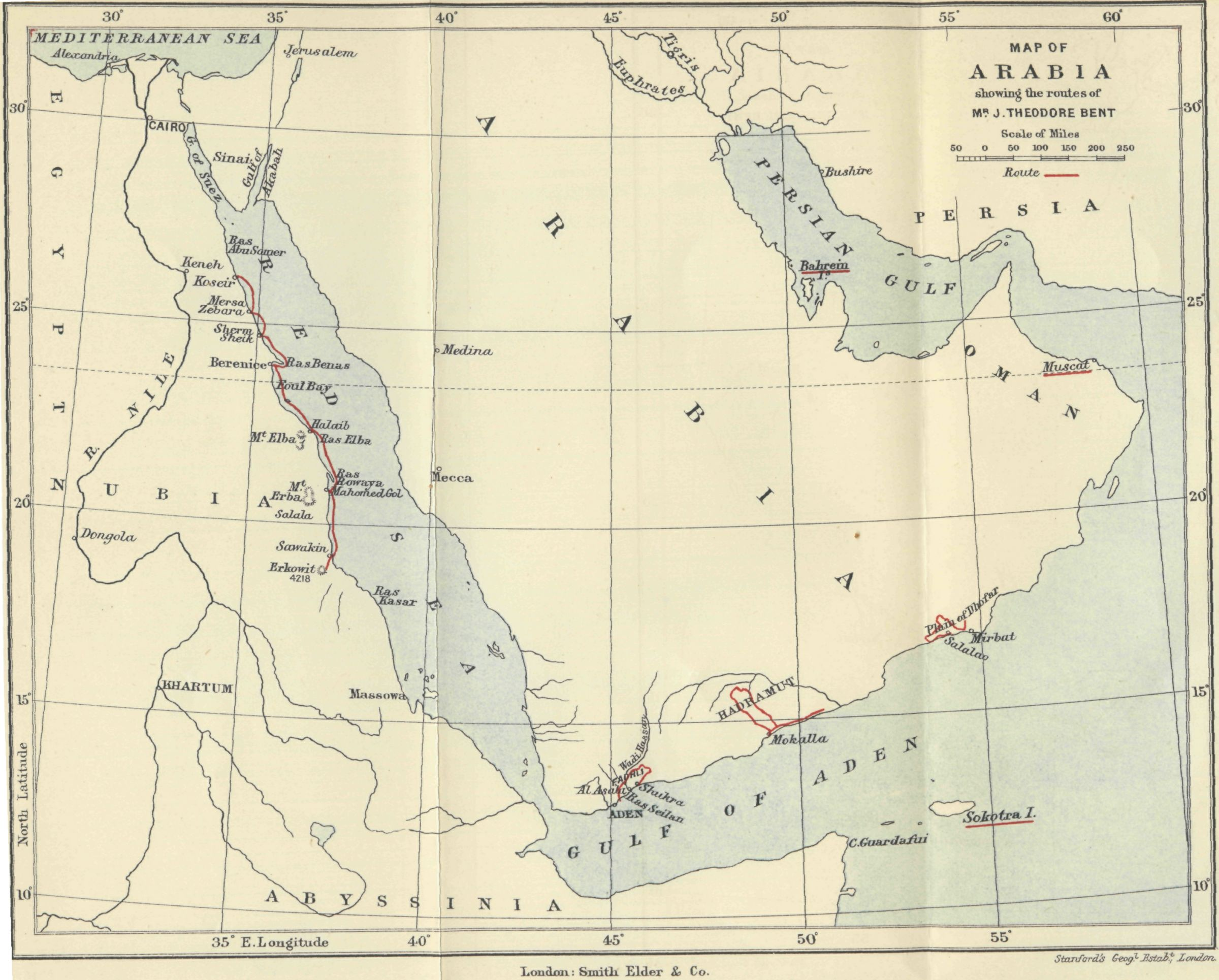
Map of Arabia showing routes of Theodore Bent.

James Theodore Bent (30 March 1852 – 5 May 1897) was an English explorer, archaeologist, and author.

== Biography ==
James Theodore Bent was born in Liverpool on 30 March 1852, the son of James (1807-1876) and Eleanor (née Lambert, c.1811-1873) Bent of Baildon House, Baildon, near Bradford, Yorkshire, where Bent lived in his boyhood. He was educated at Malvern Wells preparatory school, Repton School, and Wadham College, Oxford, where he graduated in 1875. His paternal grandparents were William (1769-1820) and Sarah (née Gorton) Bent; it was this William Bent who founded Bent's Breweries, a successful business which, in various guises, was still in existence into the 1970s, and which helped generate the family's wealth. One of Bent's uncles, Sir John Bent, the brewer, was Liverpool mayor in 1850–51.

In 1877, Bent married Mabel Hall-Dare (1847-1929) who became his collaborator and companion on all his travels, contributing to his academic work through her photography and diaries. From the time of their marriage, they went abroad nearly every year, beginning with extended travels in Italy and Greece. In 1879, he published a book on the republic of San Marino, entitled A Freak of Freedom, and was made a citizen of San Marino; in the following year appeared Genoa: How the Republic Rose and Fell, and in 1881 a Life of Giuseppe Garibaldi. The couple's researches in the Aegean archipelago over the winters of 1882/3 and 1883/4 culminated in Bent's The Cyclades; or, Life among the Insular Greeks (1885).

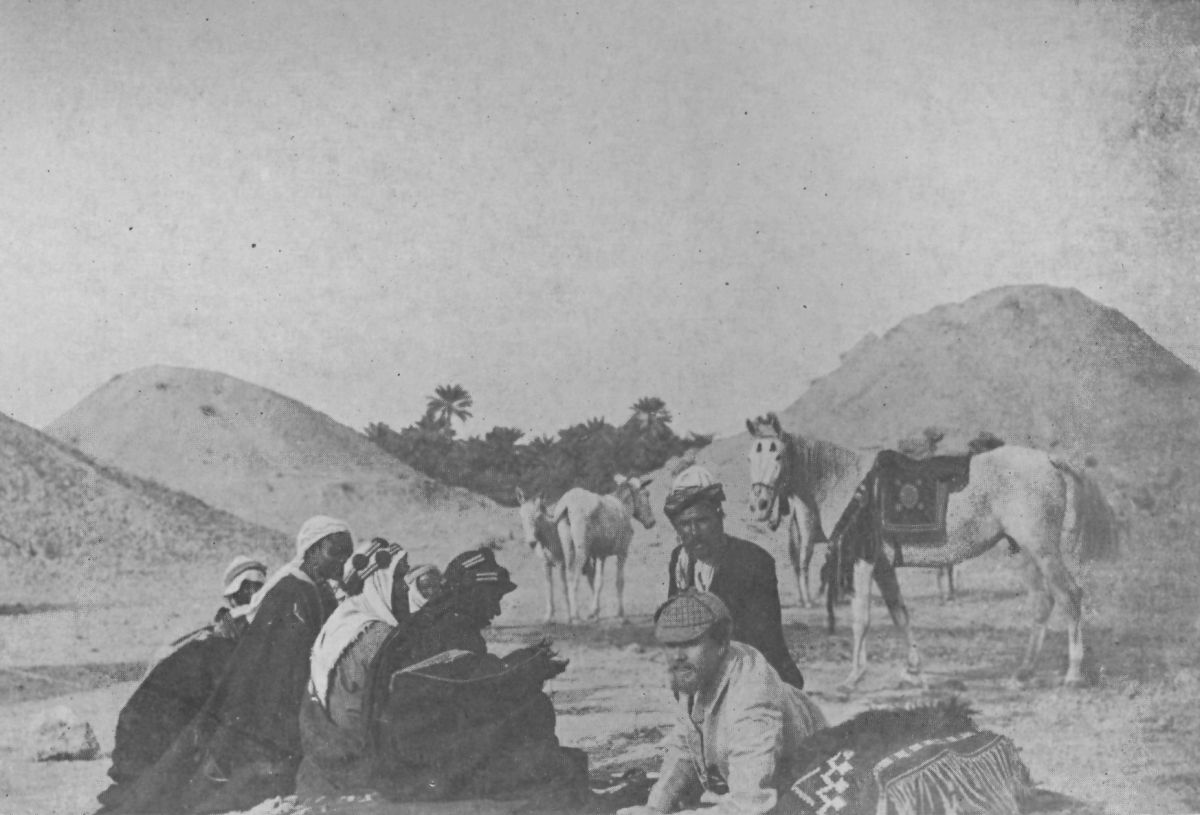
Theodore Bent receiving visitors at the Dilmun burial mounds in Bahrain.

At the time of Bent's death in 1897, the couple resided at 13 Great Cumberland Place, London, and Sutton Hall, outside Macclesfield, Cheshire, UK.

== Archaeological research ==
From this period Bent concentrated particularly on archaeological and ethnographic research. The years 1883-1888 were devoted to investigations in the Eastern Mediterranean and Anatolia, his discoveries and conclusions being communicated to the Journal of Hellenic Studies and other magazines and reviews; his investigations on the Cycladic island of Antiparos are of note. In 1889, he undertook excavations in the Bahrein Islands of the Persian Gulf, looking for evidence that they had been a primitive home of the Phoenician civilization; he and his wife returned to England via Persia (Iran), being introduced to Shah Naser al-Din Shah Qajar along the way. After an expedition in 1890 to Cilicia Trachea, where he obtained a valuable collection of inscriptions, Bent spent a year in South Africa, with the object, by investigation of some of the ruins in Mashonaland, of throwing light on the vexed question of their origin and on the early history of East Africa. Bent believed the Zimbabwe ruins had originally been built by the ancestors of the Shona people. To this end, in 1891, he made, along with his wife and the Glaswegian surveyor Robert McNair Wilson Swan (1858-1904), a colleague from Bent's time on Antiparos in 1883/4, the first detailed examination of the Great Zimbabwe. Bent described his work in The Ruined Cities of Mashonaland (1892). Famously, Victor Loret and Alfred Charles Auguste Foucher denounced this view, and claimed that a non-African culture built the original structures. Modern archaeologists now agree that the city was the product of a Shona-speaking African civilization.

In 1893, he investigated the ruins of Axum and other places in northern Ethiopia, which had previously been made known in part by the researches of Henry Salt and others. His book The Sacred City of the Ethiopians (1893) gives an account of this expedition.

Bent now visited at considerable risk the almost unknown Hadramut country (1893–1894), and during this and later journeys in southern Arabia he studied the ancient history of the country, its physical features and actual condition. On the Dhofar coast in 1894-1895, he visited ruins which he identified with the Abyssapolis of the frankincense merchants. In 1895-1896, he examined part of the African coast of the Red Sea, finding there the ruins of a very ancient gold-mine and traces of what he considered Sabaean influence. While on another journey in South Arabia and Socotra (1896–1897), Bent was seized with malarial fever, and died in London on 5 May 1897, a few days after his return.

Mabel Bent, who had contributed by her skill as a photographer and in other ways to the success of her husband's journeys, published in 1900 Southern Arabia, Soudan and Sakotra, which she recorded the results of their last expedition into those regions.

== Collections ==
The majority of Bent's collections (hundreds of artefacts but relatively few on display) is to be found in the British Museum, London. Smaller collections are kept at: The Pitt Rivers Museum, Oxford, UK; The Victorian and Albert Museum, London, UK; Royal Botanic Garden, Kew, London, UK; The Natural History Museum, London, UK; Sulgrave Manor, Banbury, UK; Harris Museum and Art Gallery, Preston, UK. Overseas: The Benaki Museum, Athens, Greece; The Archaeological Museum, Istanbul, Turkey; The South African Museum, Cape Town, South Africa; The Great Zimbabwe Museum, Masvingo, Zimbabwe. Some manuscripts are archived at The Royal Geographical Society, London, UK; The Hellenic and Roman Library, Senate House, London, UK; The British Library, London, UK.

== Legacy ==
The Natural History Museum, London, has small collections of shells and insects the Bents returned with in the 1890s. Some shells carry the Bent name today (e.g. Lithidion bentii and Buliminus bentii). Several plants and seeds the Bents brought back from Southern Arabia are now in the Herbarium at Kew Gardens; one such specimen being Echidnopsis Bentii, collected on his last journey in 1897. Bent is also commemorated in the scientific name of a species of Arabian lizard, Uromastyx benti.

Some of Bent’s original notebooks held in the archive of the Hellenic Society, London, and unpublished, have now been digitized and are available on open access.

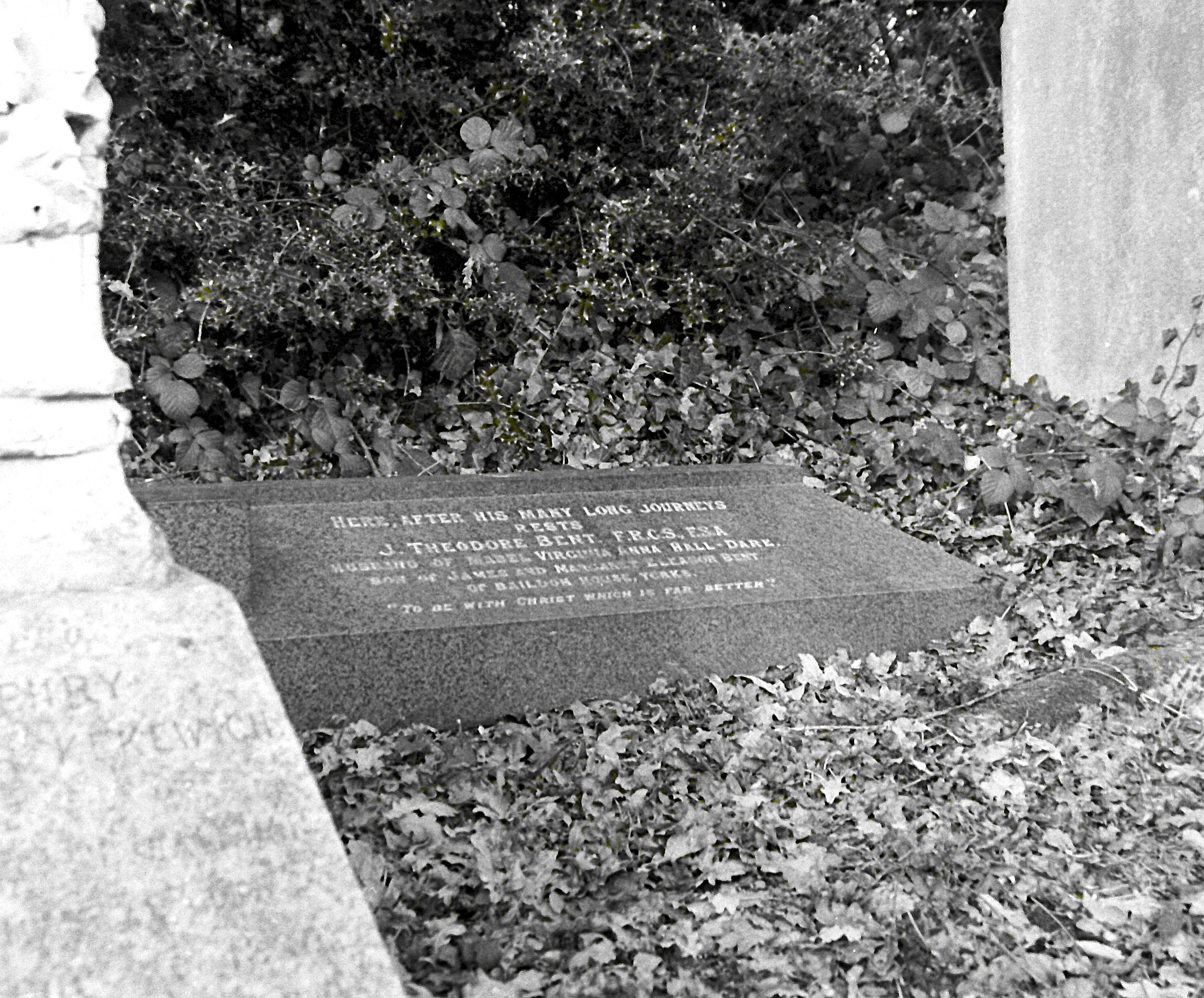
Theodore and Mabel Bent share a grave and memorial (centre) in the churchyard of St Mary’s, Theydon Bois, Essex, UK.

Theodore and Mabel Bent share a grave and memorial (right) in the churchyard of St Mary’s, Theydon Bois, Essex, UK. The inscription reads: ‘Here, after his many long journeys rests J. Theodore Bent, FRGS, FSA, husband of Mabel Virginia Anna Hall-Dare, son of James and Margaret Eleanor Bent of Baildon House, Yorks. “To be with Christ which is far better.”’ The red granite memorial has been moved from its original location within the Hall Dare section of the cemetery.
