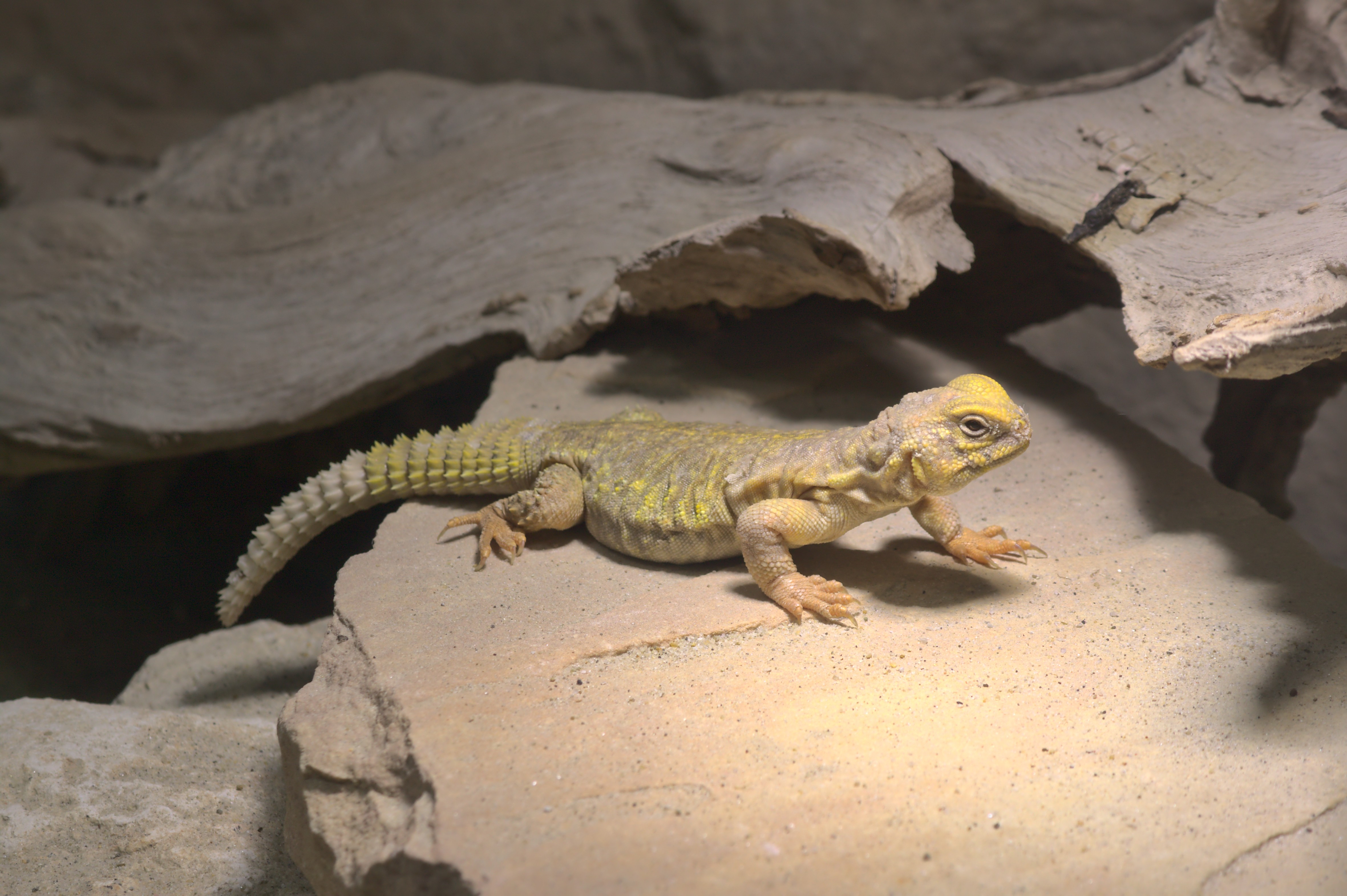
- Uromastyx geyri, Saharan Uromastyx

Conservation status
- Near Threatened (IUCN 3.1)
- CITES Appendix II

Scientific classification
- Kingdom: Animalia
- Phylum: Chordata
- Class: Reptilia
- Order: Squamata
- Suborder: Iguania
- Family: Agamidae
- Genus: Uromastyx
- Species: U. geyri

Binomial name
- Uromastyx geyri (L. Müller, 1922)

Synonyms
- Uromastix geyri L. Müller, 1922; Uromastyx acanthinurus geyri — Mertens, 1962; Uromastyx geyri — Wilms & Böhme, 2001

= Uromastyx geyri =

Species of lizard

Uromastyx geyri is a species of lizard belonging to the family Agamidae. The species is native to North Africa.

== Common names ==
Common names for U. geyri include Geyr's dabb lizard, Geyr's spiny-tailed lizard, the Sahara mastigure, the Saharan spiny-tailed lizard, the Saharan yellow uromastyx, and the yellow Niger uromastyx.

== Geographic range ==
U. geyri is found in parts of Algeria, Mali, and Niger.

== Habitat ==
The preferred natural habitat of U. geyri is rocky desert, at altitudes of 500–2,000 m (1,600–6,600 ft).

== Etymology ==
The generic name, Uromastyx, is derived from the Ancient Greek words ourá (οὐρά) meaning "tail" and mastiga (μαστίγα) meaning "whip" or "scourge", after the thick-spiked tail characteristic of all Uromastyx species.

The specific name, geyri, is in honor of German zoologist Hans Geyr von Schweppenburg.

== Description ==
U. geyri is a relatively small, slender species for the genus, with an average total length (including tail) of around 34 cm (13 in). This lizard is usually beige or orange with lighter spots. It is one of the brightest-colored species of the genus Uromastyx. There are two phases of U. geyri, the "red" geyri and "yellow" geyri, color being their only difference. The red phase is often nearly solid reddish to neon pumpkin orange, and the yellow phase is in or near a neon-range. Females are a more pale color than the males, showing more tan variations of the coloring and much less belly coloring as well as less vivid patterns, most females having a simple "freckling" on the back. "Saharans" are medium-sized lizards, many averaging 11–14 in (28–36 cm) in total length, and weighing 250 grams (8.8 oz) or more as adults.

== Behavior ==
U. geyri is terrestrial and diurnal.

== Diet ==
U. geyri is predominately herbivorous.

== Reproduction ==
U. geyri is oviparous. An adult female may lay a clutch of as many as 20 eggs.

== Gallery ==
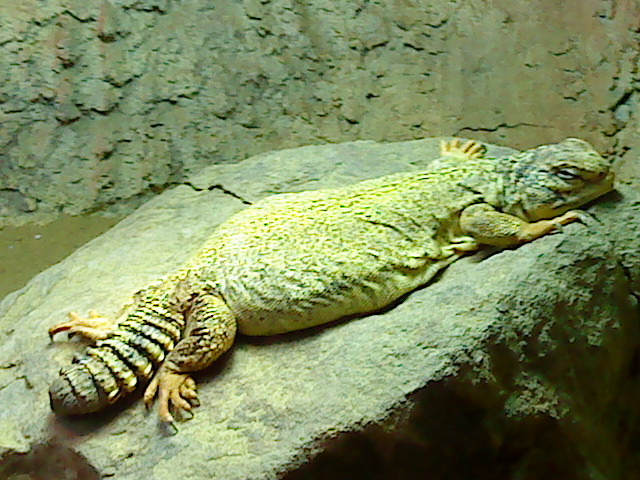
Stratford-upon-Avon Butterfly Centre, UK

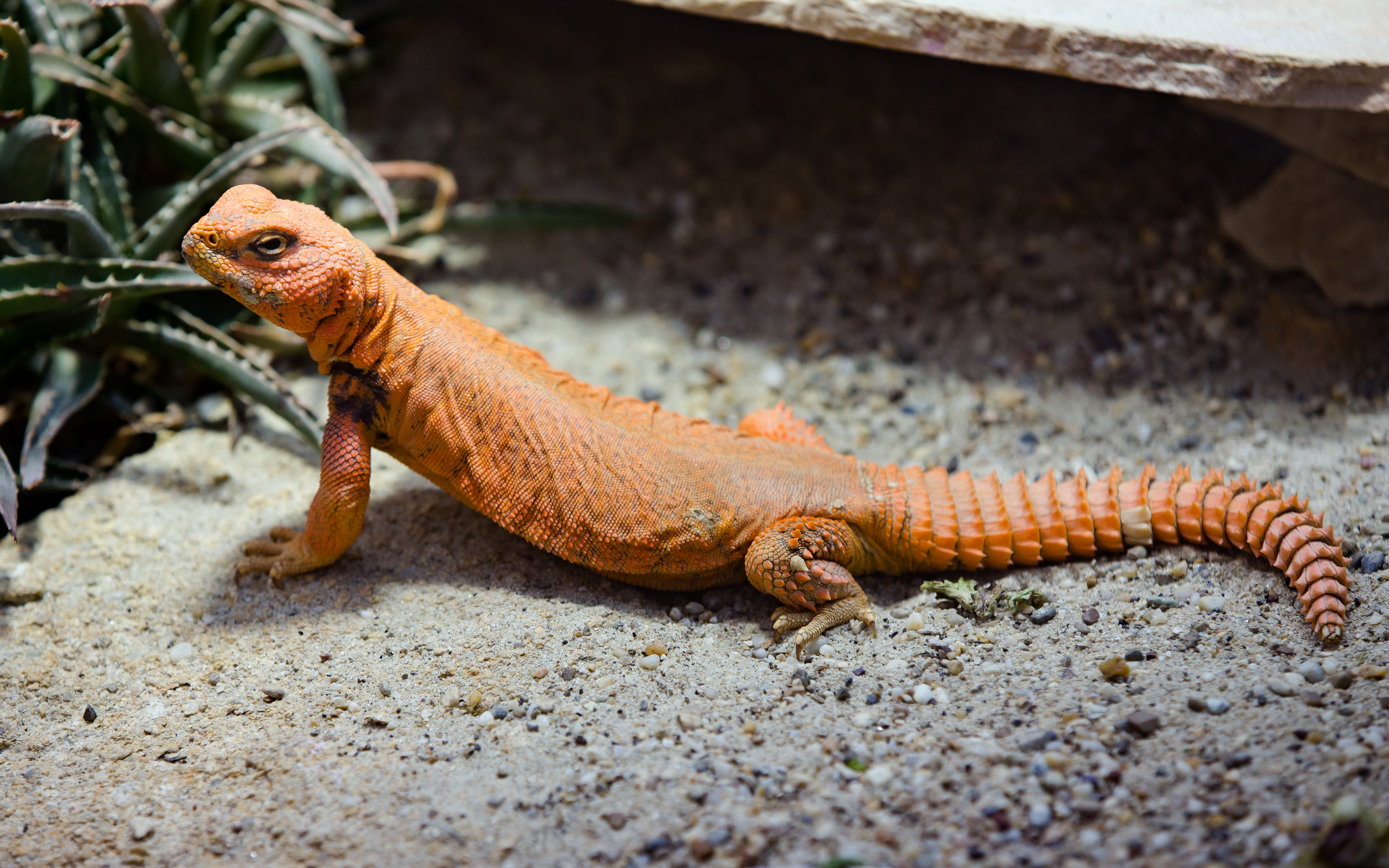
Blumengärten Hirschstetten, Vienna, Austria
