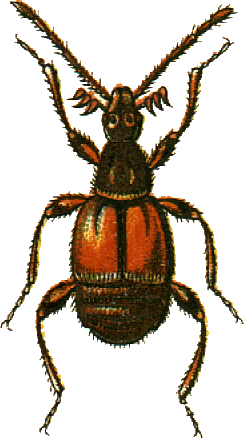
- Ctenistes palpalis

Scientific classification
- Kingdom: Animalia
- Phylum: Arthropoda
- Class: Insecta
- Order: Coleoptera
- Suborder: Polyphaga
- Infraorder: Staphyliniformia
- Family: Staphylinidae
- Supertribe: Pselaphitae
- Tribe: Ctenistini; Blanchard, 1845

= Ctenistini =

Tribe of beetles

Ctenistini is a tribe of ant-loving beetles in the family Staphylinidae. There are at least four genera and about six described species in Ctenistini.

The tribe was described in 1845 by Blanchard, and the type genus is Ctenistes Reichenbach, 1816.

== Genera ==
These five genera belong to the tribe Ctenistini:

- Atinus Horn, 1868^{i c g b}
- Biotus Casey, 1887^{i c g b}
- Ctenisis Raffray, 1890^{i c g b}
- Ctenisodes Raffray, 1897^{i c g b}
- Centrotoma Heyden, C., 1849 ^{c}

Data sources: i = ITIS, c = Catalogue of Life, g = GBIF, b = Bugguide.net
