= Uromastyx occidentalis =

Conservation status
- CITES Appendix II

Scientific classification
- Kingdom: Animalia
- Phylum: Chordata
- Class: Reptilia
- Order: Squamata
- Suborder: Iguania
- Family: Agamidae
- Genus: Uromastyx
- Species: U. occidentalis

Binomial name
- Uromastyx occidentalis Mateo, Geniez, Lopez-Jurado, & Bons, 1999

Species of lizard

Uromastyx occidentalis is a species of agamid lizard. It is found in the Western Sahara.
