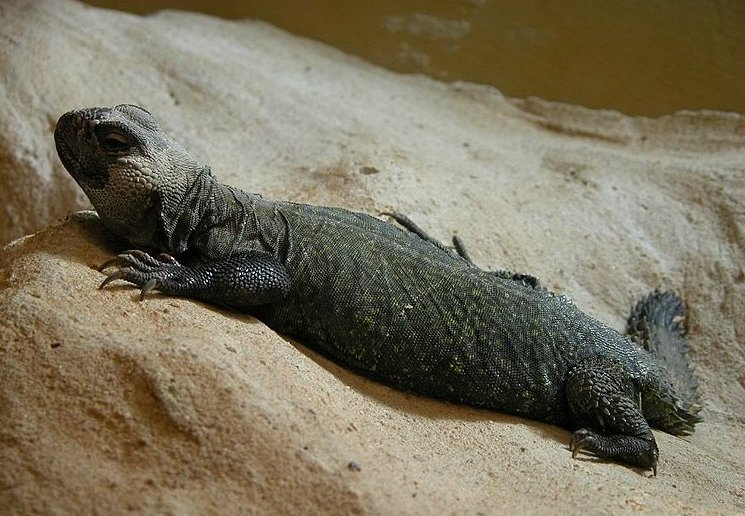

Conservation status
- Near Threatened (IUCN 3.1)

Scientific classification
- Domain: Eukaryota
- Kingdom: Animalia
- Phylum: Chordata
- Class: Reptilia
- Order: Squamata
- Suborder: Iguania
- Family: Agamidae
- Genus: Uromastyx
- Species: U. acanthinura

Binomial name
- Uromastyx acanthinura Bell, 1825

= Uromastyx acanthinura =

Species of lizard

Uromastyx acanthinura, the North African mastigure or North African spiny-tailed lizard, is a species of agamid lizard. It is found in Morocco, Algeria, Tunisia, Libya, Egypt, Western Sahara, Chad, Mali, Niger, and Sudan.
