= Uromastyx yemenensis =

Conservation status
- Near Threatened (IUCN 3.1)
- CITES Appendix II

Scientific classification
- Kingdom: Animalia
- Phylum: Chordata
- Class: Reptilia
- Order: Squamata
- Suborder: Iguania
- Family: Agamidae
- Genus: Uromastyx
- Species: U. yemenensis

Binomial name
- Uromastyx yemenensis Wilms & Schmitz, 2007

Species of lizard

Uromastyx yemenensis, the South Arabian spiny-tailed lizard, is a species of agamid lizard. It is found in Yemen.
