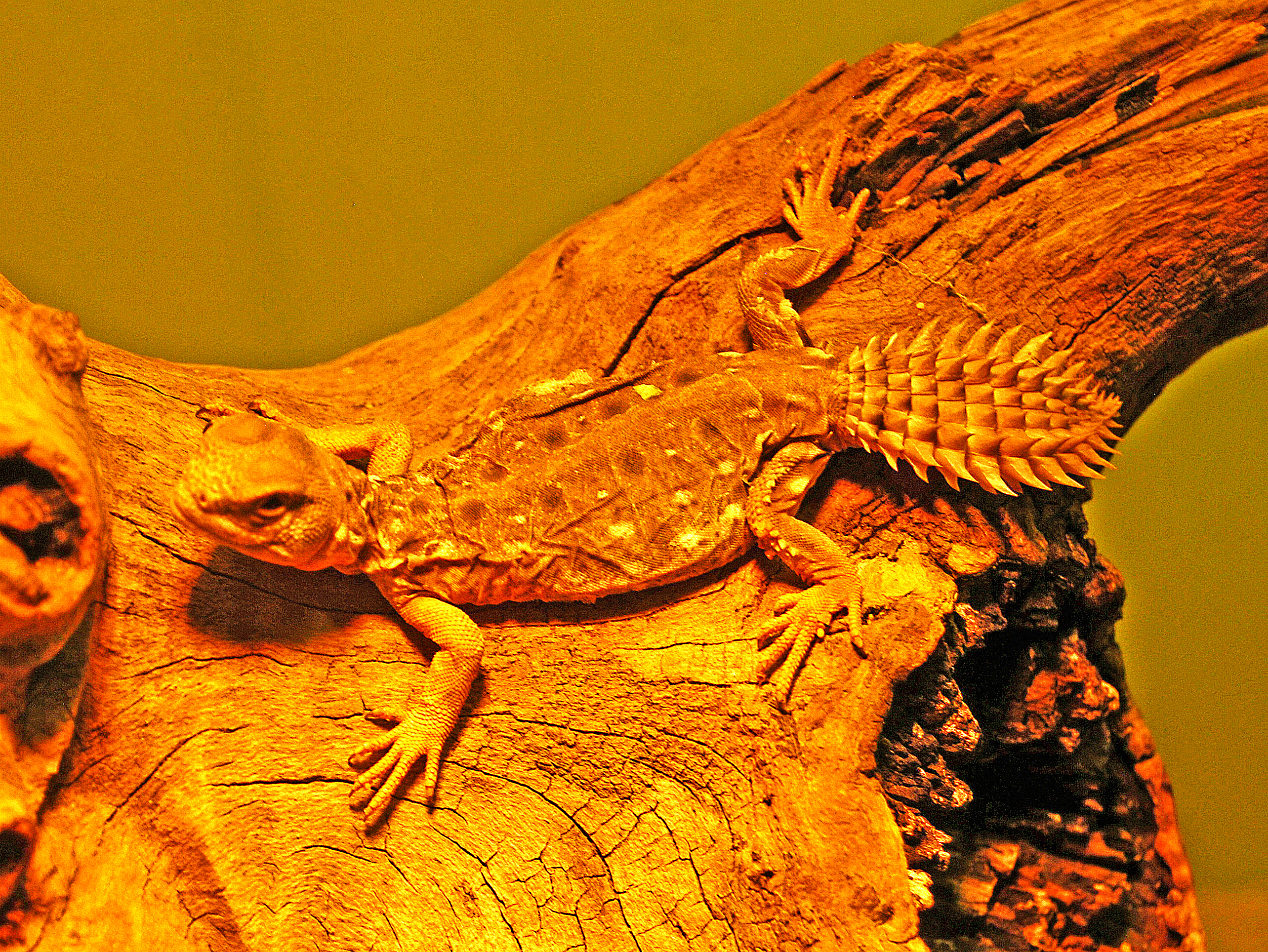

Conservation status
- Least Concern (IUCN 3.1)
- CITES Appendix II

Scientific classification
- Kingdom: Animalia
- Phylum: Chordata
- Class: Reptilia
- Order: Squamata
- Suborder: Iguania
- Family: Agamidae
- Genus: Uromastyx
- Species: U. princeps

Binomial name
- Uromastyx princeps O'Shaugnessy, 1880

Synonyms
- List: Uromastyx princeps O'SHAUGHNESSY 1880; Aporoscelis princeps BOULENGER 1885; Aporoscelis princeps SCORTECCI 1931; Uromastix princeps PARKER 1942; Uromastyx princeps scortecci CHERCHI 1954; Uromastyx princeps WERMUTH 1967; Uromastyx princeps WILMS 2002; Uromastyx princeps WILMS et al. 2009; Uromastyx princeps TAMAR et al. 2017

= Uromastyx princeps =

Species of lizard

Uromastyx princeps, commonly known as the princely mastigure, princely spiny-tailed lizard, or Somalian mastigure, is a species of lizard in the family Agamidae.

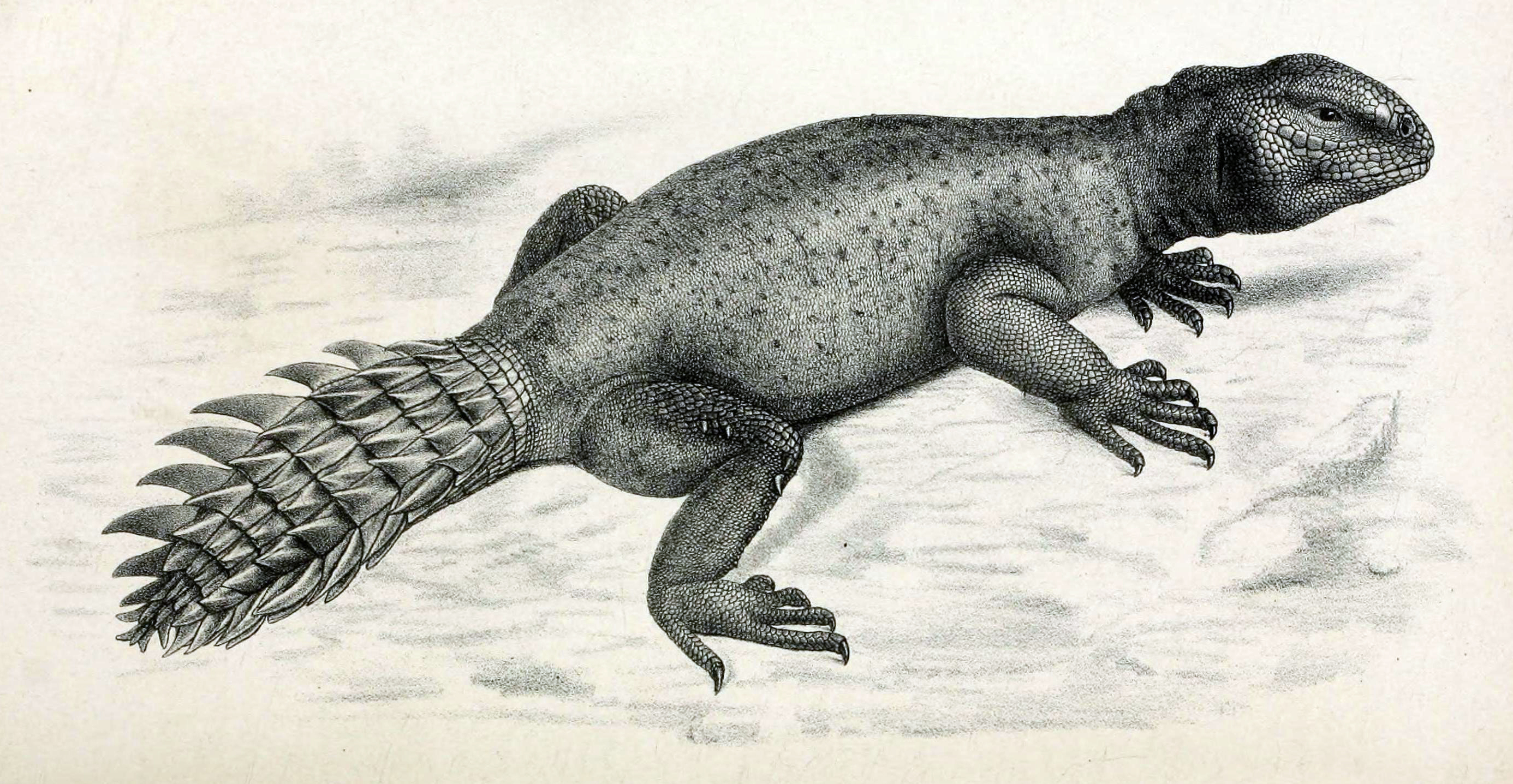
Illustration from Proceedings of the Zoological Society of London (1880)

== Geographic range and habitat ==
The species is endemic to the Horn of Africa. It is not known with certainty from localities outside of Somalia. Probably it could be also present in eastern Ethiopia (Eritrea). It lives in rocky areas of the coastal rocky plateaus of volcanic origin, hiding in the cracks of rocks and crevices between the stones, usually blocking the entrance with the tail.

== Description ==
Uromastix princeps can reach a body length (including the tail) of about 26 cm (10 in). The body color may show various shades of olive-gray, greenish or blue, with small brown spots. In males, the back is brown-red or green with small dark spots, while the belly is yellowish and the tail is gray-green or brick-red. The females are gray-brown with a reddish tinge and small spots on top. Their belly is whitish.

The tail is ellipsoidal and significantly shorter (35–53% of the body length) than in other members of the genus, but it shows longer and sharper spikes arranged in 9–14 whorls. All scales on the upper side of the tail have spikes. The tail can be used as a defense.

== Biology ==
U. princeps is an oviparous lizard. Mating occurs in May–June. Pregnancy lasts about one month. The females lay in July up to 14 eggs. This species feeds almost entirely on flowers, fruits and other plants, but also on insects.

== Bibliography ==
- O'Shaughnessy AWE (1880). "Description of a new Species of Uromastix [sic]". Proc. Zool. Soc. London 1880: 445-446 + Plate XLIII. ("Uromastix [sic] princeps ", new species).
- Boulenger, G.A. (1885) Catalogue of the Lizards in the British Museum (Nat. Hist.) I. Geckonidae, Eublepharidae, Uroplatidae, Pygopodidae, Agamidae., London: 450 pp
- Cherchi, M. A. 1954. una nuova sottospecie di Uromastix princeps O'Schaug. Atti Soc. ital. Sci. nat. Milano 93: 538-544 + 1 plate
- Loveridge, A. (1942), Bull. Mus. comp. Zool., Cambridge, 91: 49, 50, 54, 55
