= Uromastyx macfadyeni =

Conservation status
- Least Concern (IUCN 3.1)
- CITES Appendix II

Scientific classification
- Kingdom: Animalia
- Phylum: Chordata
- Class: Reptilia
- Order: Squamata
- Suborder: Iguania
- Family: Agamidae
- Genus: Uromastyx
- Species: U. macfadyeni

Binomial name
- Uromastyx macfadyeni H. Parker, 1932

Synonyms
- Uromastix [sic] macfadyeni (H.W. Parker, 1932); Uromastyx ocellata macfadyeni H.W.Parker, 1932

Species of lizard

Uromastyx macfadyeni, also known commonly as Macfadyen's mastigure, is a species of lizard in the family Agamidae. The species is endemic to Somalia.

== Etymology ==
The specific name, macfadyeni, is in honor of British geologist William Archibald Macfadyen.

== Habitat ==
The preferred natural habitat of Uromastyx macfadyeni is stony shrubland, at altitudes of 53–500 m (174–1,640 ft).

== Behavior ==
Uromastyx macfadyeni is terrestrial and diurnal. It shelters beneath stones and in crevices of stones.
