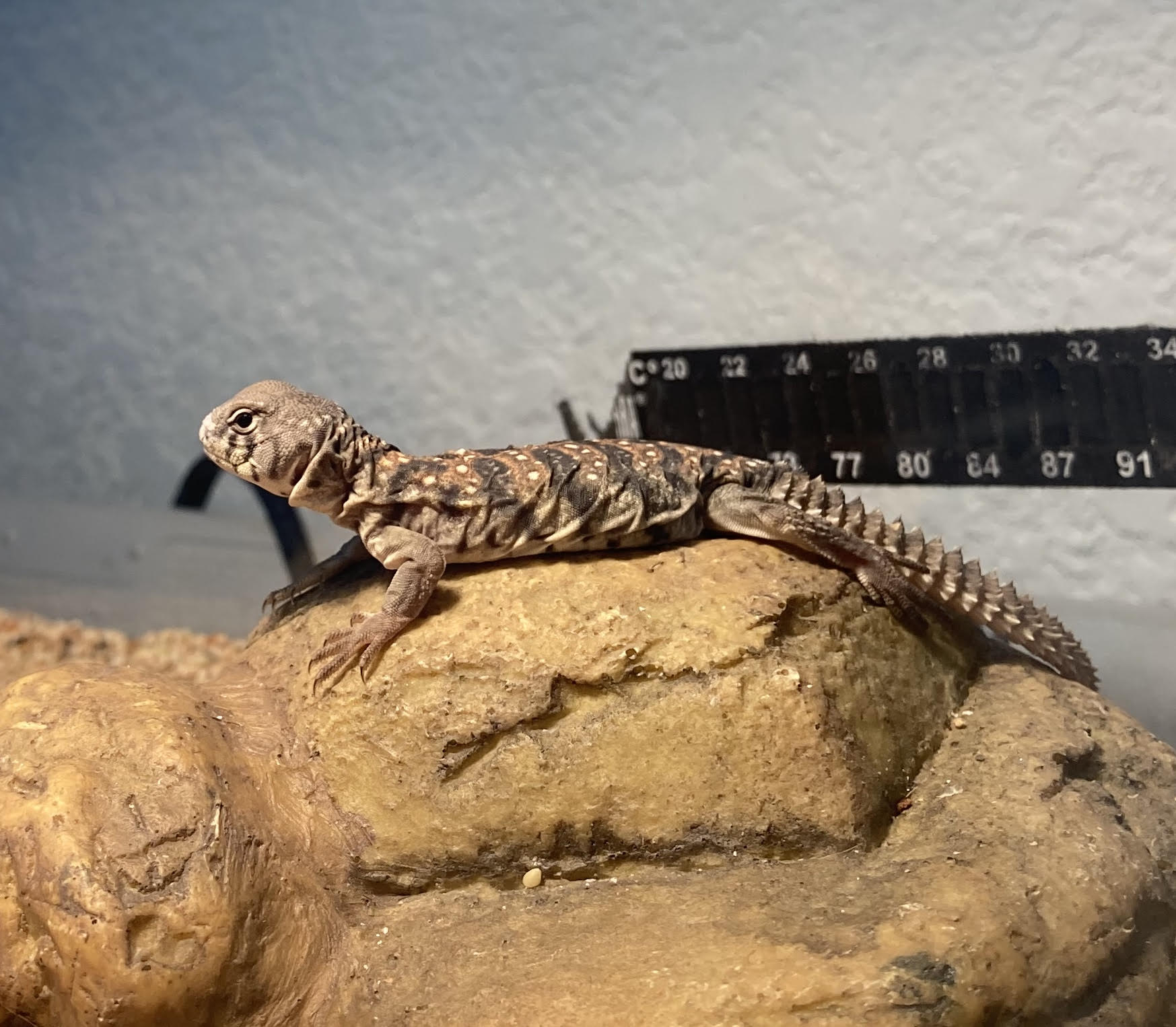

Conservation status
- Least Concern (IUCN 3.1)
- CITES Appendix II (CITES)

Scientific classification
- Kingdom: Animalia
- Phylum: Chordata
- Class: Reptilia
- Order: Squamata
- Suborder: Iguania
- Family: Agamidae
- Genus: Uromastyx
- Species: U. ocellata

Binomial name
- Uromastyx ocellata Lichtenstein, 1823

Synonyms
- Aporoscelis princeps — Scortecci, 1933

= Uromastyx ocellata =

Species of African lizard

Uromastyx ocellata is a species of agamid lizard native to northeastern Africa. It is known as the ocellated spinytail, eyed dabb lizard, and ocellated uromastyx.

== Description ==
Uromastyx ocellata is a medium-small species of Uromastyx, usually weighing 225 g (0.496 lb) and reaching an average length of around 28 cm (11 in). Males usually have a bright blue coloration with yellow and orange spots down their backs while females are usually lighter in coloration, but are typically larger than males.

== Distribution ==
Uromastyx ocellata is native to northeastern Africa, where it can be found in southern Egypt, Sudan, Eritrea, Djibouti, Ethiopia (near the Somali border), and northwestern Somalia.
