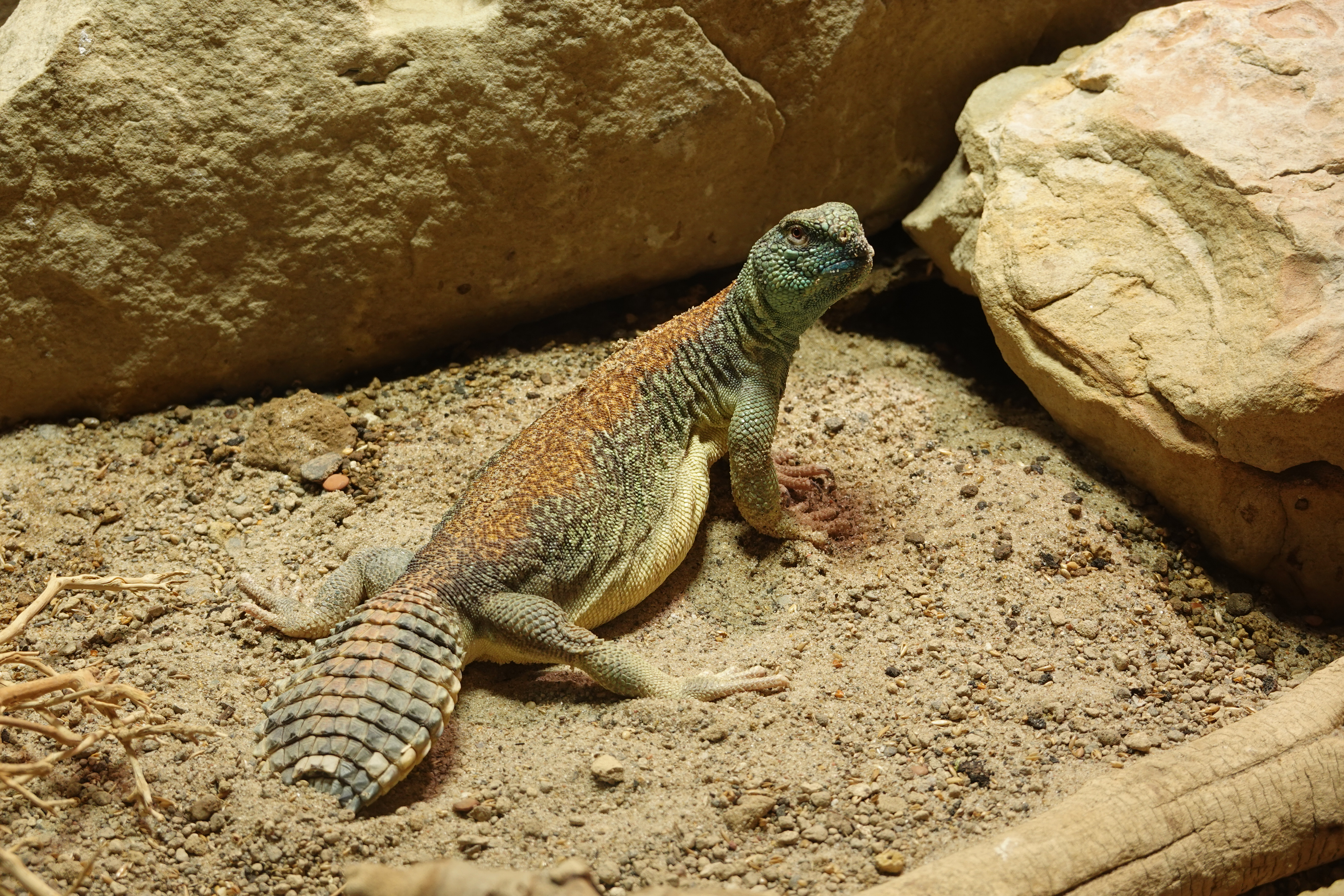

Conservation status
- Vulnerable (IUCN 3.1)
- CITES Appendix II (CITES)

Scientific classification
- Kingdom: Animalia
- Phylum: Chordata
- Class: Reptilia
- Order: Squamata
- Suborder: Iguania
- Family: Agamidae
- Genus: Uromastyx
- Species: U. thomasi

Binomial name
- Uromastyx thomasi Parker, 1930

= Uromastyx thomasi =

Species of lizard

Uromastyx thomasi, the Omani spiny-tailed lizard or Thomas's mastigure, is a species of agamid lizard. It is found in Oman.
