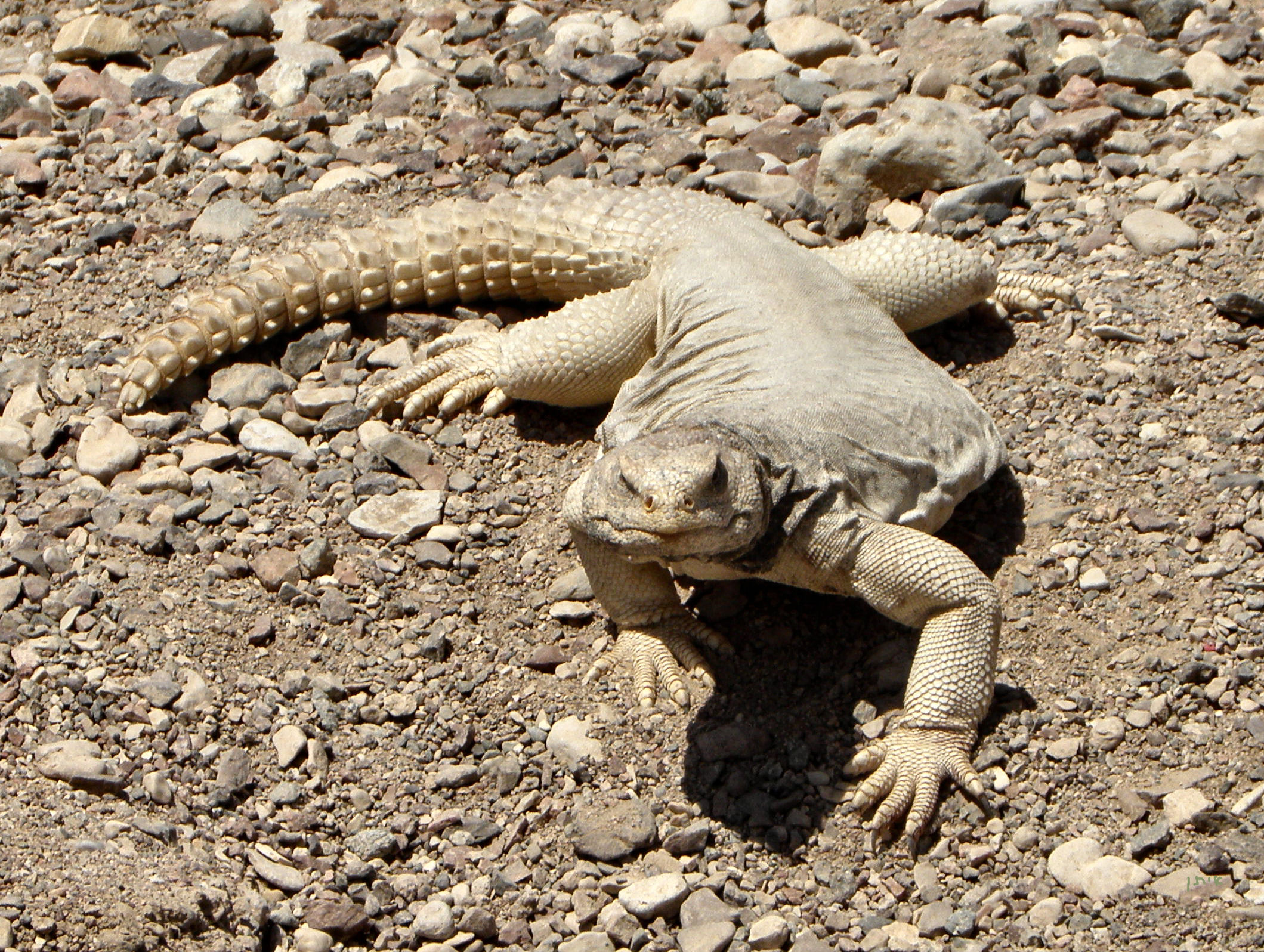

Conservation status
- Vulnerable (IUCN 3.1)
- CITES Appendix II

Scientific classification
- Kingdom: Animalia
- Phylum: Chordata
- Class: Reptilia
- Order: Squamata
- Suborder: Iguania
- Family: Agamidae
- Genus: Uromastyx
- Species: U. aegyptia

Binomial name
- Uromastyx aegyptia (Forskål, 1775)

Synonyms
- Lacerta aegyptia Forskål, 1775; Stellio spinipes Daudin, 1802; Uromastix [sic] spinipes — É. Geofroy Saint-Hilaire, 1827; Uromastix aegyptia — Anderson, 1896; Uromastyx aegyptius — Schmidt, 1939; Uromastyx aegyptia — Wilms, 2002

= Uromastyx aegyptia =

Species of lizard

Uromastyx aegyptia is a species of lizard in the family Agamidae. The species is native to North Africa and the Middle East.

== Common names ==
Common names for U. aegyptia include Egyptian mastigure, Egyptian spiny-tailed lizard, and, when referring to the subspecies Uromastyx aegyptia leptieni (see below), Leptien's mastigure.

== Description ==
U. aegyptia is one of the largest members of its genus, with an average total length (including tail) of 76 cm (30 in) for males.

== Geographic range and conservation status ==
U. aegyptia can be found in Egypt east of the Nile, Israel, Syria, Jordan, the Arabian Peninsula, Iraq, and Iran. It has a patchy distribution and is rare in most parts of its range. It is believed to be in decline because of habitat loss and over-harvesting.

== Subspecies ==
Three subspecies are recognized as being valid, including the nominotypical subspecies.

- Uromastyx aegyptia aegyptia (Forskål, 1775)
- Uromastyx aegyptia leptieni Wilms & Böhme, 2000
- Uromastyx aegyptia microlepis Blanford, 1874

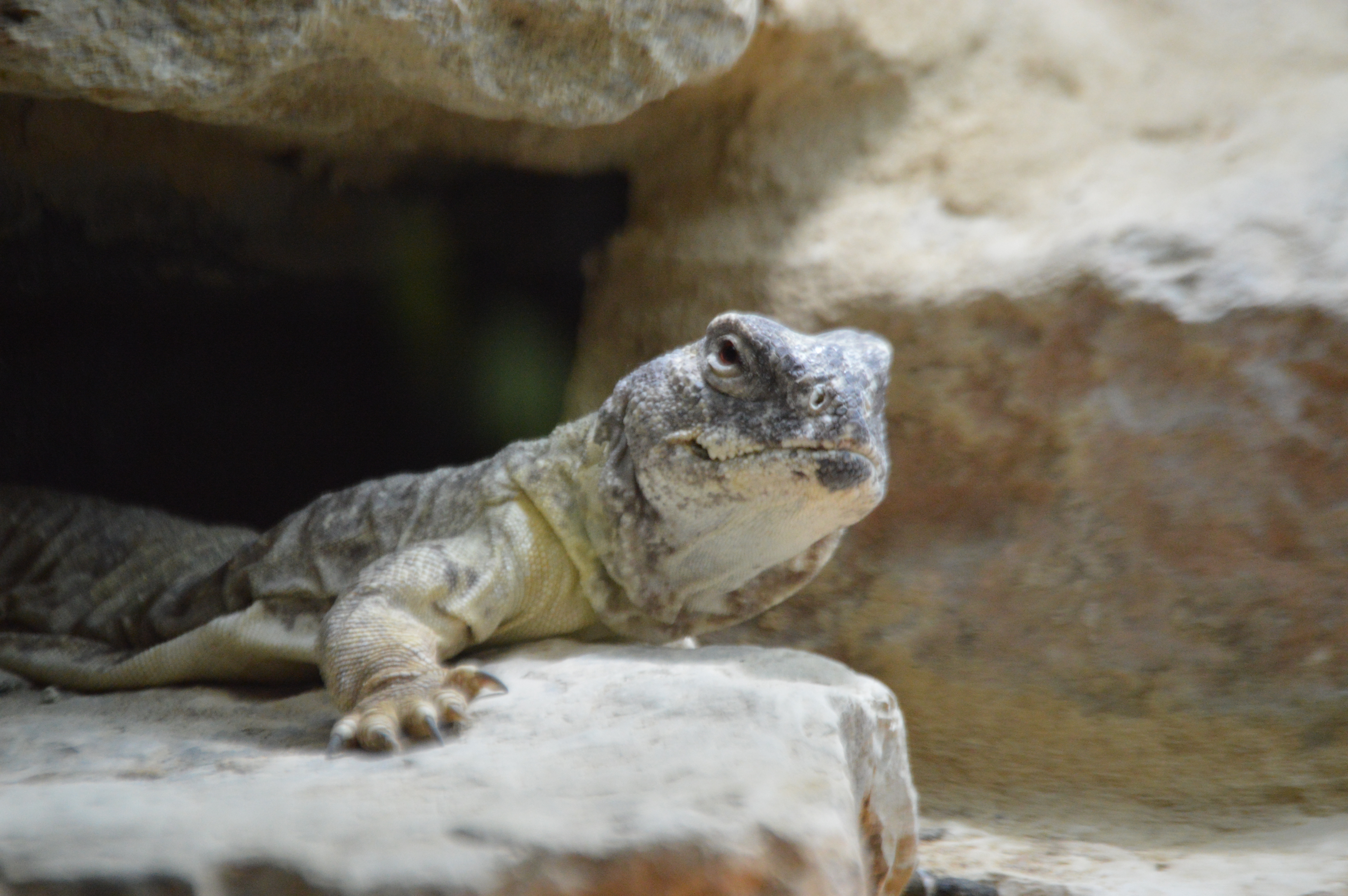
Uromastyx aegyptia leptieni

== Etymology ==
The subspecific name, leptieni, is in honor of German herpetologist Rolf Leptien.

== Economic use ==
U. aegyptia is locally known as dhab or ḍabb (Arabic: ضب). Its strong skin made good leather for the bedouins, while its meat was often considered as an alternative source of protein.

== Habitat ==
U. aegyptia lives in open, flat, gravelly, stony, and rocky areas at elevations up to 1,500 m (4,900 ft) above sea level.
