= Uromastyx alfredschmidti =

Conservation status
- Near Threatened (IUCN 3.1)
- CITES Appendix II

Scientific classification
- Kingdom: Animalia
- Phylum: Chordata
- Class: Reptilia
- Order: Squamata
- Suborder: Iguania
- Family: Agamidae
- Genus: Uromastyx
- Species: U. alfredschmidti

Binomial name
- Uromastyx alfredschmidti Wilms & Böhme, 2001
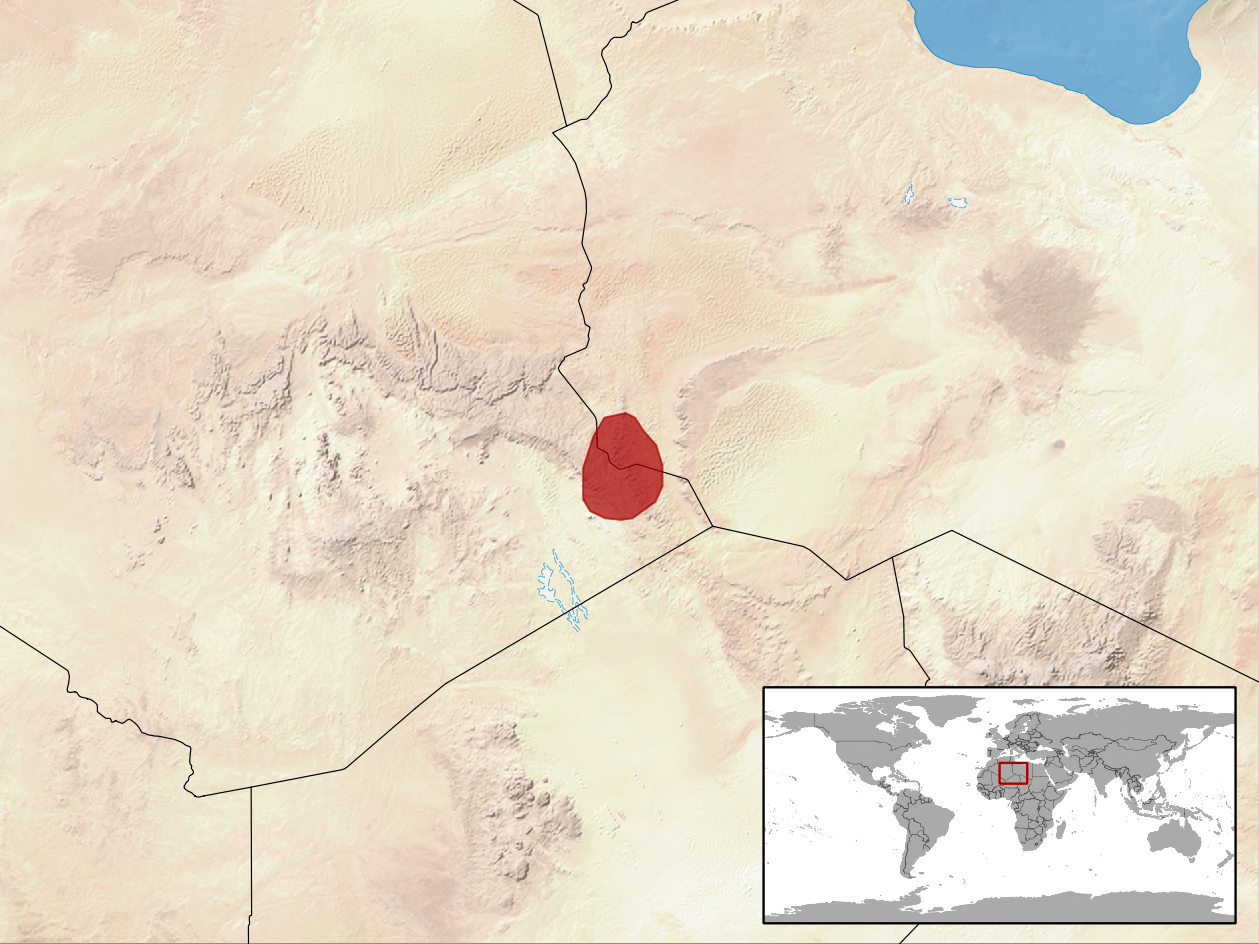

Species of lizard

Uromastyx alfredschmidti, commonly known as the ebony mastigure, Schmidt's mastigure, or Schmidt's spiny-tailed lizard, is a species of lizard in the family Agamidae. The species is indigenous to North Africa.

== Etymology ==
The specific name, alfredschmidti, is in honor of German herpetologist Alfred A. Schmidt.

== Geographic range ==
U. alfredschmidti is found in Algeria and Libya.

== Habitat ==
The natural habitats of U. alfredschmidti are subtropical or tropical dry shrubland, rocky areas, and hot deserts.

== Conservation status ==
U. alfredschmidti is threatened by habitat loss.

== Diet ==
Like other species in the genus Uromastyx, U. alfredschmidti is herbivorous.

== Reproduction ==
U. alfredschmidti is oviparous.

== Taxonomy ==
The generic name (Uromastyx) is derived from the Ancient Greek words ourá (οὐρά) meaning "tail" and mastigo (Μαστίχα) meaning "whip" or "scourge", after the thick-spiked tail characteristic of all Uromastyx species.
