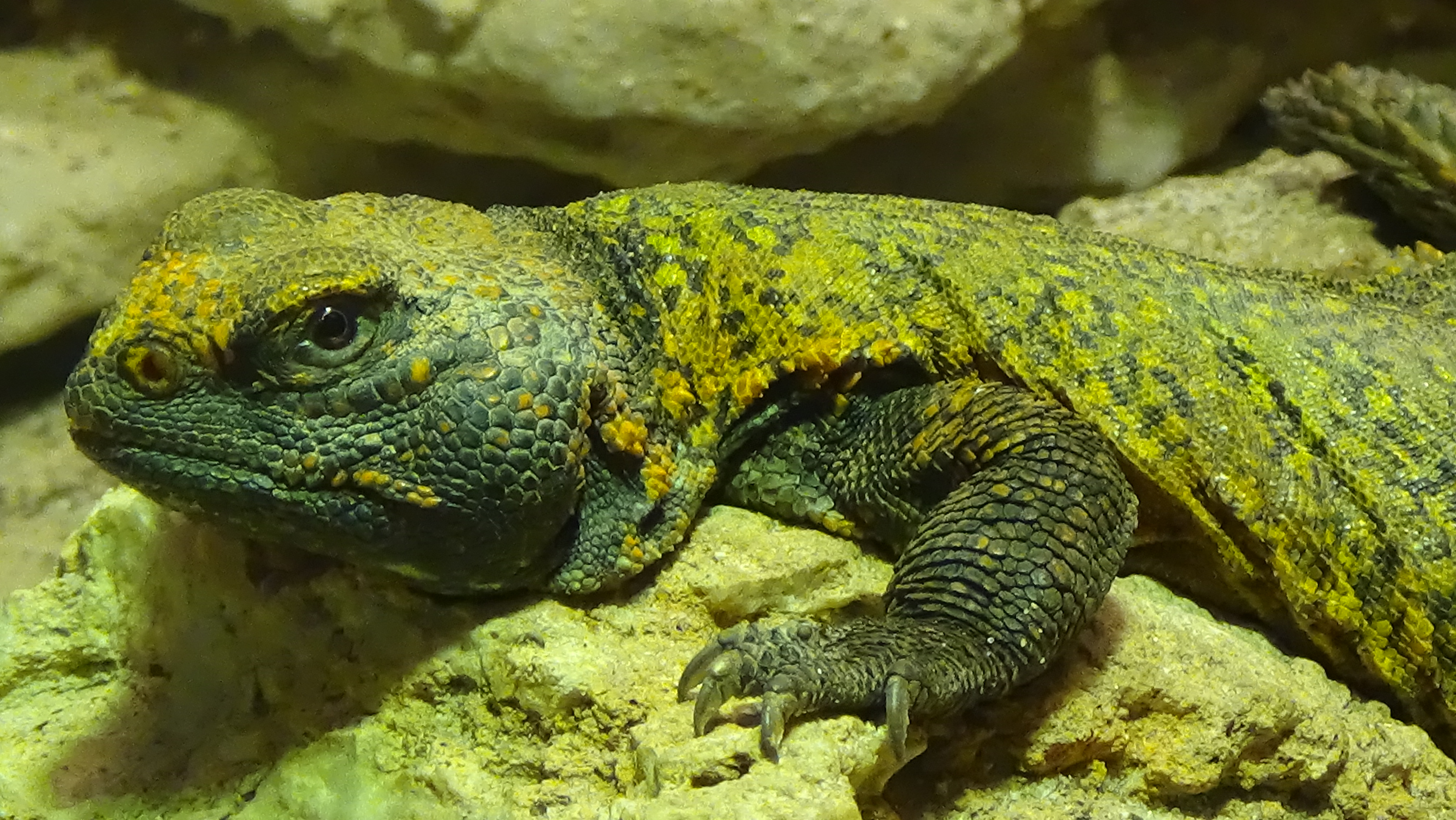

Conservation status
- CITES Appendix II (CITES)

Scientific classification
- Domain: Eukaryota
- Kingdom: Animalia
- Phylum: Chordata
- Class: Reptilia
- Order: Squamata
- Suborder: Iguania
- Family: Agamidae
- Genus: Uromastyx
- Species: U. nigriventris

Binomial name
- Uromastyx nigriventris Rothschild & Hartert, 1912

= Uromastyx nigriventris =

Species of lizard

Uromastyx nigriventris, the Moroccan spiny-tailed lizard, is a species of agamid lizard. It is found in Morocco and Algeria.
