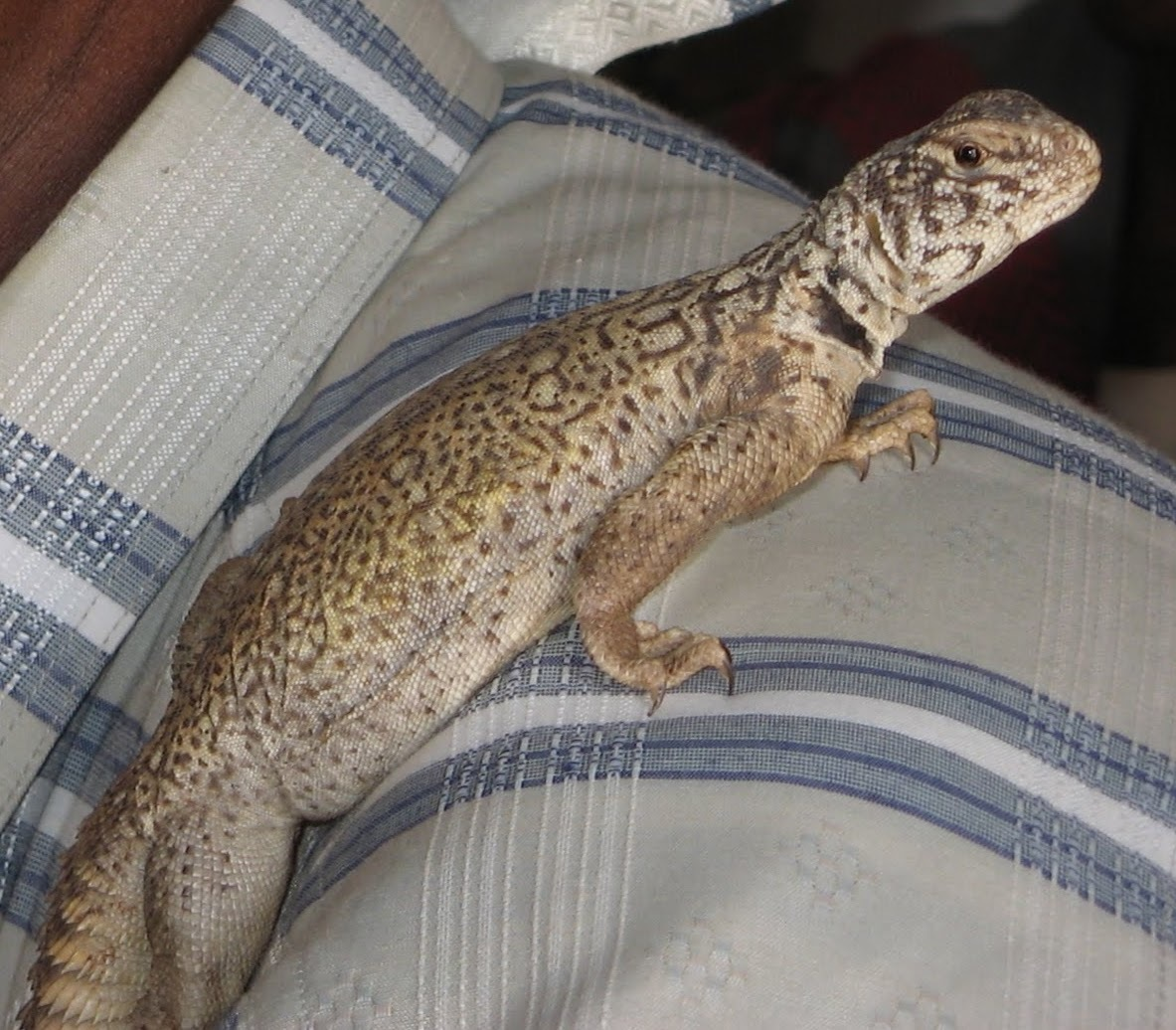

Conservation status
- Least Concern (IUCN 3.1)
- CITES Appendix II

Scientific classification
- Kingdom: Animalia
- Phylum: Chordata
- Class: Reptilia
- Order: Squamata
- Suborder: Iguania
- Family: Agamidae
- Genus: Uromastyx
- Species: U. benti

Binomial name
- Uromastyx benti (Anderson, 1894)
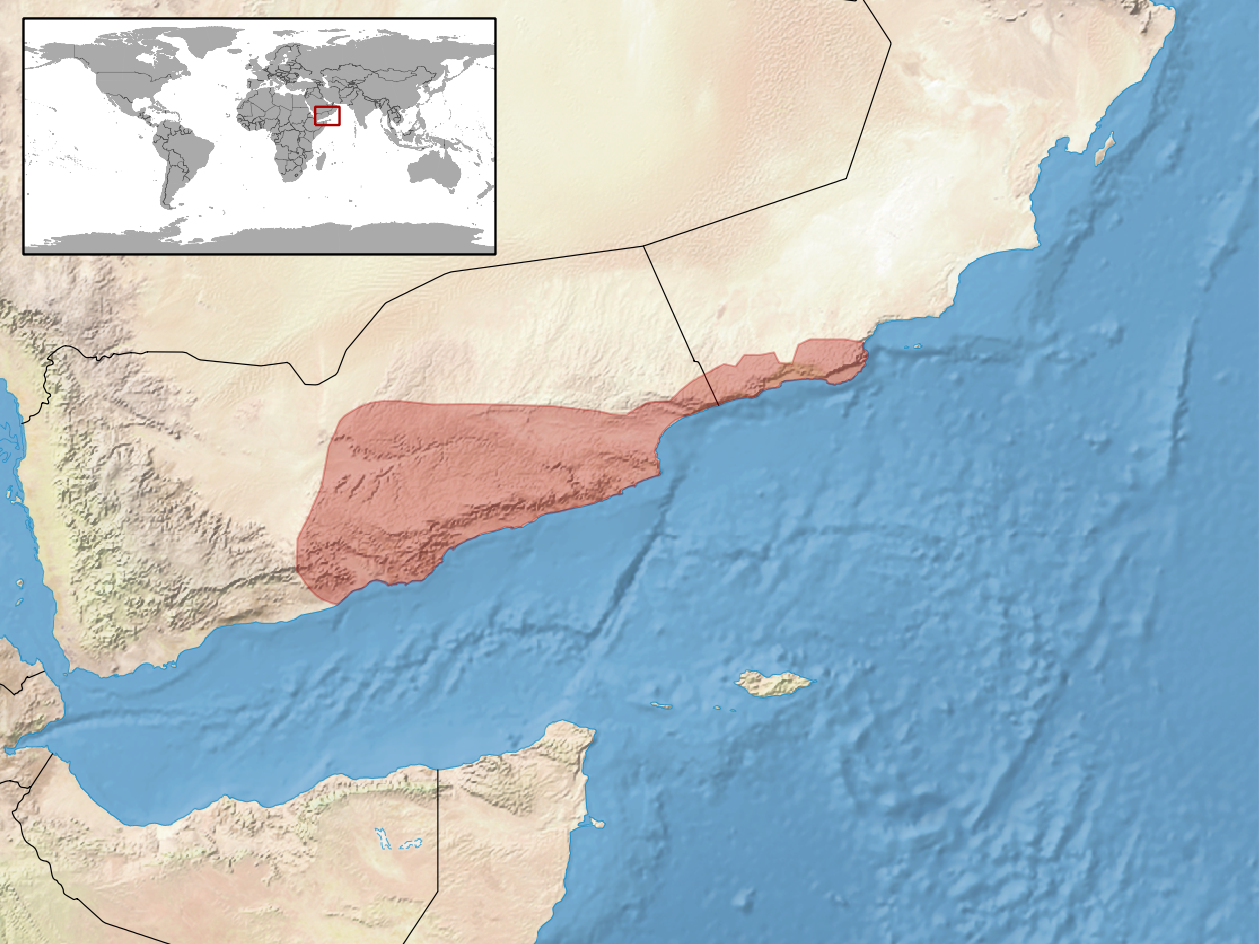

Synonyms
- Aporoscelis benti Anderson, 1894; Uromastix benti — Anderson, 1896; Uromastyx benti — Parker, 1938

= Uromastyx benti =

Species of lizard

Uromastyx benti, also known commonly as Bent's mastigure and the Yemeni spiny-tailed lizard, is a species of lizard in the family Agamidae. The species is native to the southeastern Arabian Peninsula.

== Etymology ==
The specific name, benti, is in honor of English explorer James Theodore Bent.

== Geographic range ==
U. benti is found in Oman and Yemen.

== Habitat ==
The preferred natural habitat of U. benti is rocky areas, at altitudes of 800–1,000 m (2,620–3,280 ft).

== Diet ==
U. benti is herbivorous, and its diet includes dry grasses.

== Reproduction ==
U. benti is oviparous. Breeding takes place once a year, and clutch size is 6–12 eggs.
