= William Archibald Macfadyen =

William Archibald Macfadyen FRGS (1893–1985) was a British geologist, petrologist, author, polyglot and a pioneer in geoconservation. He was a veteran of both World Wars and was a Fellow of the Royal Geographical Society.

== Education ==
Macfadyen was born on 5 November 1893 and attended Rydal Mount School, in North Wales. He then went on to study chemistry and geology at St. Johns college, Cambridge University.

== Army service ==
Macfadyen enlisted in the British army during the First World War and was commissioned as a second lieutenant in "The Buffs" (The Royal East Kent Regiment). On 7 August 1914 he was deployed to Bombay and then to Iraq. In 1916 he was promoted to lieutenant and subsequently acting captain. Due to suffering knee and wrist injuries by machine gun fire in 1917 in Iraq, he was declared unfit for further service. He was awarded the Military Cross. After leaving service he resumed his studies at Cambridge and went on to contribute to the war effort in Sheffield relining artillery barrels. In 1943, during the Second World War, he served in England, the Mediterranean and North Africa, as a hydrogeologist, being part of the well-drilling units and trained more junior military geologists. For his efforts he was promoted from second lieutenant to war substantive lieutenant and was subsequently promoted to major.

== Work in the field ==
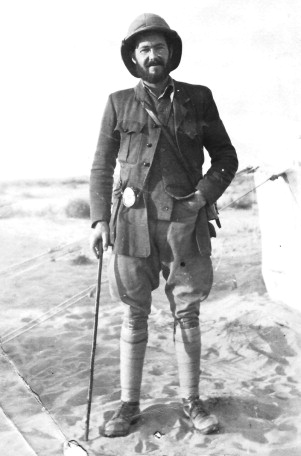
Macfadyen in Egypt

After returning from the war, he resumed his studies at Cambridge and in 1920 went on to join the Anglo Egyptian Oilfields Ltd working as their primary geologist. From 1922 to 1925 He was headquartered at Hurghada and extensively mapped the Eastern Desert, the western Sinai, and the Suez Canal areas. For a period of 2 months he acted as concessions manager, also undertook geological reconnaissance and published many maps. In 1926 he spent half a year studying and meticulously mapping the Farsan Islands, in the Southern Red Sea, and reported on the oil potential for Sea Petroleum Co. Ltd. He also visited the Zebaiyir Islands, and spent another six months in Rumania working with Astra Romania S.A., where he geologically mapped a portion of the Doicesti area.

While working in Somaliland in 1928–30, he gained his PhD, mapping the country geologically while working with Petroleum Company Ltd. During his time there he also studied the Dhulbahante garesas (dervish forts) and tombs in Taleh.

He worked as a government geologist in Iraq between 1931 and 1937. In his records he explains that he "ran this service for four years; engaged on all sorts of geological investigations, including economic minerals, oil, and water supply, and engineering problems of dam sites, bridge sites, road and building materials, canal sites etc, but mainly on water supply".

After returning from the Second World War in 1945, he once again worked as a civilian water geologist in Somaliland; after a brief time there he returned to the UK and was appointed a geologist position at the Nature Conservancy, the world's first statutory, non-voluntary conservation body. He went on to become the chief geologist for the conservancy. Other than his work on the geology of Somaliland, he is most known for his 25 publications on the palaeontology of Foraminifera.

== Legacy ==
Macfadyen is commemorated in the scientific name of a species of lizard, Uromastyx macfadyeni, which is endemic to Somalia.

== Works ==
- Geology and palaeontology of British Somaliland: The geology of British Somaliland, Volume 1
- Geological Highlights of the West Country (Handbooks / Nature Conservancy)
- Water Supplies in ʻIraq

== See also ==
- Foraminifera
