= Carl von Heyden =

German senator and entomologist

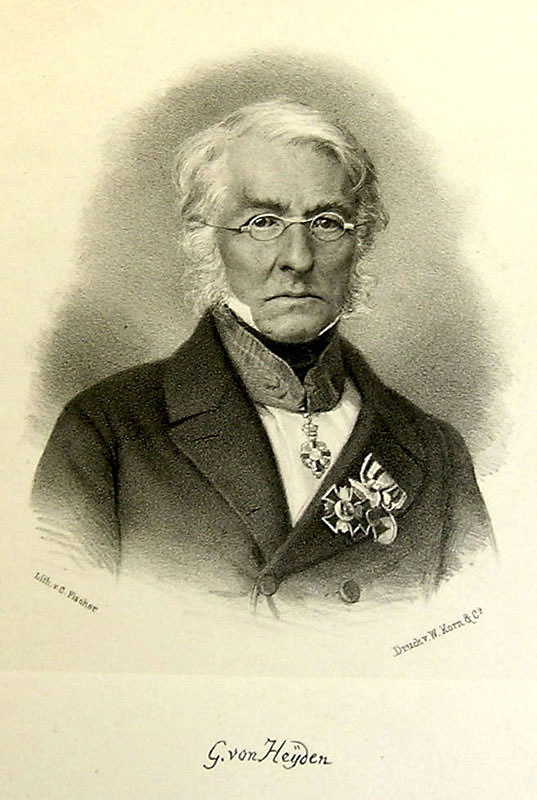
Carl von Heyden

Carl Heinrich Georg(es) von Heyden (20 January 1793 Frankfurt – 7 July 1866) was a German senator and entomologist. He collected insects in all orders but was especially interested in Coleoptera, Microlepidoptera, Hymenoptera, Diptera and fossil insects. His collections are divided between the German Entomological Institute and the Senckenberg Museum.

He studied forestry under Johann Matthäus Bechstein at the Dreißigacker Forest Academy near Meiningen, then continued his education at the University of Heidelberg. With his son, Lukas von Heyden, he conducted studies of fossil insects found in lignite. In addition to his entomological research, he performed investigations of reptile specimens collected by Eduard Rüppell in North Africa.

In 1817, he was co-founder of the Senckenbergischen Naturforschenden Gesellschaft.

== Selected works ==
- Fossile Insekten aus der Braunkohle von Sieblos [Fossil insects from lignite of Sieblos], 1858.
- Fossile Insekten aus der Rheinischen Braunkohle [Fossil insects from Rhineland lignite], 1859.
- Fossile Insekten aus der Braunkohle von Salzhausen [Fossil insects from lignite of Salzhausen], 1865.
