= List of Pselaphinae genera =

This is a list of 114 genera in the subfamily Pselaphinae, ant-loving beetles.

== Pselaphinae genera ==
- Abdiunguis Park and Wagner, 1962^{i c g}
- Acolonia Casey, 1894^{i c}
- Actiastes Casey, 1897^{i c g b}
- Actium Casey, 1886^{i c g b}
- Actizona Chandler, 1985^{i c g}
- Adranes LeConte, 1849^{i c g b}
- Allobrox Fletcher, 1928^{i c g}
- Allotrimium Park, 1943^{i c g}
- Anchylarthron Brendel, 1887^{i c g}
- Anitra Casey, 1894^{i c g}
- Apharus Reitter, 1882^{i c g}
- Arianops Brendel, 1893^{i c g b}
- Arthmius LeConte, 1849^{i c g b}
- Arthromelodes Jeannel, 1954^{c g}
- Atinus Horn, 1868^{i c g b}
- Balega Reitter, 1882^{i c g}
- Batriasymmodes Park, 1951^{i c g b}
- Batrisodes Reitter, 1882^{i c g b}
- Berdura Reitter, 1882^{i c g}
- Bibloplectus Reitter, 1881^{i c g b}
- Bibloporus Thomson, 1859^{i c g}
- Biotus Casey, 1887^{i c g b}
- Bontomtes Grigarick and Schuster, 1980^{i c g}
- Brachygluta Thomson, 1859^{i c g b}
- Briaraxis Brendel, 1894^{i c g}
- Bythinoplectus Reitter, 1882^{i c g}
- Caccoplectus Sharp, 1887^{i c g b}
- Cedius LeConte, 1849^{i c g b}
- Ceophyllus LeConte, 1849^{i c g b}
- Circocerus Motschulsky, 1855^{i c g}
- Conoplectus Brendel, 1888^{i c g b}
- Ctenisis Raffray, 1890^{i c g b}
- Ctenisodes Raffray, 1897^{i c g b}
- Cupila Casey, 1897^{i c g}
- Custotychus Park & Wagner, 1962^{i c g b}
- Cylindrarctus Schaufuss, 1887^{i c g b}
- Dalmonexus Park, 1942^{i c g}
- Dalmosanus Park, 1952^{i c g b}
- Dalmosella Casey, 1897^{i c g b}
- Decarthron Brendel, 1865^{i c g b}
- Ephimia Reitter, 1883^{i c g}
- Euboarhexius Grigarick & Schuster, 1966^{i c g b}
- Euphalepsus Reitter, 1883^{i c g}
- Euplecterga Park and Wagner, 1962^{i c g}
- Euplectus Leach, 1817^{i c g b}
- Eupsenius LeConte, 1849^{i c g b}
- Eurhexius Sharp, 1887^{i c g}
- Eutrichites LeConte, 1880^{i c g b}
- Eutyphlus LeConte, 1880^{i c g b}
- Foveoscapha Park and Wagner, 1962^{i c g}
- Fustiger LeConte, 1866^{i c g b}
- Haasellia Wagner, 1984^{i c g}
- Hamotus Aubé, 1844^{i c g b}
- Hatchia Park and Wagner, 1962^{i c g}
- Hesperotychus Schuster and Marsh, 1958^{i c g}
- Kenocoelus Broun, 1911^{g}
- Lemelba Park, 1953^{i c g}
- Leptoplectus Casey, 1908^{i c g b}
- Lucifotychus Park & Wagner, 1962^{i c g b}
- Machaerodes Brendel, 1890^{i c g b}
- Malleoceps Park, 1954^{i c g}
- Mayetia Mulsant & Rey, 1875^{i c g b}
- Megarafonus Casey, 1897^{i c g b}
- Melba Casey, 1897^{i c g b}
- Mipseltyrus Park, 1953^{i c g b}
- Morius Casey, 1894^{i c g b}
- Nearctitychus Chandler, 1988^{i c g b}
- Neopselaphus Jeannel, 1951^{i c g}
- Neotyrus Raffray, 1895^{i c g}
- Nisaxis Casey, 1886^{i c g b}
- Oropodes Casey, 1894^{i c g b}
- Oropus Casey, 1886^{i c g b}
- Ouachitychus Chandler, 1988^{i c g}
- Pilactium Grigarick and Schuster, 1970^{i c g}
- Prespelea Park, 1953^{i c g}
- Pselaphus Herbst, 1792^{i c g b}
- Pselaptrichus Brendel, 1889^{i c g b}
- Pselaptus LeConte, 1880^{i c g}
- Pseudactium Casey, 1908^{i c g b}
- Pycnoplectus Casey, 1897^{i c g b}
- Ramecia Casey, 1894^{i c g b}
- Ramelbida Park, 1942^{i c g}
- Reichenbachia Leach, 1826^{i c g b}
- Rhexidius Casey, 1887^{i c g b}
- Rhexius LeConte, 1849^{i c g b}
- Rhinoscepsis LeConte, 1878^{i c g}
- Rybaxis Saulcy, 1876^{i c g b}
- Saxet Grigarick and Schuster, 1980^{i c g}
- Scalenarthrus LeConte, 1880^{i c g}
- Sebaga Raffray, 1891^{i c g b}
- Simplona Casey, 1897^{i c g}
- Sonoma Casey, 1886^{i c g b}
- Speleobama Park, 1951^{i c g}
- Speleochus Park, 1951^{i c g}
- Subterrochus Park, 1960^{i c g}
- Tetrascapha Schuster and Marsh, 1957^{i c g}
- Texamaurops Barr & Steeves, 1963^{i c g b}
- Thesiastes Casey, 1894^{i c g b}
- Thesium Casey, 1884^{i c g b}
- Tmesiphorus LeConte, 1849^{i c g b}
- Tomoplectus Raffray, 1898^{i c g}
- Trichonyx Chaudoir, 1845^{i c g b}
- Trigonoplectus Bowman, 1934^{i c g}
- Trimioarcus Park, 1952^{i c g}
- Trimiomelba Casey, 1897^{i c g b}
- Trimioplectus Brendel, 1891^{i c g b}
- Trimiosella Raffray, 1898^{i c g}
- Trimium Aubé, 1833^{i c g b}
- Trisignis Park and Schuster, 1955^{i c g}
- Tychobythinus Ganglbauer, 1896^{i c g b}
- Tychus Leach, 1817^{c g b}
- Tyrus Aubé, 1833^{i c g b}
- Upoluna Schaufuss, 1886^{b}
- Valda Casey, 1894^{i c g b}
- Zolium Casey, 1897^{i c g}
- Zonaira Grigarick and Schuster, 1980^{i c g}

Data sources: i = ITIS, c = Catalogue of Life, g = GBIF, b = Bugguide.net
