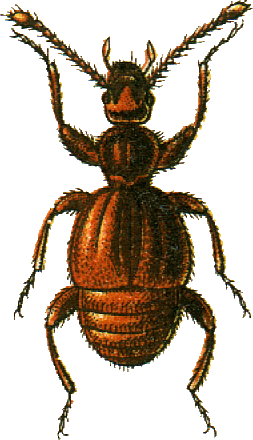
- Trichonyx sulcicollis

Scientific classification
- Kingdom: Animalia
- Phylum: Arthropoda
- Clade: Pancrustacea
- Class: Insecta
- Order: Coleoptera
- Suborder: Polyphaga
- Infraorder: Staphyliniformia
- Family: Staphylinidae
- Subfamily: Pselaphinae
- Supertribe: Euplectitae; Streubel, 1839

= Euplectitae =

Supertribe of beetles

Euplectitae is a supertribe of ant-loving beetles in the family Staphylinidae. There are at least 20 genera and 30 described species in Euplectitae.

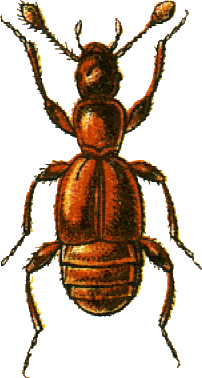
Trimium brevicorne

== Genera ==
These 27 genera belong to the supertribe Euplectitae:

- Actiastes Casey, 1897^{i c g b}
- Actium Casey, 1886^{i c g b}
- Bibloplectus Reitter, 1881^{i c g b}
- Conoplectus Brendel, 1888^{i c g b}
- Dalmosanus Park, 1952^{i c g b}
- Dalmosella Casey, 1897^{i c g b}
- Euboarhexius Grigarick & Schuster, 1966^{i c g b}
- Euplectus Leach, 1817^{i c g b}
- Eutyphlus LeConte, 1880^{i c g b}
- Leptoplectus Casey, 1908^{i c g b}
- Mayetia Mulsant & Rey, 1875^{i c g b}
- Melba Casey, 1897^{i c g b}
- Morius Casey, 1894^{i c g b}
- Oropodes Casey, 1894^{i c g b}
- Oropus Casey, 1886^{i c g b}
- Plectophloeus Reitter, 1891^{i c g b}
- Pseudactium Casey, 1908^{i c g b}
- Pycnoplectus Casey, 1897^{i c g b}
- Ramecia Casey, 1894^{i c g b}
- Rhexidius Casey, 1887^{i c g b}
- Rhexius LeConte, 1849^{i c g b}
- Sebaga Raffray, 1891^{i c g b}
- Thesiastes Casey, 1894^{i c g b}
- Thesium Casey, 1884^{i c g b}
- Trichonyx Chaudoir, 1845^{i c g b}
- Trimiomelba Casey, 1897^{i c g b}
- Trimioplectus Brendel, 1891^{i c g b}
- Trimium Aubé, 1833^{i c g b}

Data sources: i = ITIS, c = Catalogue of Life, g = GBIF, b = Bugguide.net
