= Chandleria =

Scientific classification
- Kingdom: Animalia
- Phylum: Arthropoda
- Class: Insecta
- Order: Coleoptera
- Suborder: Polyphaga
- Infraorder: Staphyliniformia
- Family: Staphylinidae
- Subfamily: Pselaphinae
- Supertribe: Euplectitae
- Tribe: Metopiasini
- Genus: Chandleria; Comellini, 1998

Species
- Several, including: Chandleria elegans

Genus of beetles

Chandleria is a genus of rove beetles in the subfamily Pselaphinae.
