= Corethromyces elegans =

Scientific classification
- Kingdom: Fungi
- Division: Ascomycota
- Class: Laboulbeniomycetes
- Order: Laboulbeniales
- Family: Laboulbeniaceae
- Genus: Corethromyces
- Species: C. elegans

Binomial name
- Corethromyces elegans Maire (1931)

Synonyms
- Peyerimhoffiella elegans Maire, 1916

Species of fungus

Corethromyces elegans is a species of fungus in the family Laboulbeniaceae. A specimen at the University of Illinois Herbarium was found on Rhexius insculptus Lec. (ant-loving beetles or Pselaphinae) in La Salle County, Illinois, United States.
