= Chandleria elegans =

Scientific classification
- Kingdom: Animalia
- Phylum: Arthropoda
- Class: Insecta
- Order: Coleoptera
- Suborder: Polyphaga
- Infraorder: Staphyliniformia
- Family: Staphylinidae
- Genus: Chandleria
- Species: C. elegans

Binomial name
- Chandleria elegans (Sharp, 1887)

Synonyms
- Metopias elegans Sharp, 1887

Species of beetle

Chandleria elegans is a species of rove beetles in the subfamily Pselaphinae. The type specimen was from Volcán, Chiriquí Province, Panama.
