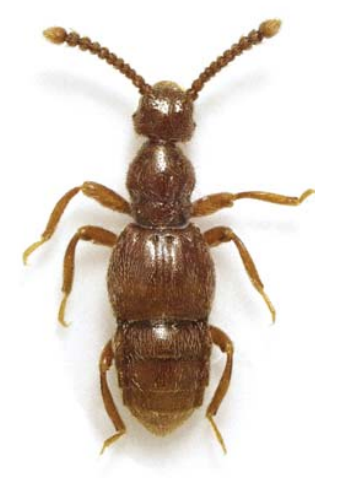
- Female Kenocoelus johni

Scientific classification
- Kingdom: Animalia
- Phylum: Arthropoda
- Class: Insecta
- Order: Coleoptera
- Suborder: Polyphaga
- Infraorder: Staphyliniformia
- Family: Staphylinidae
- Subfamily: Pselaphinae
- Genus: Kenocoelus; Broun, 1911

= Kenocoelus =

Genus of beetles

Kenocoelus is a genus of rove beetles (the family Staphylinidae) containing a number of species, all endemic to New Zealand. It is part of the Trichonychini tribe, in the Pselaphinae subfamily of Staphylinidae.

== Description ==
These are small beetles (body size 1.46–1.76mm) with short antennae and small, ovoid eyes. They can be distinguished from similar genera of Trichonychini from their small size, short first antennal segment and pronotum without sulci.

== Ant associations ==
Some species of Kenocoelus have been repeatedly collected within Huberia ant nests suggesting that the beetles are inquilines although interactions between the species have not been directly observed.

== Species ==
- Kenocoelus dimorphus Broun, 1911
- Kenocoelus johni Nomura & Leschen, 2015
- Kenocoelus mikonuiensis Nomura & Leschen, 2015
