= Leptoplectus pertenuis =

Scientific classification
- Kingdom: Animalia
- Phylum: Arthropoda
- Class: Insecta
- Order: Coleoptera
- Suborder: Polyphaga
- Infraorder: Staphyliniformia
- Family: Staphylinidae
- Genus: Leptoplectus
- Species: L. pertenuis

Binomial name
- Leptoplectus pertenuis (Casey, 1884)

Synonyms
- Leptoplectus exilissimus Casey, 1908

Species of beetle

Leptoplectus pertenuis is a species of ant-loving beetle in the family Staphylinidae. It is found in North America.
