= Mipseltyrus =

Scientific classification
- Kingdom: Animalia
- Phylum: Arthropoda
- Class: Insecta
- Order: Coleoptera
- Suborder: Polyphaga
- Infraorder: Staphyliniformia
- Family: Staphylinidae
- Subfamily: Pselaphinae
- Genus: Mipseltyrus

Genus of beetles

Mipseltyrus is a genus of ant-loving beetles in the family Staphylinidae. There are at least 4 described species in Mipseltyrus.

== Species ==
- M. levini Chandler, 1978
- M. mirus Schuster, 1956
- M. nicolayi Park, 1953
- M. parki Schuster, 1956
