= Ramecia crinita =

Scientific classification
- Kingdom: Animalia
- Phylum: Arthropoda
- Class: Insecta
- Order: Coleoptera
- Suborder: Polyphaga
- Infraorder: Staphyliniformia
- Family: Staphylinidae
- Genus: Ramecia
- Species: R. crinita

Binomial name
- Ramecia crinita (Brendel, 1865)

Species of beetle

Ramecia crinita is a species of ant-loving beetle in the family Staphylinidae. It is found in North America.
