= Rhexius schmitti =

Scientific classification
- Kingdom: Animalia
- Phylum: Arthropoda
- Class: Insecta
- Order: Coleoptera
- Suborder: Polyphaga
- Infraorder: Staphyliniformia
- Family: Staphylinidae
- Genus: Rhexius
- Species: R. schmitti

Binomial name
- Rhexius schmitti Brendel, 1893

Synonyms
- Rhexius hirsutus Casey, 1908

Species of beetle

Rhexius schmitti is a species of ant-loving beetles in the family Staphylinidae. It is found in North America. The beetles are commonly found under organic materials like rotting wood and litter from leaves.
