= Berdura =

Scientific classification
- Kingdom: Animalia
- Phylum: Arthropoda
- Class: Insecta
- Order: Coleoptera
- Suborder: Polyphaga
- Infraorder: Staphyliniformia
- Family: Staphylinidae
- Subfamily: Pselaphinae
- Genus: Berdura; Reitter, 1882

Genus of beetles

Berdura is a genus of ant-loving beetles in the family Staphylinidae. There is at least one described species in Berdura, B. excisula.
