= Nisaxis caudata =

Scientific classification
- Kingdom: Animalia
- Phylum: Arthropoda
- Class: Insecta
- Order: Coleoptera
- Suborder: Polyphaga
- Infraorder: Staphyliniformia
- Family: Staphylinidae
- Genus: Nisaxis
- Species: N. caudata

Binomial name
- Nisaxis caudata Schaeffer, 1905

Species of beetle

Nisaxis caudata is a species of ant-loving beetle in the family Staphylinidae. It is found in Central America and North America.
