= Euboarhexius perscitus =

Scientific classification
- Kingdom: Animalia
- Phylum: Arthropoda
- Class: Insecta
- Order: Coleoptera
- Suborder: Polyphaga
- Infraorder: Staphyliniformia
- Family: Staphylinidae
- Genus: Euboarhexius
- Species: E. perscitus

Binomial name
- Euboarhexius perscitus (Fletcher, 1932)

Species of beetle

Euboarhexius perscitus is a species of ant-loving beetle in the family Staphylinidae. It is found in North America.
