= Bibloplectus ruficeps =

Scientific classification
- Kingdom: Animalia
- Phylum: Arthropoda
- Class: Insecta
- Order: Coleoptera
- Suborder: Polyphaga
- Infraorder: Staphyliniformia
- Family: Staphylinidae
- Genus: Bibloplectus
- Species: B. ruficeps

Binomial name
- Bibloplectus ruficeps (Motschulsky, 1856)

Species of beetle

Bibloplectus ruficeps is a species in the family Staphylinidae ("rove beetles"), in the order Coleoptera ("beetles"). It is found in North America.
