= Euplectus duryi =

Scientific classification
- Kingdom: Animalia
- Phylum: Arthropoda
- Class: Insecta
- Order: Coleoptera
- Suborder: Polyphaga
- Infraorder: Staphyliniformia
- Family: Staphylinidae
- Genus: Euplectus
- Species: E. duryi

Binomial name
- Euplectus duryi Casey, 1908

Synonyms
- Euplectus barri Park and Wagner, 1962

Species of beetle

Euplectus duryi is a species of ant-loving beetle in the family Staphylinidae. It is found in North America.
