= Actiastes fundatum =

Scientific classification
- Kingdom: Animalia
- Phylum: Arthropoda
- Class: Insecta
- Order: Coleoptera
- Suborder: Polyphaga
- Infraorder: Staphyliniformia
- Family: Staphylinidae
- Genus: Actiastes
- Species: A. fundatum

Binomial name
- Actiastes fundatum Grigarick & Schuster, 1971

Species of beetle

Actiastes fundatum is a species of ant-loving beetle in the family Staphylinidae. It is found in North America.
