= Conoplectus susae =

Scientific classification
- Kingdom: Animalia
- Phylum: Arthropoda
- Class: Insecta
- Order: Coleoptera
- Suborder: Polyphaga
- Infraorder: Staphyliniformia
- Family: Staphylinidae
- Genus: Conoplectus
- Species: C. susae

Binomial name
- Conoplectus susae Carlton, 1983

Synonyms
- Conoplectus newtoni Carlton, 1983

Species of beetle

Conoplectus susae is a species of ant-loving beetle in the family Staphylinidae. It is found in North America.
