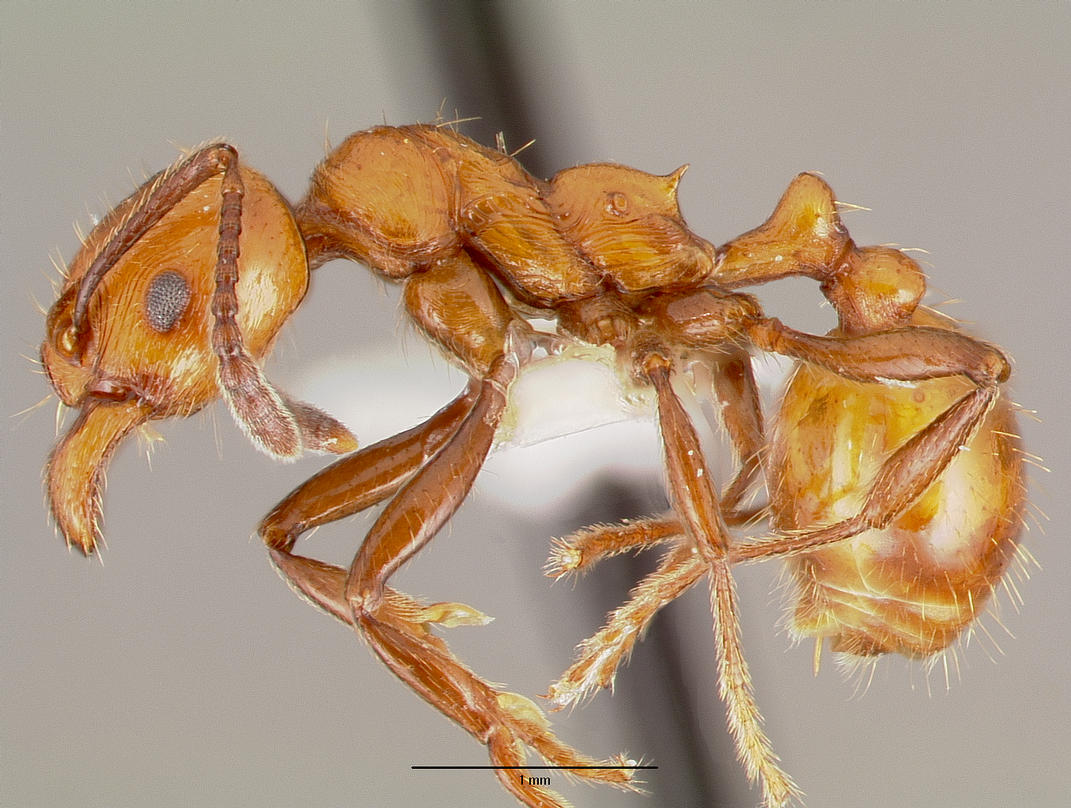
- Huberia striata worker

Scientific classification
- Kingdom: Animalia
- Phylum: Arthropoda
- Class: Insecta
- Order: Hymenoptera
- Family: Formicidae
- Subfamily: Myrmicinae
- Genus: Huberia
- Species: H. striata

Binomial name
- Huberia striata (Smith, F., 1876)

Synonyms
- Huberia striata rufescens Forel, 1892

= Huberia striata =

Species of ant

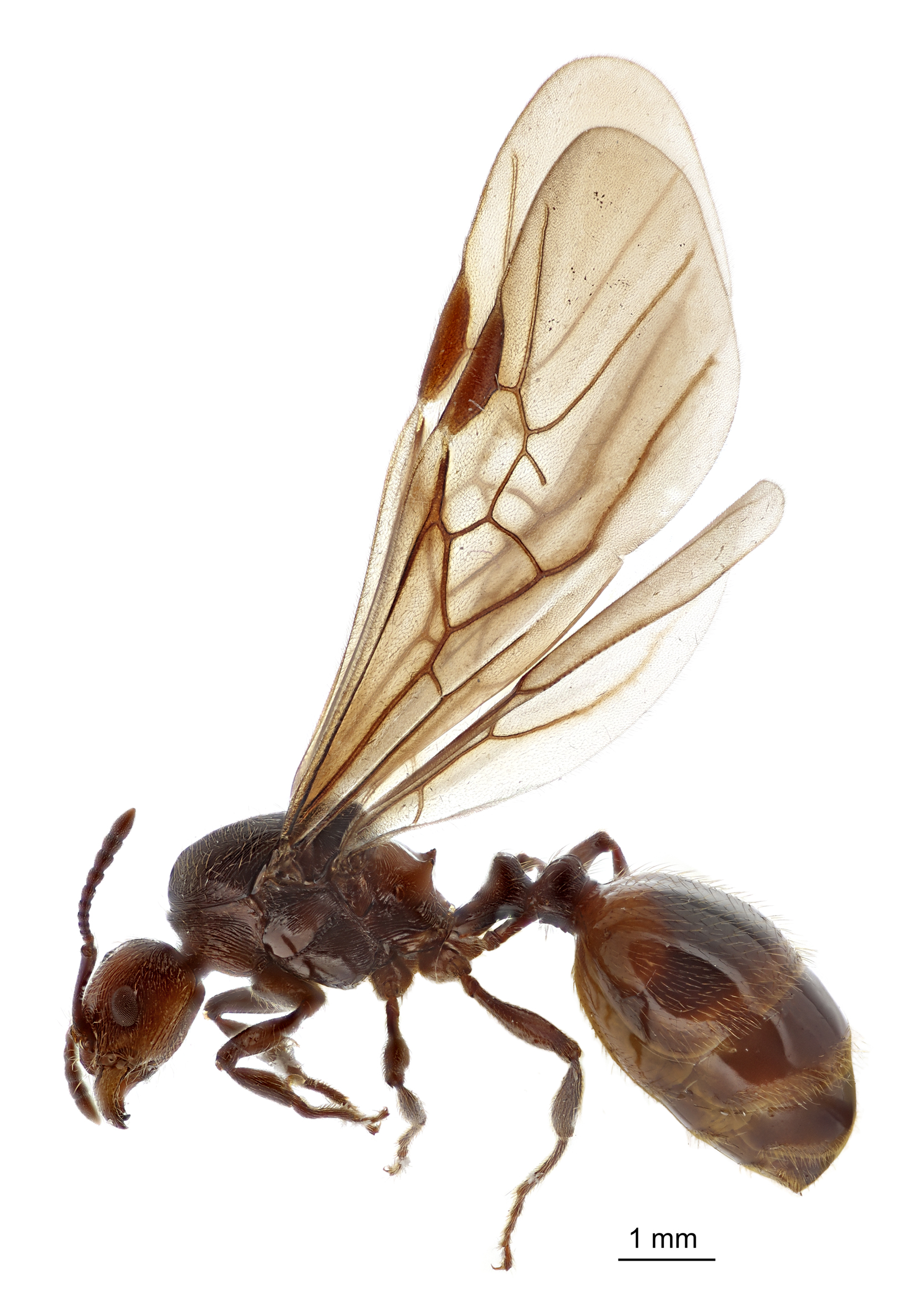
Winged caste of Huberia striata

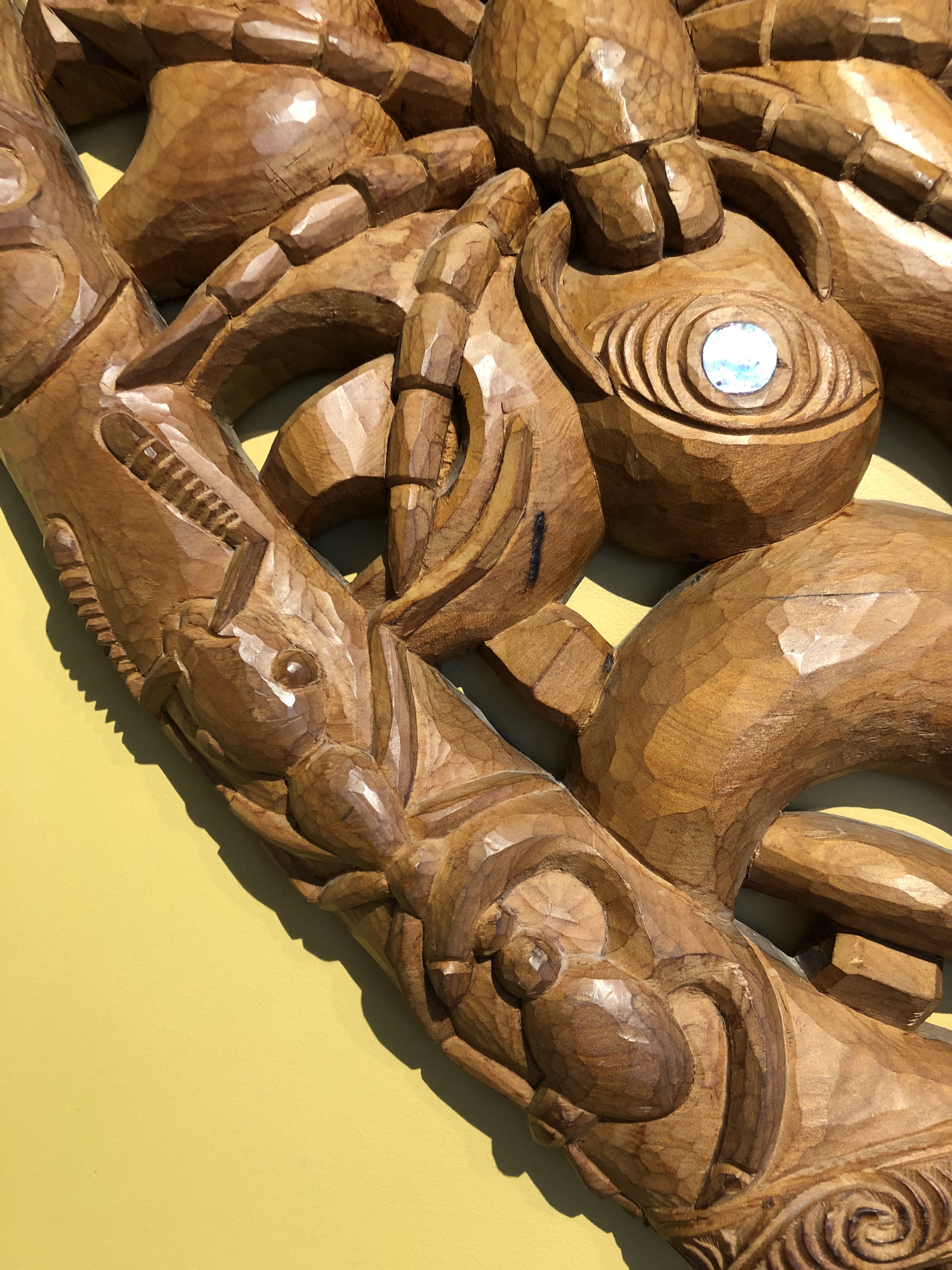
Striated ant carved on pare on display at the New Zealand Arthropod Collection at Landcare Research, Auckland.

Huberia striata is a species of ant in the genus Huberia, endemic to New Zealand.

The species is found widely across New Zealand, nesting in soil. They are non-aggressive, and ants from different locations can cohabitate without conflict.

== Description ==
This ant is generally a golden brown color. The workers are between 4 and 5mm long. Reproductive females are twice as large as workers.

== See also ==
- Huberia brounii, the only other species of the genus
