= Rhexius substriatus =

Scientific classification
- Kingdom: Animalia
- Phylum: Arthropoda
- Class: Insecta
- Order: Coleoptera
- Suborder: Polyphaga
- Infraorder: Staphyliniformia
- Family: Staphylinidae
- Genus: Rhexius
- Species: R. substriatus

Binomial name
- Rhexius substriatus LeConte, 1878

Synonyms
- Rhexius virginicus Casey, 1908

Species of beetle

Rhexius substriatus is a species of ant-loving beetle in the family Staphylinidae. It is found in North America.
