= Actiastes globiferum =

Scientific classification
- Kingdom: Animalia
- Phylum: Arthropoda
- Class: Insecta
- Order: Coleoptera
- Suborder: Polyphaga
- Infraorder: Staphyliniformia
- Family: Staphylinidae
- Genus: Actiastes
- Species: A. globiferum

Binomial name
- Actiastes globiferum (LeConte, 1849)

Synonyms
- Actiastes blandum (Casey, 1908)

Species of beetle

Actiastes globiferum is a species of ant-loving beetle in the family Staphylinidae. It is found in North America.
