= Hamotus elongatus =

Scientific classification
- Kingdom: Animalia
- Phylum: Arthropoda
- Class: Insecta
- Order: Coleoptera
- Suborder: Polyphaga
- Infraorder: Staphyliniformia
- Family: Staphylinidae
- Genus: Hamotus
- Species: H. elongatus

Binomial name
- Hamotus elongatus (Brendel, 1890)

Species of beetle

Hamotus elongatus is a species of ant-loving beetle in the family Staphylinidae.
