= Oropus striatus =

Scientific classification
- Kingdom: Animalia
- Phylum: Arthropoda
- Class: Insecta
- Order: Coleoptera
- Suborder: Polyphaga
- Infraorder: Staphyliniformia
- Family: Staphylinidae
- Genus: Oropus
- Species: O. striatus

Binomial name
- Oropus striatus (LeConte, 1874)

Synonyms
- Oropus brevipennis Casey, 1908; Oropus keeni Casey, 1908

Species of beetle

Oropus striatus is a species of ant-loving beetle in the family Staphylinidae. It is found in North America.
