= Megarafonus lentus =

Scientific classification
- Kingdom: Animalia
- Phylum: Arthropoda
- Class: Insecta
- Order: Coleoptera
- Suborder: Polyphaga
- Infraorder: Staphyliniformia
- Family: Staphylinidae
- Genus: Megarafonus
- Species: M. lentus

Binomial name
- Megarafonus lentus Schuster & Marsh, 1958

Species of beetle

Megarafonus lentus is a species of ant-loving beetle in the family Staphylinidae. It is found in North America.
