= Rhexius =

Scientific classification
- Kingdom: Animalia
- Phylum: Arthropoda
- Class: Insecta
- Order: Coleoptera
- Suborder: Polyphaga
- Infraorder: Staphyliniformia
- Family: Staphylinidae
- Subfamily: Pselaphinae
- Supertribe: Euplectitae
- Tribe: Trogastrini
- Genus: Rhexius; LeConte, 1849

Genus of beetles

Rhexius is a genus of ant-loving beetles in the family Staphylinidae. There are about 6 described species in Rhexius.

== Species ==
- Rhexius ferrugineus Casey, 1908
- Rhexius insculptus LeConte, 1849
- Rhexius ouachita Chandler, 1990
- Rhexius schmitti Brendel, 1893
- Rhexius stephani Chandler, 1990
- Rhexius substriatus LeConte, 1878
