= Pycnoplectus spinifer =

Scientific classification
- Kingdom: Animalia
- Phylum: Arthropoda
- Class: Insecta
- Order: Coleoptera
- Suborder: Polyphaga
- Infraorder: Staphyliniformia
- Family: Staphylinidae
- Genus: Pycnoplectus
- Species: P. spinifer

Binomial name
- Pycnoplectus spinifer (Casey, 1884)

Species of beetle

Pycnoplectus spinifer is a species of ant-loving beetle in the family Staphylinidae. It is found in North America.
