= Melba sulcatula =

Scientific classification
- Kingdom: Animalia
- Phylum: Arthropoda
- Class: Insecta
- Order: Coleoptera
- Suborder: Polyphaga
- Infraorder: Staphyliniformia
- Family: Staphylinidae
- Genus: Melba
- Species: M. sulcatula

Binomial name
- Melba sulcatula Casey, 1897

Synonyms
- Melba dentipes Raffray, 1904; Melba fossiger Casey, 1897

Species of beetle

Melba sulcatula is a species of ant-loving beetle in the family Staphylinidae. It is found in North America.
