= Corethromyces =

Scientific classification
- Kingdom: Fungi
- Division: Ascomycota
- Class: Laboulbeniomycetes
- Order: Laboulbeniales
- Family: Laboulbeniaceae
- Genus: Corethromyces; Thaxt.

Type species
- Corethromyces cryptobii Thaxt.

Species
- Many, including: Corethromyces cryptobii; Corethromyces elegans

Genus of fungi

Corethromyces is a genus of fungi in the family Laboulbeniaceae. The genus contains 82 species.
