= Hamotus electrae =

Scientific classification
- Kingdom: Animalia
- Phylum: Arthropoda
- Class: Insecta
- Order: Coleoptera
- Suborder: Polyphaga
- Infraorder: Staphyliniformia
- Family: Staphylinidae
- Genus: Hamotus
- Species: H. electrae

Binomial name
- Hamotus electrae Park, 1942

Species of beetle

Hamotus electrae is a species of ant-loving beetle in the family Staphylinidae. It is found in Central America and North America.
