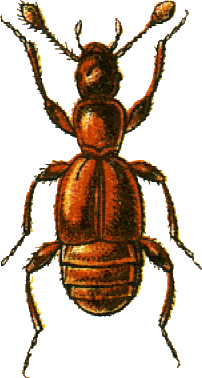

Scientific classification
- Kingdom: Animalia
- Phylum: Arthropoda
- Class: Insecta
- Order: Coleoptera
- Suborder: Polyphaga
- Infraorder: Staphyliniformia
- Family: Staphylinidae
- Genus: Trimium
- Species: T. brevicorne

Binomial name
- Trimium brevicorne (Reichenbach, 1816)

Synonyms
- Trimium discolor LeConte, 1878

= Trimium brevicorne =

Species of beetle

Trimium brevicorne is a species of ant-loving beetle in the family Staphylinidae. It is found in Europe and Northern Asia (excluding China) and North America.
