= Sonoma isabellae =

Scientific classification
- Kingdom: Animalia
- Phylum: Arthropoda
- Clade: Pancrustacea
- Class: Insecta
- Order: Coleoptera
- Suborder: Polyphaga
- Infraorder: Staphyliniformia
- Family: Staphylinidae
- Genus: Sonoma
- Species: S. isabellae

Binomial name
- Sonoma isabellae (LeConte, 1851)

Species of beetle

Sonoma isabellae is a species of ant-loving beetle in the family Staphylinidae. It is found in North America.
