= Melba (beetle) =

Scientific classification
- Kingdom: Animalia
- Phylum: Arthropoda
- Class: Insecta
- Order: Coleoptera
- Suborder: Polyphaga
- Infraorder: Staphyliniformia
- Family: Staphylinidae
- Subfamily: Pselaphinae
- Supertribe: Euplectitae
- Tribe: Trichonychini
- Genus: Melba; Casey, 1897

Genus of beetles

Melba is a genus of ant-loving beetles in the family Staphylinidae. There are about 13 described species in Melba.

== Species ==
These 13 species belong to the genus Melba:

- Melba caviceps Raffray, 1909^{g}
- Melba clypeata (Reitter, 1883)^{i c g}
- Melba crassipes Raffray, 1908^{g}
- Melba fleutiauxi Raffray, 1890^{g}
- Melba frontalis Raffray, 1908^{g}
- Melba gibbula (Reitter, 1883)^{i c g}
- Melba maja (Brendel, 1892)^{i c g}
- Melba parvula (LeConte, 1849)^{i c g b}
- Melba quercae Chandler, 1985^{i c g}
- Melba simplex (LeConte, 1878)^{i c g}
- Melba sulcatula Casey, 1897^{i c g b}
- Melba temporalis Raffray, 1909^{g}
- Melba thoracica (Brendel, 1889)^{i c g}

Data sources: i = ITIS, c = Catalogue of Life, g = GBIF, b = Bugguide.net
