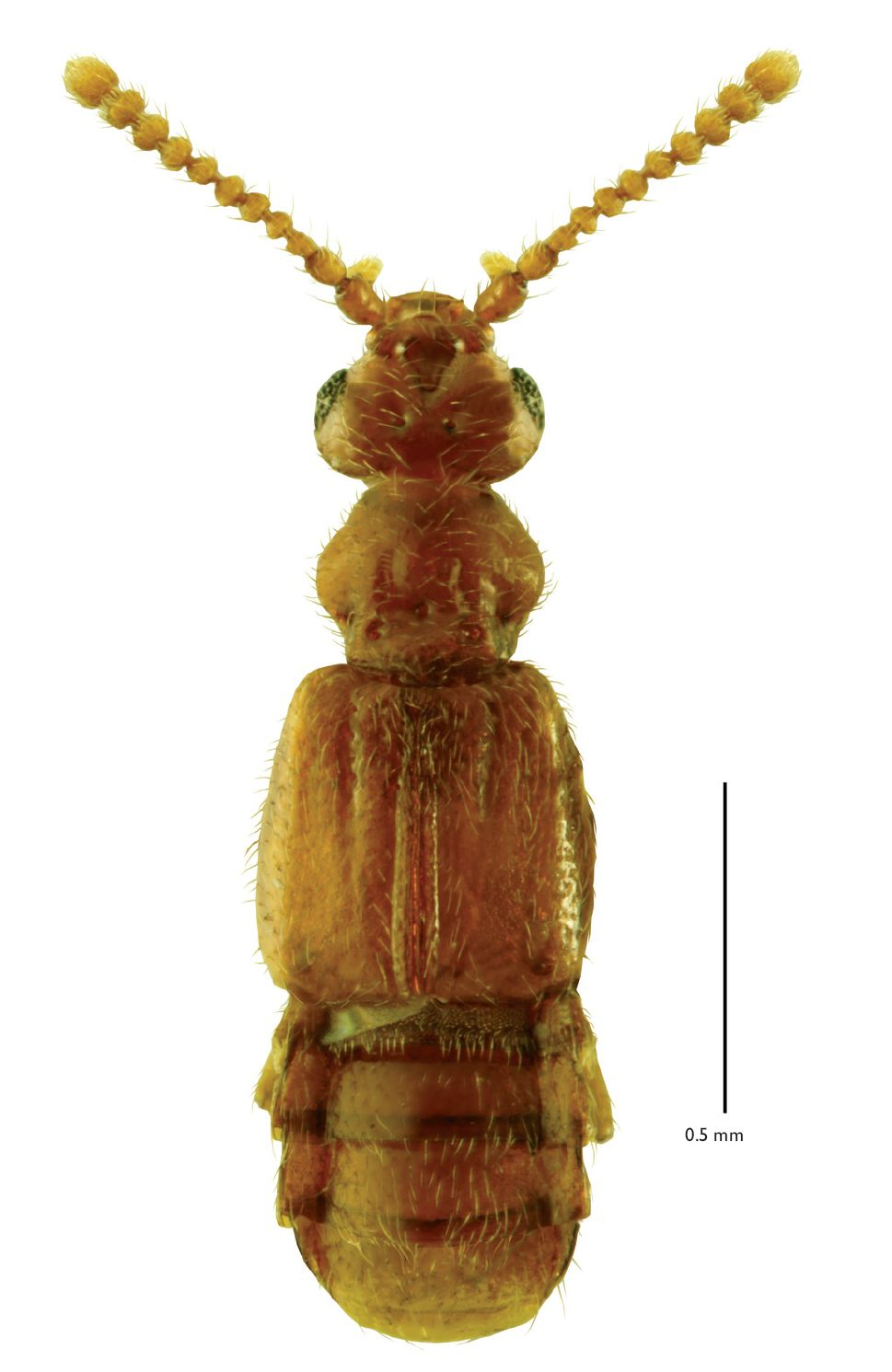
- Sonoma squamishorum

Scientific classification
- Kingdom: Animalia
- Phylum: Arthropoda
- Class: Insecta
- Order: Coleoptera
- Suborder: Polyphaga
- Infraorder: Staphyliniformia
- Family: Staphylinidae
- Supertribe: Faronitae
- Genus: Sonoma; Casey, 1886

= Sonoma (beetle) =

Genus of beetles

Sonoma is a genus of North American rove beetles in the subfamily Pselaphinae. At least 57 species are known—the majority from the Pacific Slope, ranging from Southern California to Alaska—with other species occurring in the Appalachians and the Eastern United States.

== Species ==
These 57 species belong to the genus Sonoma:

- Sonoma agitator Ferro, 2016
- Sonoma baylessae Ferro and Carlton, 2010
- Sonoma brasstownensis Ferro and Carlton, 2010
- Sonoma cardiac Ferro, 2016
- Sonoma carltoni Ferro, 2016
- Sonoma cascadia Chandler, 1986^{i c g}
- Sonoma cataloochee Ferro, 2016
- Sonoma caterinoi Ferro, 2016
- Sonoma cavifrons Casey, 1887^{i c g}
- Sonoma chandleri Ferro, 2016
- Sonoma chouljenkoi Ferro and Carlton, 2010
- Sonoma cobra Ferro, 2016
- Sonoma colberti Ferro, 2016
- Sonoma conifera Chandler, 1986^{i c g}
- Sonoma corticina Casey, 1887^{i c g}
- Sonoma cuneata Marsh and Schuster, 1962^{i c g}
- Sonoma cygnus Ferro and Carlton, 2010
- Sonoma dilopha Marsh and Schuster, 1962^{i c g}
- Sonoma dolabra Marsh and Schuster, 1962^{i c g}
- Sonoma gilae Ferro and Carlton, 2010
- Sonoma gimmeli Ferro and Carlton, 2010
- Sonoma grandiceps Casey, 1894^{i c g}
- Sonoma hespera Park and Wagner, 1962^{i c g}
- Sonoma holmesi Ferro and Carlton, 2010
- Sonoma humilis Marsh and Schuster, 1962^{i c g}
- Sonoma isabellae (LeConte, 1851)^{i c g b}
- Sonoma konkoworum Chandler, 2003^{i c g}
- Sonoma margemina Park and Wagner, 1962^{i c g}
- Sonoma maryae Ferro, 2016
- Sonoma mayori Ferro and Carlton, 2010
- Sonoma nhunguyeni Ferro and Carlton, 2010
- Sonoma nicholsae Ferro and Carlton, 2010
- Sonoma olycalida Park and Wagner, 1962^{i c g}
- Sonoma parkorum Ferro and Carlton, 2010
- Sonoma parviceps (Mäklin, 1852)^{i c g b}
- Sonoma petersi Chandler, 1986^{i c g}
- Sonoma priocera Marsh and Schuster, 1962^{i c g}
- Sonoma quellazaire Ferro, 2016
- Sonoma quercicola Chandler, 1986^{i c g}
- Sonoma repanda Marsh and Schuster, 1962^{i c g}
- Sonoma rossellinae Ferro, 2016
- Sonoma rubida Casey, 1894^{i c g}
- Sonoma russelli Chandler, 1986^{i c g}
- Sonoma sokolovi Ferro and Carlton, 2010
- Sonoma spadica Marsh and Schuster, 1962^{i c g}
- Sonoma squamishorum Chandler and Klimaszewski, 2009
- Sonoma stewarti Ferro, 2016
- Sonoma streptophorophallus Ferro and Carlton, 2010
- Sonoma tehamae Chandler, 2003^{i c g}
- Sonoma tishechkini Ferro and Carlton, 2010
- Sonoma tolulae (LeConte, 1849)^{i c g}
- Sonoma tridens Ferro and Carlton, 2010
- Sonoma triloba Marsh and Schuster, 1962^{i c g}
- Sonoma twaini Ferro, 2016
- Sonoma vanna Marsh and Schuster, 1962^{i c g}
- Sonoma virgo Ferro, 2016
- Sonoma wintuorum Chandler, 2003^{i c g}

Data sources: i = ITIS, c = Catalogue of Life, g = GBIF, b = Bugguide.net
