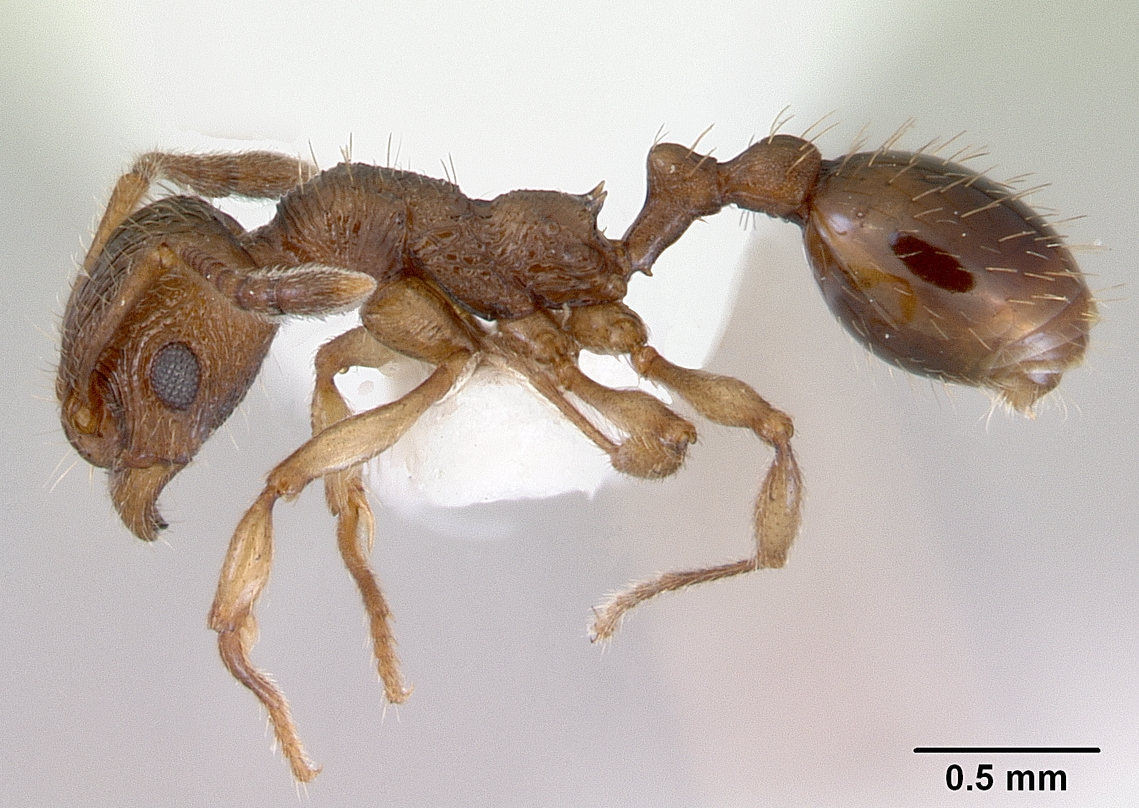
- Huberia brounii worker

Scientific classification
- Kingdom: Animalia
- Phylum: Arthropoda
- Class: Insecta
- Order: Hymenoptera
- Family: Formicidae
- Subfamily: Myrmicinae
- Genus: Huberia
- Species: H. brounii

Binomial name
- Huberia brounii Forel, 1895

= Huberia brounii =

Species of ant

Huberia brounii is a species of ant in the genus Huberia, endemic to New Zealand.

== Taxonomy ==
Huberia brounii was described in 1895 by Auguste Forel from a single queen collected in Rotorua.

== Etymology ==
The species name "brounii" refers to Thomas Broun who collected the holotype.

== Distribution and habitat ==
Huberia brounii is endemic to New Zealand. The species is widespread throughout both the North Island and the South Island in native forests. Like Huberia striata, it likely has a preference for Nothofagus dominated forests.

== See also ==
- Huberia striata, the single other species of the genus
