= Pseudactium arcuatum =

Scientific classification
- Kingdom: Animalia
- Phylum: Arthropoda
- Class: Insecta
- Order: Coleoptera
- Suborder: Polyphaga
- Infraorder: Staphyliniformia
- Family: Staphylinidae
- Genus: Pseudactium
- Species: P. arcuatum

Binomial name
- Pseudactium arcuatum (LeConte, 1849)

Species of beetle

Pseudactium arcuatum is a species of ant-loving beetle in the family Staphylinidae. It is found in North America.
