= Faronitae =

Scientific classification
- Kingdom: Animalia
- Phylum: Arthropoda
- Clade: Pancrustacea
- Class: Insecta
- Order: Coleoptera
- Suborder: Polyphaga
- Infraorder: Staphyliniformia
- Family: Staphylinidae
- Subfamily: Pselaphinae
- Supertribe: Faronitae; Reitter, 1882

Supertribe of rove beetles

Faronitae is a supertribe of rove beetles in the subfamily Pselaphinae. It was first described in 1882 by Reitter. It contains 390 accepted species, split between 33 genera.

== Genera ==
- Ahnea
- Aucklandea
- Australosagola
- Brounea
- Chandlerea
- Cretasonoma
- Delenda
- Exeirarthra
- Faronidiellus
- Faronidius
- Faronites
- Faronitopsis
- Faronus
- Golasa
- Golasidius
- Golasina
- Golasites
- Leschenea
- Logasa
- Megarafonus
- Nornalup
- Nugaculus
- Nunnea
- Parafaronus
- Porongurup
- Prosagola
- Pseudoexeriarthra
- Pseudostenosagola
- Sagola
- Salagosa
- Salagosita
- Sonoma
- Stenosagola
