= Thesiastes debilis =

Scientific classification
- Kingdom: Animalia
- Phylum: Arthropoda
- Class: Insecta
- Order: Coleoptera
- Suborder: Polyphaga
- Infraorder: Staphyliniformia
- Family: Staphylinidae
- Genus: Thesiastes
- Species: T. debilis

Binomial name
- Thesiastes debilis (LeConte, 1878)

Synonyms
- Thesiastes planipennis (Brendel, 1889); Thesiastes tenuis (LeConte, 1878)

Species of beetle

Thesiastes debilis is a species of ant-loving beetle in the family Staphylinidae. It is found in North America.
