= Conoplectus canaliculatus =

Scientific classification
- Kingdom: Animalia
- Phylum: Arthropoda
- Class: Insecta
- Order: Coleoptera
- Suborder: Polyphaga
- Infraorder: Staphyliniformia
- Family: Staphylinidae
- Genus: Conoplectus
- Species: C. canaliculatus

Binomial name
- Conoplectus canaliculatus (LeConte, 1849)

Synonyms
- Conoplectus sylvaticus (Raffray, 1890); Rhexius simplex Motschulsky, 1856

Species of beetle

Conoplectus canaliculatus is a species of ant-loving beetle in the family Staphylinidae. It is found in North America.
