= Fustiger fuchsii =

Scientific classification
- Kingdom: Animalia
- Phylum: Arthropoda
- Class: Insecta
- Order: Coleoptera
- Suborder: Polyphaga
- Infraorder: Staphyliniformia
- Family: Staphylinidae
- Genus: Fustiger
- Species: F. fuchsii

Binomial name
- Fustiger fuchsii Brendel, 1866

Synonyms
- Fustiger californicus (Brendel, 1889)

Species of beetle

Fustiger fuchsii is a species of ant-loving beetle in the family Staphylinidae. It is found in North America.
