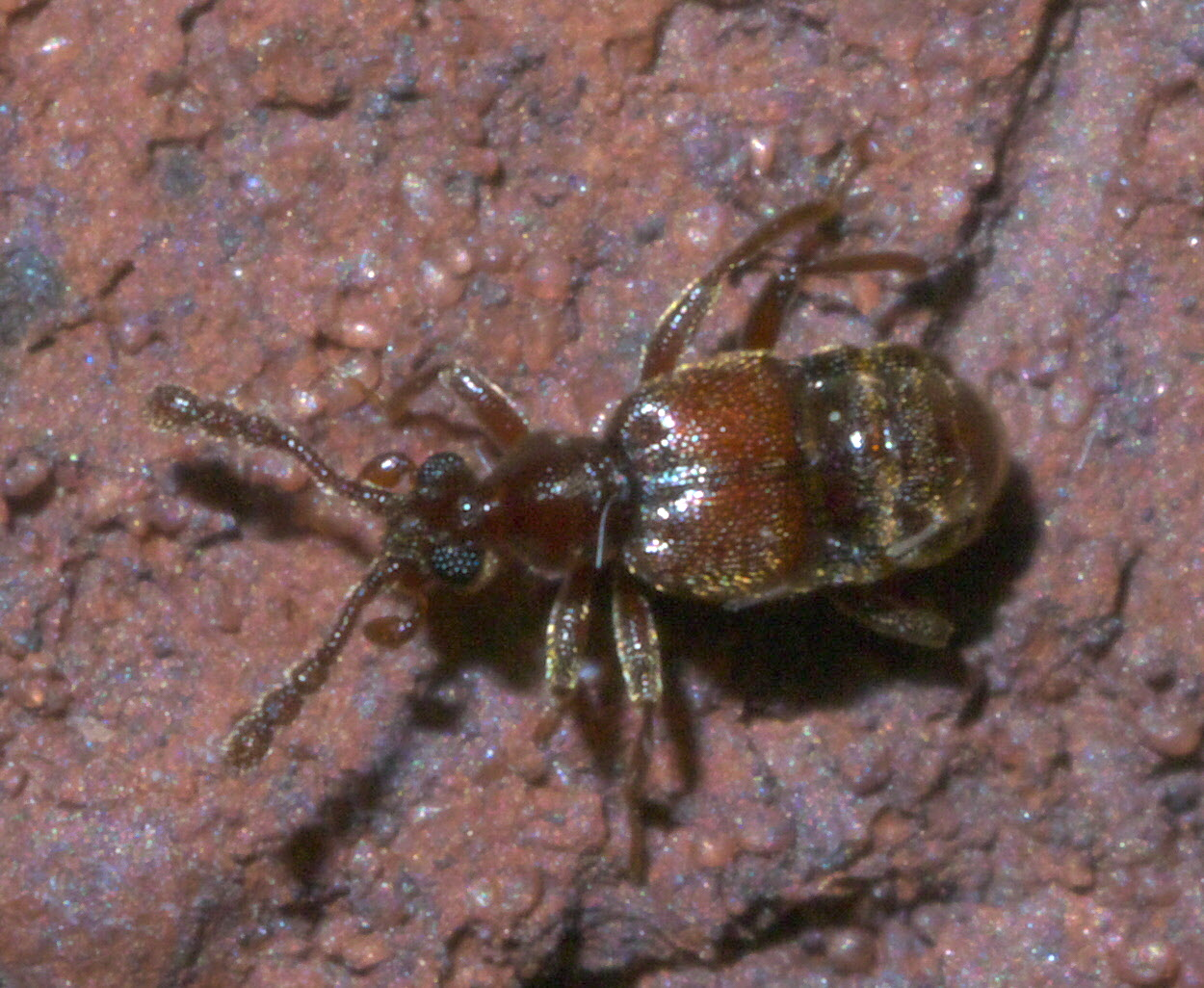

Scientific classification
- Kingdom: Animalia
- Phylum: Arthropoda
- Class: Insecta
- Order: Coleoptera
- Suborder: Polyphaga
- Infraorder: Staphyliniformia
- Family: Staphylinidae
- Genus: Hamotus
- Species: H. opimus

Binomial name
- Hamotus opimus Fletcher, 1932

= Hamotus opimus =

Species of beetle

Hamotus opimus is a species of ant-loving beetle in the family Staphylinidae. It is found in North America.
