= Cylindrarctus crinifer =

Scientific classification
- Kingdom: Animalia
- Phylum: Arthropoda
- Class: Insecta
- Order: Coleoptera
- Suborder: Polyphaga
- Infraorder: Staphyliniformia
- Family: Staphylinidae
- Genus: Cylindrarctus
- Species: C. crinifer

Binomial name
- Cylindrarctus crinifer Casey, 1894

Species of beetle

Cylindrarctus crinifer is a species of ant-loving beetle in the family Staphylinidae. It is found in North America.
