= Fustiger =

Scientific classification
- Kingdom: Animalia
- Phylum: Arthropoda
- Class: Insecta
- Order: Coleoptera
- Suborder: Polyphaga
- Infraorder: Staphyliniformia
- Family: Staphylinidae
- Subfamily: Pselaphinae
- Genus: Fustiger; LeConte, 1866

Synonyms
- Afrofustiger Jeannel, 1952; Commatocerus Raffray, 1882; Pseudfustiger Reitter, 1884

Genus of beetles

Fustiger is a genus of ant-loving beetles in the family Staphylinidae. There are at least 3 described species in Fustiger.

== Species ==
- Fustiger fuchsii Brendel, 1866
- Fustiger knausii Schaeffer, 1906
- Fustiger stricticornis (Reitter, 1883)
