= Dalmosanus steevesi =

Scientific classification
- Kingdom: Animalia
- Phylum: Arthropoda
- Class: Insecta
- Order: Coleoptera
- Suborder: Polyphaga
- Infraorder: Staphyliniformia
- Family: Staphylinidae
- Genus: Dalmosanus
- Species: D. steevesi

Binomial name
- Dalmosanus steevesi (Schuster & Grigarick, 1968)

Species of beetle

Dalmosanus steevesi is a species of ant-loving beetle in the family Staphylinidae. It is found in North America.
