= Mipseltyrus nicolayi =

Scientific classification
- Kingdom: Animalia
- Phylum: Arthropoda
- Class: Insecta
- Order: Coleoptera
- Suborder: Polyphaga
- Infraorder: Staphyliniformia
- Family: Staphylinidae
- Genus: Mipseltyrus
- Species: M. nicolayi

Binomial name
- Mipseltyrus nicolayi Park, 1953

Species of beetle

Mipseltyrus nicolayi is a species of ant-loving beetle in the family Staphylinidae. It is found in North America.
