= Melba parvula =

Scientific classification
- Kingdom: Animalia
- Phylum: Arthropoda
- Class: Insecta
- Order: Coleoptera
- Suborder: Polyphaga
- Infraorder: Staphyliniformia
- Family: Staphylinidae
- Genus: Melba
- Species: M. parvula

Binomial name
- Melba parvula (LeConte, 1849)

Synonyms
- Melba durum (Brendel, 1892); Melba gracile (Brendel, 1892); Melba laticolle (Brendel, 1892); Melba texana Casey, 1897; Melba uniformis Casey, 1897

Species of beetle

Melba parvula is a species of ant-loving beetle in the family Staphylinidae. It is found in North America.
