= Oropus cavicauda =

Scientific classification
- Kingdom: Animalia
- Phylum: Arthropoda
- Class: Insecta
- Order: Coleoptera
- Suborder: Polyphaga
- Infraorder: Staphyliniformia
- Family: Staphylinidae
- Genus: Oropus
- Species: O. cavicauda

Binomial name
- Oropus cavicauda Casey, 1894

Synonyms
- Oropus fenderi Park and Wagner, 1962; Oropus minimus Chandler, 1983; Oropus schusteri Schuster and Grigarick, 1960

Species of beetle

Oropus cavicauda is a species of ant-loving beetle in the family Staphylinidae. It is found in North America.
