= Conoplectus acornus =

Scientific classification
- Kingdom: Animalia
- Phylum: Arthropoda
- Class: Insecta
- Order: Coleoptera
- Suborder: Polyphaga
- Infraorder: Staphyliniformia
- Family: Staphylinidae
- Genus: Conoplectus
- Species: C. acornus

Binomial name
- Conoplectus acornus Carlton, 1983

Species of beetle

Conoplectus acornus is a species of beetle, first discovered by Christopher E. Carlton in 1983. No sub-species mentioned in the Catalogue of Life.
