= Bibloporus =

Scientific classification
- Kingdom: Animalia
- Phylum: Arthropoda
- Class: Insecta
- Order: Coleoptera
- Suborder: Polyphaga
- Infraorder: Staphyliniformia
- Family: Staphylinidae
- Subfamily: Pselaphinae
- Genus: Bibloporus; Thomson, 1859

Genus of beetles

Bibloporus is a genus of beetle belonging to the family Staphylinidae.

The genus was first described by Thomson in 1859.

The species of this genus are found in Europe.

Species:

- Bibloporus bicolor (Denny, 1825)
