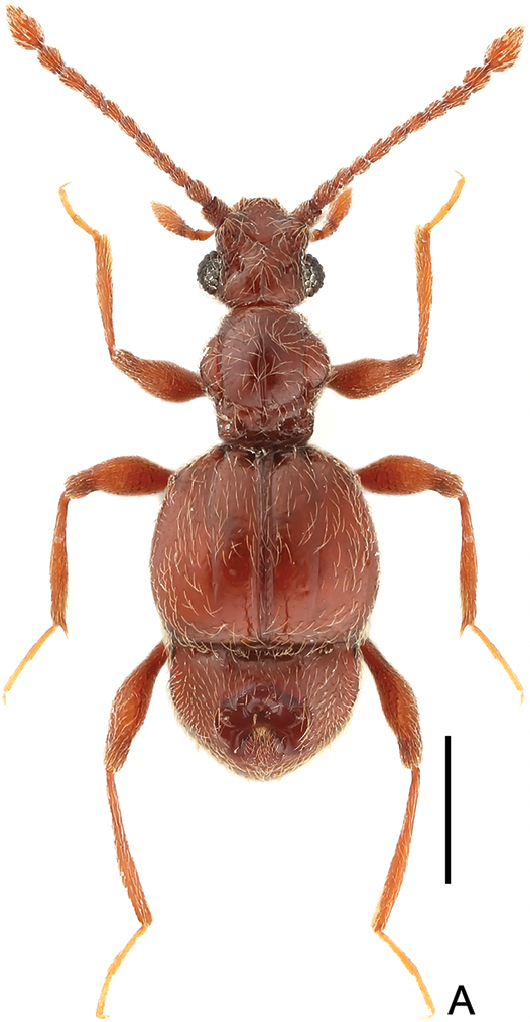
- Male member of Arthromelodes choui, scale bar: 0.5 mm

Scientific classification
- Kingdom: Animalia
- Phylum: Arthropoda
- Class: Insecta
- Order: Coleoptera
- Suborder: Polyphaga
- Infraorder: Staphyliniformia
- Family: Staphylinidae
- Genus: Arthromelodes
- Species: A. choui

Binomial name
- Arthromelodes choui Yin, 2018

= Arthromelodes choui =

Species of beetle

Arthromelodes choui is a species of beetle belonging to the rove beetle family. Specimens have been collected from northern Taitung, Taiwan.

== Etymology ==
The specific name choui is in honor of the Taiwanese specialist of the Cerambycidae, Wen-I Chou.

== Description ==
Males range from 2.09–2.22 mm in length. Male bodies are reddish-brown. The head and pronotum are sparsely punctate, and the abdomen slightly narrower than the elytra.
