= Nisaxis tomentosa =

Scientific classification
- Kingdom: Animalia
- Phylum: Arthropoda
- Class: Insecta
- Order: Coleoptera
- Suborder: Polyphaga
- Infraorder: Staphyliniformia
- Family: Staphylinidae
- Genus: Nisaxis
- Species: N. tomentosa

Binomial name
- Nisaxis tomentosa (Aubé, 1833)

Synonyms
- Nisaxis cincinnata Casey, 1887; Nisaxis minuta (Brendel, 1865)

Species of beetle

Nisaxis tomentosa is a species of ant-loving beetle in the family Staphylinidae. It is found in the Caribbean Sea, North America, and South America.
