= Rhexidius incomptus =

Scientific classification
- Kingdom: Animalia
- Phylum: Arthropoda
- Class: Insecta
- Order: Coleoptera
- Suborder: Polyphaga
- Infraorder: Staphyliniformia
- Family: Staphylinidae
- Genus: Rhexidius
- Species: R. incomptus

Binomial name
- Rhexidius incomptus Schuster & Grigarick, 1962

Species of beetle

Rhexidius incomptus is a species of ant-loving beetle in the family Staphylinidae. It is found in North America.
