= Arthromelodes =

Scientific classification
- Domain: Eukaryota
- Kingdom: Animalia
- Phylum: Arthropoda
- Class: Insecta
- Order: Coleoptera
- Suborder: Polyphaga
- Infraorder: Staphyliniformia
- Family: Staphylinidae
- Subfamily: Pselaphinae
- Genus: Arthromelodes; Jeannel, 1954

Species
- See text

Synonyms
- Pseudobatriscenus Jeannel, 1958

Genus of beetle

Arthromelodes is a genus of beetle belonging to the rove beetle family.

== Species ==
The following species are accepted within Arthromelodes:

- Arthromelodes aizuanus Nomura, 1991
- Arthromelodes cariei Jeannel, 1954
- Arthromelodes choui Nomura, 1991
- Arthromelodes corniventris Nomura, 1991
- Arthromelodes crucifer Nomura, 1991
- Arthromelodes daibosatsuanus Nomura, 1991
  - Arthromelodes daibosatsuanus daibosatsuanus
  - Arthromelodes daibosatsuanus fujimontanus
  - Arthromelodes daibosatsuanus shiranemontanus
- Arthromelodes dilatatus (Raffray, 1909)
- Arthromelodes giganteus Nomura, 1991
- Arthromelodes gyoja Nomura, 1991
- Arthromelodes hikosanus Nomura, 1991
- Arthromelodes kiiensis Nomura, 1991
- Arthromelodes loebli Nomura, 1991
- Arthromelodes mercurius Nomura, 1991
- Arthromelodes optatus (Sharp, 1874)
- Arthromelodes pilicollis Nomura, 1991
- Arthromelodes punctifrons Nomura, 1991
- Arthromelodes saikaiensis Nomura, 1991
- Arthromelodes sinuatipes Nomura, 1991
- Arthromelodes thysanoventris Nomura, 1991
- Arthromelodes watanabei S. Arai, 2002
