= Eutyphlus dybasi =

Scientific classification
- Kingdom: Animalia
- Phylum: Arthropoda
- Class: Insecta
- Order: Coleoptera
- Suborder: Polyphaga
- Infraorder: Staphyliniformia
- Family: Staphylinidae
- Genus: Eutyphlus
- Species: E. dybasi

Binomial name
- Eutyphlus dybasi Park, 1956

Species of beetle

Eutyphlus dybasi is a species of ant-loving beetle in the family Staphylinidae. It is found in North America.
