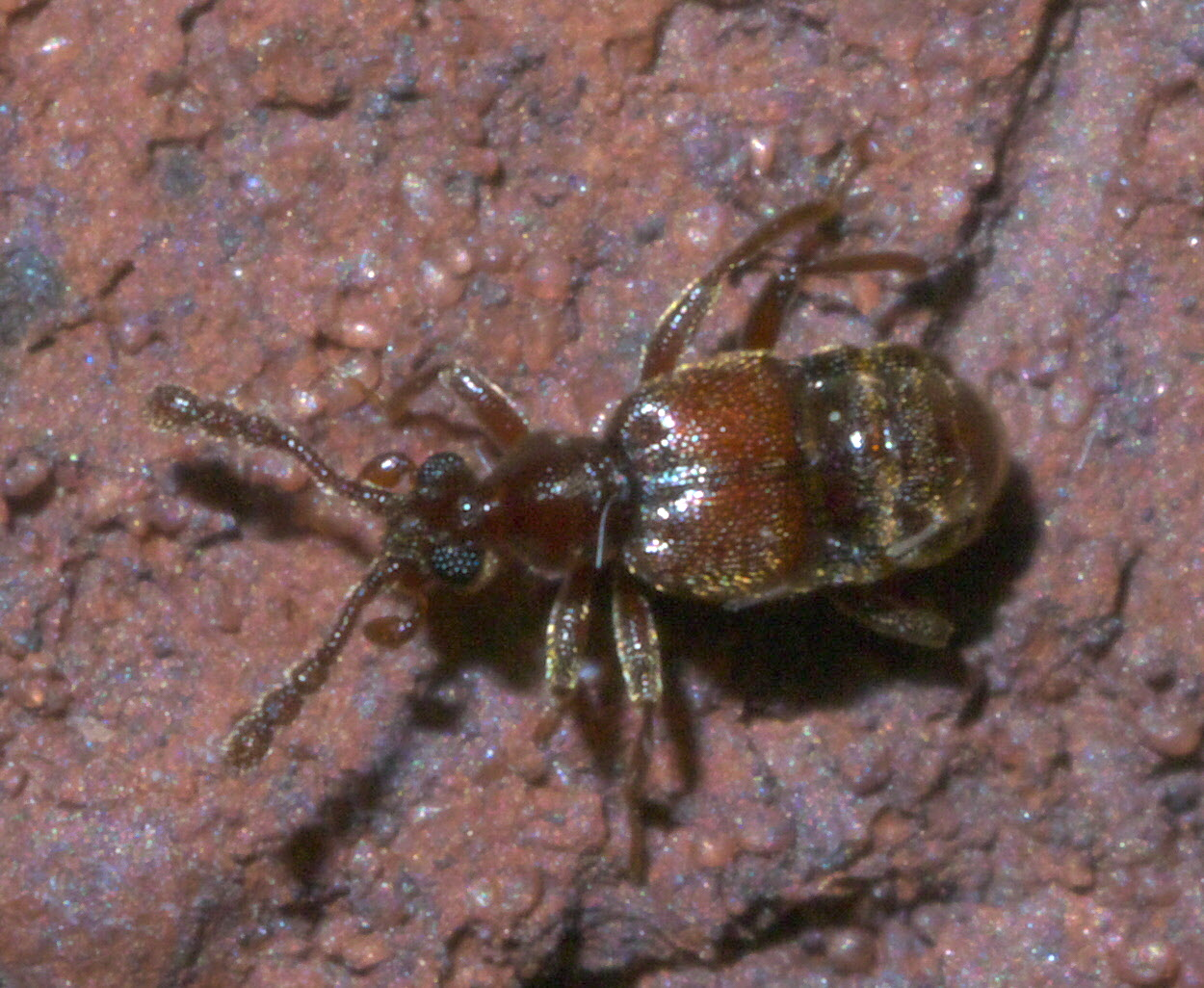
- Hamotus opimus

Scientific classification
- Kingdom: Animalia
- Phylum: Arthropoda
- Class: Insecta
- Order: Coleoptera
- Suborder: Polyphaga
- Infraorder: Staphyliniformia
- Family: Staphylinidae
- Tribe: Tyrini
- Genus: Hamotus; Aubé, 1844

= Hamotus =

Genus of beetles

Hamotus is a genus of ant-loving beetles in the family Staphylinidae. There are about nine described species in Hamotus.

== Species ==
These nine species belong to the genus Hamotus:

- Hamotus electrae Park, 1942
- Hamotus elongatus (Brendel, 1890)
- Hamotus hirtus Raffray, 1905
- Hamotus latericius Aubé, 1844
- Hamotus nodicollis Raffray, 1883
- Hamotus opimus Fletcher, 1932
- Hamotus populus Chandler, 1974
- Hamotus sanguinipes Schaufuss, 1888
- Hamotus soror Raffray, 1904
