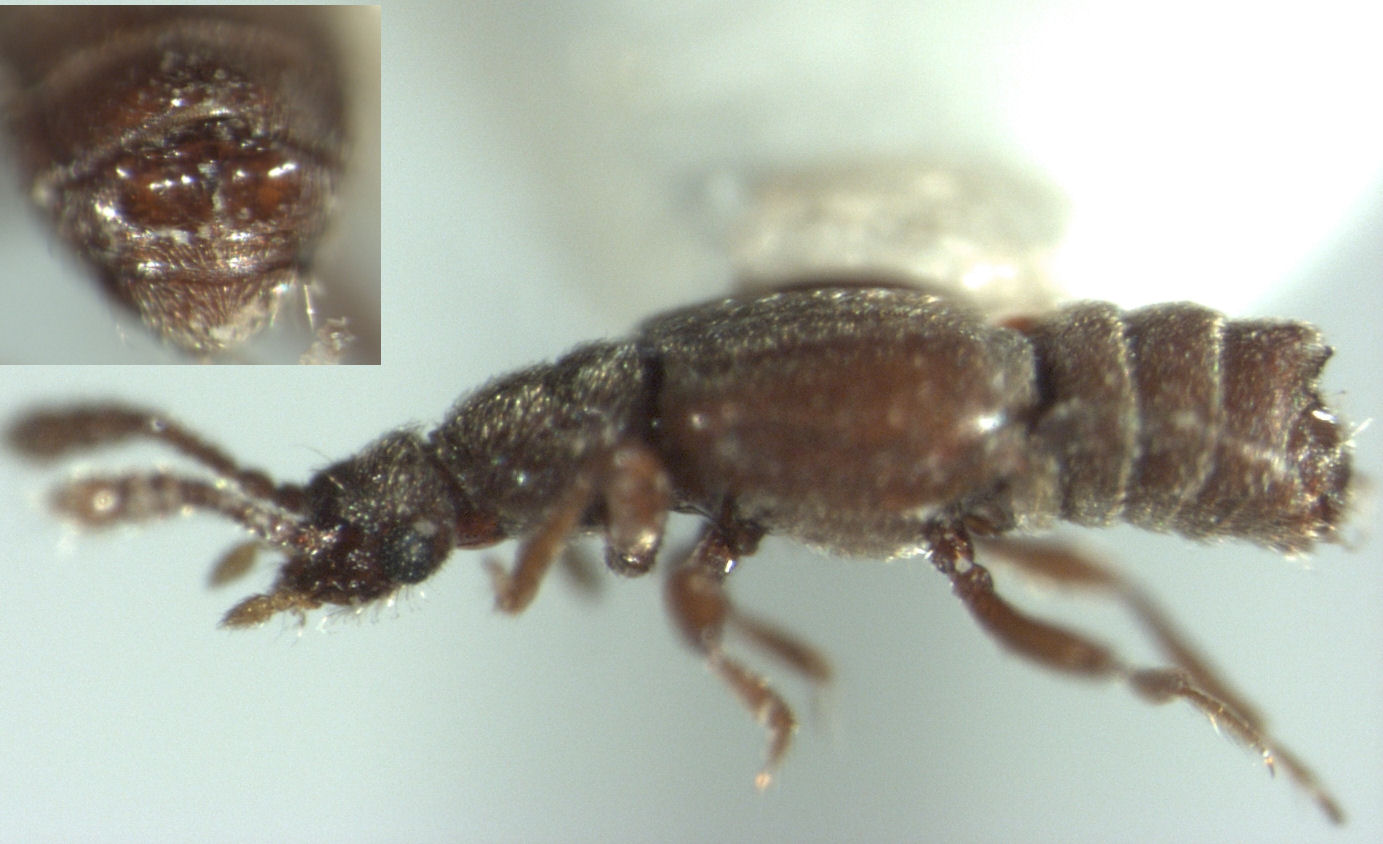

Scientific classification
- Kingdom: Animalia
- Phylum: Arthropoda
- Class: Insecta
- Order: Coleoptera
- Suborder: Polyphaga
- Infraorder: Staphyliniformia
- Family: Staphylinidae
- Supertribe: Euplectitae
- Tribe: Euplectini
- Genus: Euplectus; Leach, 1817

Synonyms
- Endoplectus Jeannel, 1956; Euplectinus Jeannel, 1954; Euplectoides Raffray, 1910

= Euplectus =

Genus of beetles

Euplectus is a genus of ant-loving beetles in the family Staphylinidae. There are about 13 described species in Euplectus.

== Species ==
- Euplectus acomanus Casey, 1908
- Euplectus californicus Casey, 1887
- Euplectus confluens LeConte, 1849
- Euplectus duryi Casey, 1908
- Euplectus elongatus Brendel, 1893
- Euplectus episcopalis Park, in Park, Wagner and Sanderson, 1976
- Euplectus filiformis (Casey, 1908)
- Euplectus idahoensis Park and Wagner, 1962
- Euplectus karsteni (Reichenbach, 1816)
- Euplectus karstenii (Reichenbach, 1816)
- Euplectus longicollis Casey, 1884
- Euplectus signatus (Reichenbach, 1816)
- Euplectus silvicolus Chandler, 1986
