= Pycnoplectus =

Scientific classification
- Kingdom: Animalia
- Phylum: Arthropoda
- Class: Insecta
- Order: Coleoptera
- Suborder: Polyphaga
- Infraorder: Staphyliniformia
- Family: Staphylinidae
- Supertribe: Euplectitae
- Tribe: Euplectini
- Genus: Pycnoplectus; Casey, 1897

Genus of beetles

Pycnoplectus is a genus of ant-loving beetles in the family Staphylinidae. There are about 11 described species in Pycnoplectus.

== Species ==
These 11 species belong to the genus Pycnoplectus:

- Pycnoplectus cediosus Wagner, 1975
- Pycnoplectus congener (Casey, 1884)
- Pycnoplectus difficilis (LeConte, 1849)
- Pycnoplectus falcatus Wagner, 1975
- Pycnoplectus infossus (Raffray, 1904)
- Pycnoplectus interruptus (LeConte, 1849)
- Pycnoplectus linearis (LeConte, 1849)
- Pycnoplectus longipennis Casey, 1908
- Pycnoplectus parki Wagner, 1975
- Pycnoplectus sexualis (Casey, 1884)
- Pycnoplectus spinifer (Casey, 1884)
