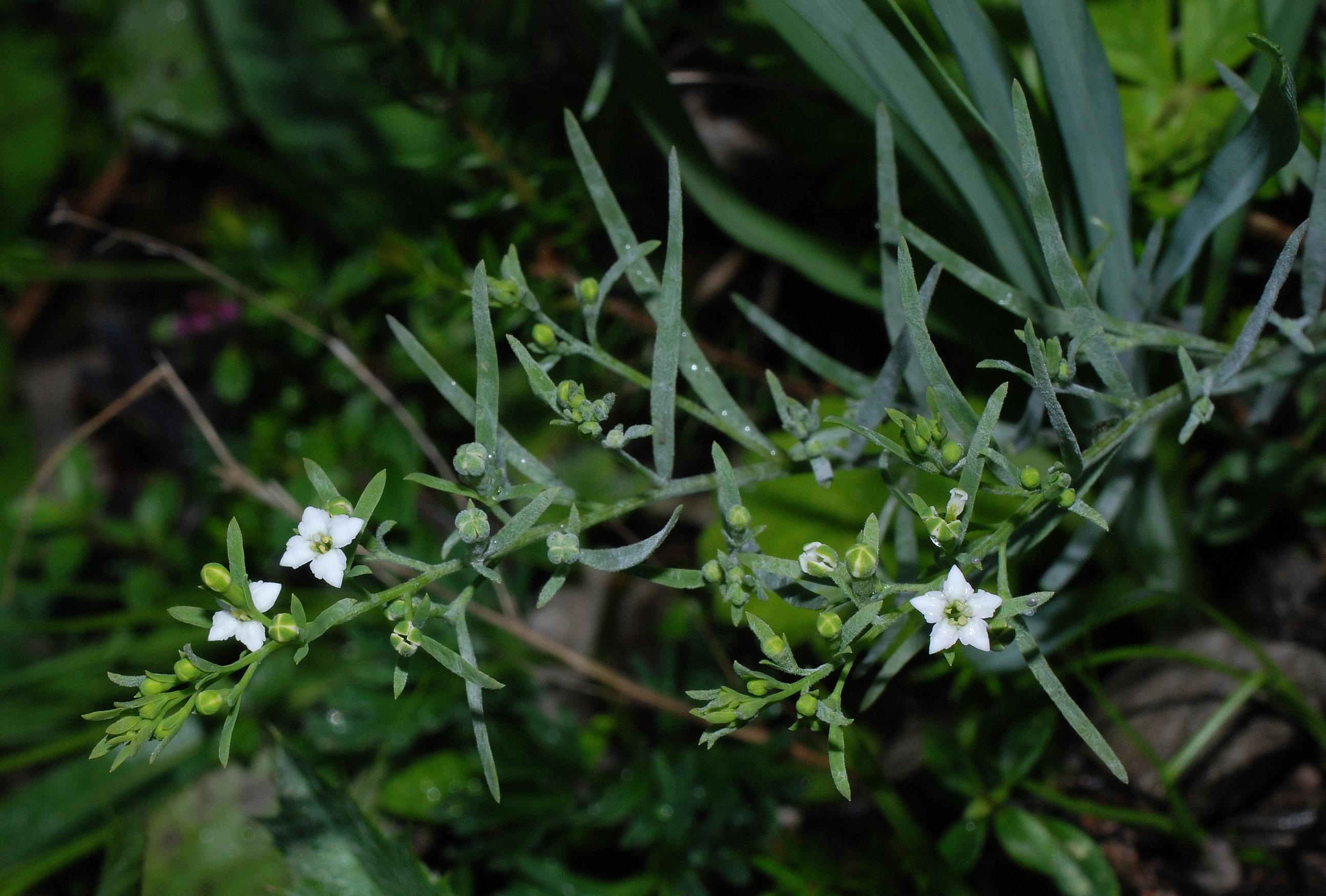
- Thesium alpinum

Scientific classification
- Kingdom: Animalia
- Phylum: Arthropoda
- Class: Insecta
- Order: Coleoptera
- Suborder: Polyphaga
- Infraorder: Staphyliniformia
- Family: Staphylinidae
- Supertribe: Euplectitae
- Tribe: Trichonychini
- Subtribe: Panaphantina
- Genus: Thesium; Casey, 1884

Synonyms
- Apothinus Sharp, 1887

= Thesium (beetle) =

Genus of beetles

Thesium is a genus of ant-loving beetles in the family Staphylinidae. There are at least two described species in Thesium.

== Species ==
These two species belong to the genus Thesium:

- Thesium cavifrons (LeConte, 1863)^{i c g}
- Thesium pearcei Park in Park, Wagner and Sanderson, 1976^{i c g}

Data sources: i = ITIS, c = Catalogue of Life, g = GBIF, b = Bugguide.net
