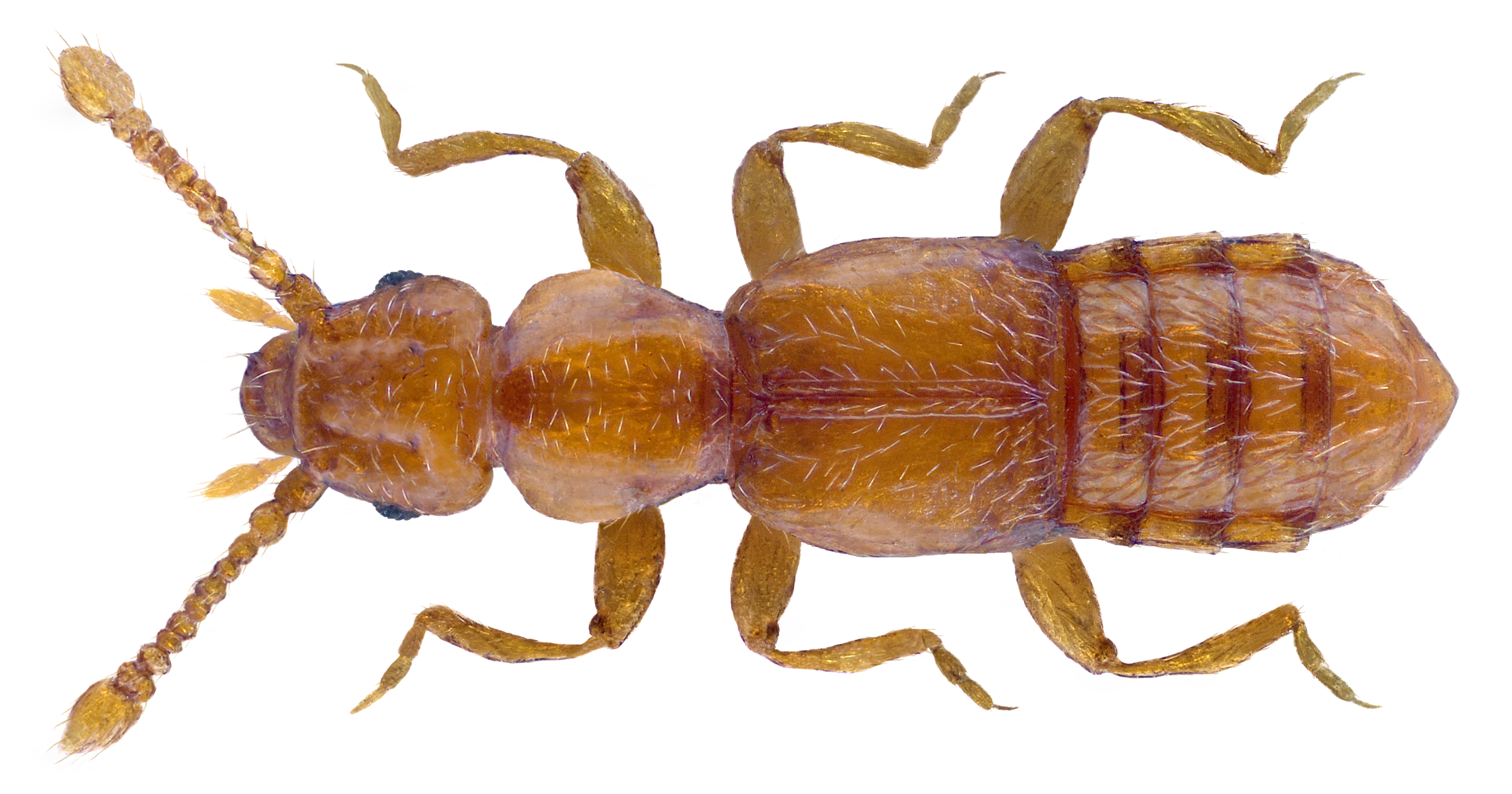

Scientific classification
- Kingdom: Animalia
- Phylum: Arthropoda
- Class: Insecta
- Order: Coleoptera
- Suborder: Polyphaga
- Infraorder: Staphyliniformia
- Family: Staphylinidae
- Genus: Plectophloeus; Reitter, 1891

= Plectophloeus =

Genus of beetles

Plectophloeus is a genus of beetles belonging to the family Staphylinidae.

The species of this genus are found in Europe.

Species:

- Plectophloeus binaghii Besuchet, 1964
- Plectophloeus carpathicus (Reitter, 1882)
