= Dalmosanus =

Scientific classification
- Kingdom: Animalia
- Phylum: Arthropoda
- Class: Insecta
- Order: Coleoptera
- Suborder: Polyphaga
- Infraorder: Staphyliniformia
- Family: Staphylinidae
- Supertribe: Euplectitae
- Tribe: Trichonychini
- Subtribe: Trimiina
- Genus: Dalmosanus; Park, 1952

Synonyms
- Pygmactium Schuster and Grigarick, 1968

Genus of beetles

Dalmosanus is a genus of ant-loving beetles in the family Staphylinidae. There are at least three described species in Dalmosanus.

== Species ==
These three species belong to the genus Dalmosanus:

- Dalmosanus mollyae (Park, 1956)
- Dalmosanus quercavum (Chandler, 1990)
- Dalmosanus steevesi (Schuster & Grigarick, 1968)
