= Cylindrarctus =

Scientific classification
- Kingdom: Animalia
- Phylum: Arthropoda
- Class: Insecta
- Order: Coleoptera
- Suborder: Polyphaga
- Infraorder: Staphyliniformia
- Family: Staphylinidae
- Tribe: Tychini
- Genus: Cylindrarctus; Schaufuss, 1887

Genus of beetles

Cylindrarctus is a genus of ant-loving beetles in the family Staphylinidae. There are about 10 described species in Cylindrarctus.

== Species ==
These 10 species belong to the genus Cylindrarctus:

- Cylindrarctus americanus Schaufuss, 1887
- Cylindrarctus bicornis Chandler, 1988
- Cylindrarctus crinifer Casey, 1894
- Cylindrarctus fluvialis Chandler, 1988
- Cylindrarctus longipalpis (LeConte, 1849)
- Cylindrarctus ludovicianus (Brendel, 1893)
- Cylindrarctus obrieni Chandler, 1988
- Cylindrarctus onaga Chandler, 1988
- Cylindrarctus orientalis Chandler, 1988
- Cylindrarctus seminole Chandler, 1999
