= Megarafonus =

Scientific classification
- Kingdom: Animalia
- Phylum: Arthropoda
- Class: Insecta
- Order: Coleoptera
- Suborder: Polyphaga
- Infraorder: Staphyliniformia
- Family: Staphylinidae
- Supertribe: Faronitae
- Genus: Megarafonus; Casey, 1897

Genus of beetles

Megarafonus is a genus of ant-loving beetles in the family Staphylinidae. There are about seven described species in Megarafonus.

== Species ==
These seven species belong to the genus Megarafonus:

- Megarafonus haigi Chandler, 2003
- Megarafonus lajuneae Chandler, 2003
- Megarafonus lentus Schuster & Marsh, 1958
- Megarafonus mancus Schuster & Marsh, 1958
- Megarafonus parvus Schuster & Marsh, 1958
- Megarafonus ventralis Casey, 1897
- Megarafonus yahiorum (Chandler, 1983)
