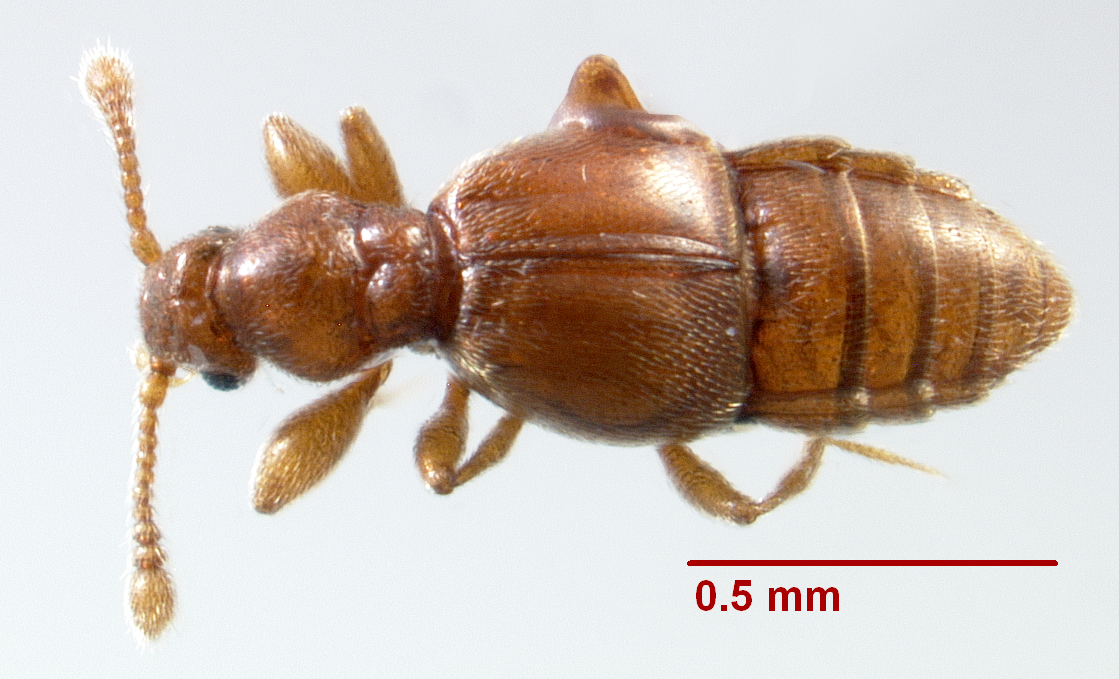

Scientific classification
- Kingdom: Animalia
- Phylum: Arthropoda
- Class: Insecta
- Order: Coleoptera
- Suborder: Polyphaga
- Infraorder: Staphyliniformia
- Family: Staphylinidae
- Genus: Trimioplectus
- Species: T. obsoletus

Binomial name
- Trimioplectus obsoletus Brendel, 1891

= Trimioplectus obsoletus =

Species of beetle

Trimioplectus obsoletus is a species of ant-loving beetle in the family Staphylinidae. It is found in North America. The species was first described in 1891 by Emil Brendel
