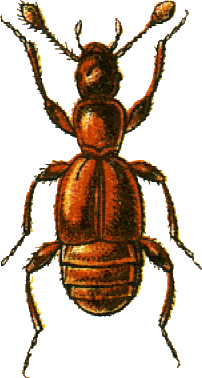
- Trimium brevicorne

Scientific classification
- Kingdom: Animalia
- Phylum: Arthropoda
- Class: Insecta
- Order: Coleoptera
- Suborder: Polyphaga
- Infraorder: Staphyliniformia
- Family: Staphylinidae
- Supertribe: Euplectitae
- Tribe: Trichonychini
- Subtribe: Trimiina
- Genus: Trimium; Aubé, 1833

= Trimium =

Genus of beetles

Trimium is a genus of ant-loving beetles in the family Staphylinidae. There are more than 20 described species in Trimium.

== Species ==
These 27 species belong to the genus Trimium:

- Trimium aemonae Reitter, 1881
- Trimium amplipenne Reitter, 1908
- Trimium asturicum Dodero, 1919
- Trimium atticum Besuchet, 1969
- Trimium besucheti Sabella, 1989
- Trimium brevicorne (Reichenbach, 1816)
- Trimium carpathicum Saulcy, 1875
- Trimium caucasicum Kolenati, 1846
- Trimium cavicolle Reitter, 1881
- Trimium diecki Reitter, 1882
- Trimium expandum Reitter, 1884
- Trimium foveicolle LeConte, 1878
- Trimium graecum Karaman, 1969
- Trimium hopffgarteni Reitter, 1881
- Trimium illyricum Besuchet, 1969
- Trimium imitatum Reitter, 1881
- Trimium karamani Reitter, 1913
- Trimium latiusculum Reitter, 1879
- Trimium libani J.Sahlberg, 1908
- Trimium lichtneckerti Machulka, 1949
- Trimium minimum Dodero, 1900
- Trimium paganettii Reitter, 1906
- Trimium puncticeps Reitter, 1881
- Trimium puncticolle LeConte, 1878
- Trimium raffrayi Guillebeau, 1890
- Trimium thessalicum Karaman, 1967
- Trimium zoufali Krauss, 1900
