= Bibloplectus =

Scientific classification
- Kingdom: Animalia
- Phylum: Arthropoda
- Class: Insecta
- Order: Coleoptera
- Suborder: Polyphaga
- Infraorder: Staphyliniformia
- Family: Staphylinidae
- Subfamily: Pselaphinae
- Genus: Bibloplectus

Genus of beetles

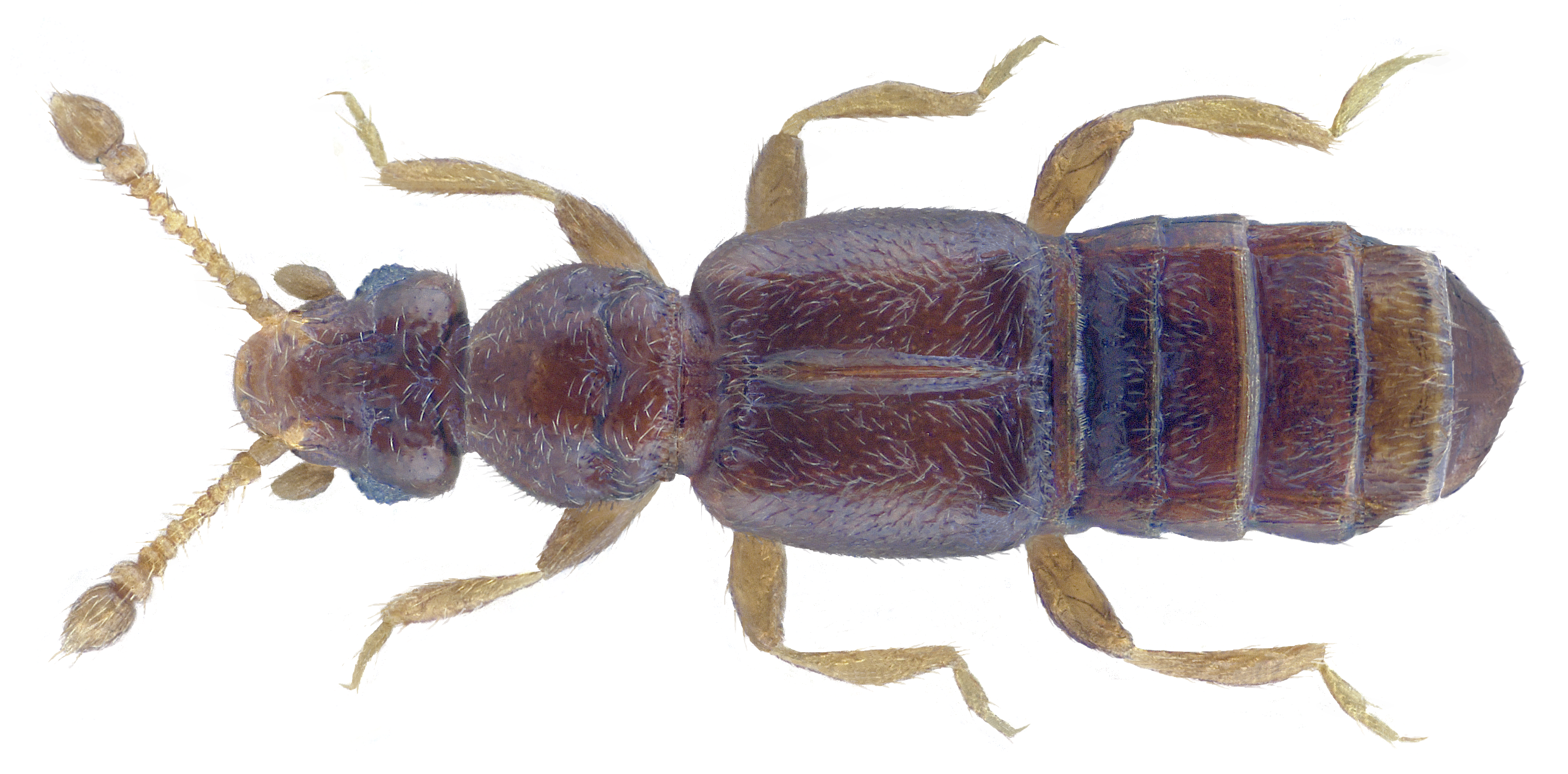
Bibloplectus ambiguus

Bibloplectus is a genus of ant-loving beetles in the family Staphylinidae. There are at least 10 described species in Bibloplectus.

== Species ==
- Bibloplectus cherokee Chandler, 1990
- Bibloplectus chickasaw Chandler, 1990
- Bibloplectus choctaw Chandler, 1990
- Bibloplectus creek Chandler, 1990
- Bibloplectus exilis Bowman, 1934
- Bibloplectus integer (LeConte, 1878)
- Bibloplectus leviceps (Casey, 1884)
- Bibloplectus osage Chandler, 1990
- Bibloplectus ruficeps (Motschulsky, 1856)
- Bibloplectus sobrinus Casey, 1897
