= Sebaga =

Scientific classification
- Kingdom: Animalia
- Phylum: Arthropoda
- Class: Insecta
- Order: Coleoptera
- Suborder: Polyphaga
- Infraorder: Staphyliniformia
- Family: Staphylinidae
- Supertribe: Euplectitae
- Genus: Sebaga; Raffray, 1891

Genus of beetles

Sebaga is a genus of ant-loving beetles in the family Staphylinidae. There is one described species in Sebaga, S. ocampi.
