= Pseudactium =

Scientific classification
- Kingdom: Animalia
- Phylum: Arthropoda
- Class: Insecta
- Order: Coleoptera
- Suborder: Polyphaga
- Infraorder: Staphyliniformia
- Family: Staphylinidae
- Supertribe: Euplectitae
- Tribe: Trichonychini
- Subtribe: Panaphantina
- Genus: Pseudactium; Casey, 1908

Synonyms
- Racemia Newton and Chandler, 1989

Genus of beetles

Pseudactium is a genus of ant-loving beetles in the family Staphylinidae. There are about 12 described species in Pseudactium.

== Species ==
These 12 species belong to the genus Pseudactium:

- Pseudactium alexanderi Carlton & Chandler, 1994
- Pseudactium arcuatum (LeConte, 1849)
- Pseudactium carolinae Casey, 1908
- Pseudactium copelandi Carlton & Chandler, 1994
- Pseudactium magazinensis Carlton & Chandler, 1994
- Pseudactium mellinum Casey
- Pseudactium mendicum (Park, 1962)
- Pseudactium parabolicum (Brendel, 1893)
- Pseudactium pecki Carlton & Chandler, 1994
- Pseudactium stannardi Carlton & Chandler, 1994
- Pseudactium steevesi Carlton & Chandler, 1994
- Pseudactium ursum Carlton, 1995
