= Leptoplectus =

Scientific classification
- Kingdom: Animalia
- Phylum: Arthropoda
- Class: Insecta
- Order: Coleoptera
- Suborder: Polyphaga
- Infraorder: Staphyliniformia
- Family: Staphylinidae
- Supertribe: Euplectitae
- Tribe: Euplectini
- Genus: Leptoplectus; Casey, 1908

Synonyms
- Archeuplectus Jeannel, 1952; Grammoplectus Jeannel, 1950

Genus of beetles

Leptoplectus is a genus of ant-loving beetles in the family Staphylinidae. There are at least four described species in Leptoplectus.

== Species ==
These four species belong to the genus Leptoplectus:

- Leptoplectus perraulti Besuchet, 1993
- Leptoplectus pertenuis (Casey, 1884)
- Leptoplectus remyi (Jeannel, 1961)
- Leptoplectus spinolae (Aubé, 1844)
