= Oropus (beetle) =

Scientific classification
- Kingdom: Animalia
- Phylum: Arthropoda
- Class: Insecta
- Order: Coleoptera
- Suborder: Polyphaga
- Infraorder: Staphyliniformia
- Family: Staphylinidae
- Supertribe: Euplectitae
- Tribe: Trogastrini
- Subtribe: Trogastrina
- Genus: Oropus; Casey, 1886

Genus of beetles

Oropus is a genus of ant-loving beetles in the family Staphylinidae. There are at least 20 described species in Oropus.

== Species ==
These 29 species belong to the genus Oropus:

- Oropus abbreviatus Casey, 1886
- Oropus acriculus Schuster and Grigarick, 1960
- Oropus acumenis Schuster and Grigarick, 1960
- Oropus basalis Casey, 1908
- Oropus castaneus Casey, 1908
- Oropus cavicauda Casey, 1894
- Oropus convexus Casey, 1886
- Oropus cristatus Schuster and Grigarick, 1960
- Oropus curtipennis Casey, 1908
- Oropus cyranus Schuster and Grigarick, 1960
- Oropus debilis Casey, 1908
- Oropus delimatus Schuster and Grigarick, 1960
- Oropus grigaricki Chandler, 1983
- Oropus helferi Grigarick and Schuster, 1962
- Oropus interruptus Casey, 1886
- Oropus macneilli Schuster and Grigarick, 1960
- Oropus magnidens Schuster and Grigarick, 1960
- Oropus micropthalmus Chandler, 1986
- Oropus montanus Casey, 1887
- Oropus obtusus Schuster and Grigarick, 1960
- Oropus orbatus Schuster and Grigarick, 1960
- Oropus pectinis Schuster and Grigarick, 1960
- Oropus sinifundus Schuster and Grigarick, 1960
- Oropus striatus (LeConte, 1874)
- Oropus testaceus Casey, 1908
- Oropus tuberculatus Schuster and Grigarick, 1960
- Oropus umbraticus Schuster and Grigarick, 1960
- Oropus vellosus Schuster and Grigarick, 1960
- Oropus verrucifundus Schuster and Grigarick, 1960
