= Eutyphlus =

Scientific classification
- Kingdom: Animalia
- Phylum: Arthropoda
- Class: Insecta
- Order: Coleoptera
- Suborder: Polyphaga
- Infraorder: Staphyliniformia
- Family: Staphylinidae
- Supertribe: Euplectitae
- Tribe: Trichonychini
- Subtribe: Panaphantina
- Genus: Eutyphlus; LeConte, 1880

Synonyms
- Nicotheus Casey, 1884

Genus of beetles

Eutyphlus is a genus of ant-loving beetles in the family Staphylinidae. There are about five described species in Eutyphlus.

== Species ==
These five species belong to the genus Eutyphlus:

- Eutyphlus dybasi Park, 1956
- Eutyphlus prominens Casey, 1894
- Eutyphlus schmitti Raffray, 1904
- Eutyphlus similis LeConte, 1880
- Eutyphlus thoracicus Park, 1956
