= Nisaxis =

Scientific classification
- Kingdom: Animalia
- Phylum: Arthropoda
- Class: Insecta
- Order: Coleoptera
- Suborder: Polyphaga
- Infraorder: Staphyliniformia
- Family: Staphylinidae
- Tribe: Brachyglutini
- Genus: Nisaxis; Casey, 1886

Genus of beetles

Nisaxis is a genus of ant-loving beetles in the family Staphylinidae. There are at least four described species in Nisaxis.

== Species ==
These four species belong to the genus Nisaxis:

- Nisaxis caudata Schaeffer, 1905
- Nisaxis maritima Casey, 1887
- Nisaxis parviceps Casey, 1897
- Nisaxis tomentosa (Aubé, 1833)
