= Euboarhexius =

Scientific classification
- Kingdom: Animalia
- Phylum: Arthropoda
- Class: Insecta
- Order: Coleoptera
- Suborder: Polyphaga
- Infraorder: Staphyliniformia
- Family: Staphylinidae
- Supertribe: Euplectitae
- Tribe: Trogastrini
- Subtribe: Trogastrina
- Genus: Euboarhexius; Grigarick & Schuster, 1966

Genus of beetles

Euboarhexius is a genus of ant-loving beetles in the family Staphylinidae. There are at least four described species in Euboarhexius.

== Species ==
These four species belong to the genus Euboarhexius:

- Euboarhexius dybasi Carlton & Allen, 1986
- Euboarhexius perscitus (Fletcher, 1932)
- Euboarhexius sinus Grigarick & Schuster, 1966
- Euboarhexius trogasteroides (Brendel, 1892)
