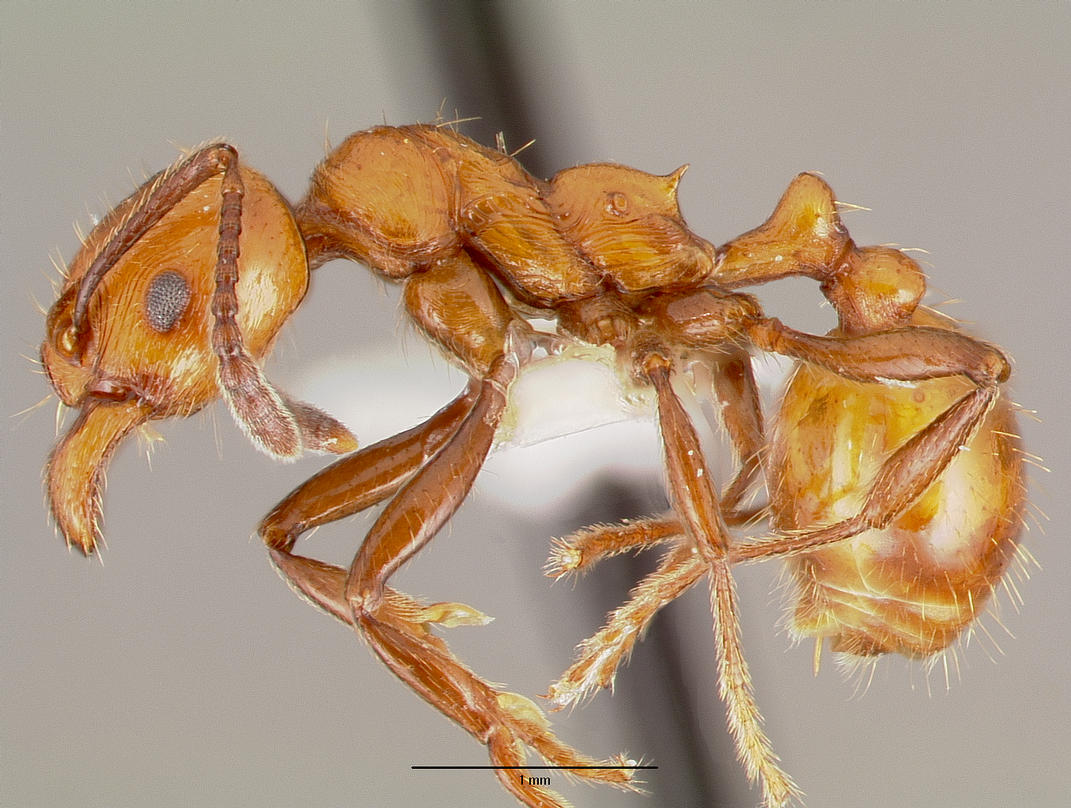
- Huberia striata worker from New Zealand

Scientific classification
- Domain: Eukaryota
- Kingdom: Animalia
- Phylum: Arthropoda
- Class: Insecta
- Order: Hymenoptera
- Family: Formicidae
- Subfamily: Myrmicinae
- Tribe: Crematogastrini
- Genus: Huberia; Forel, 1890

Type species
- Tetramorium striatum Smith, 1876

Diversity
- 2 species

= Huberia (ant) =

Genus of ants

Huberia is a genus of ants in the subfamily Myrmicinae. The genus contains two species endemic to New Zealand.

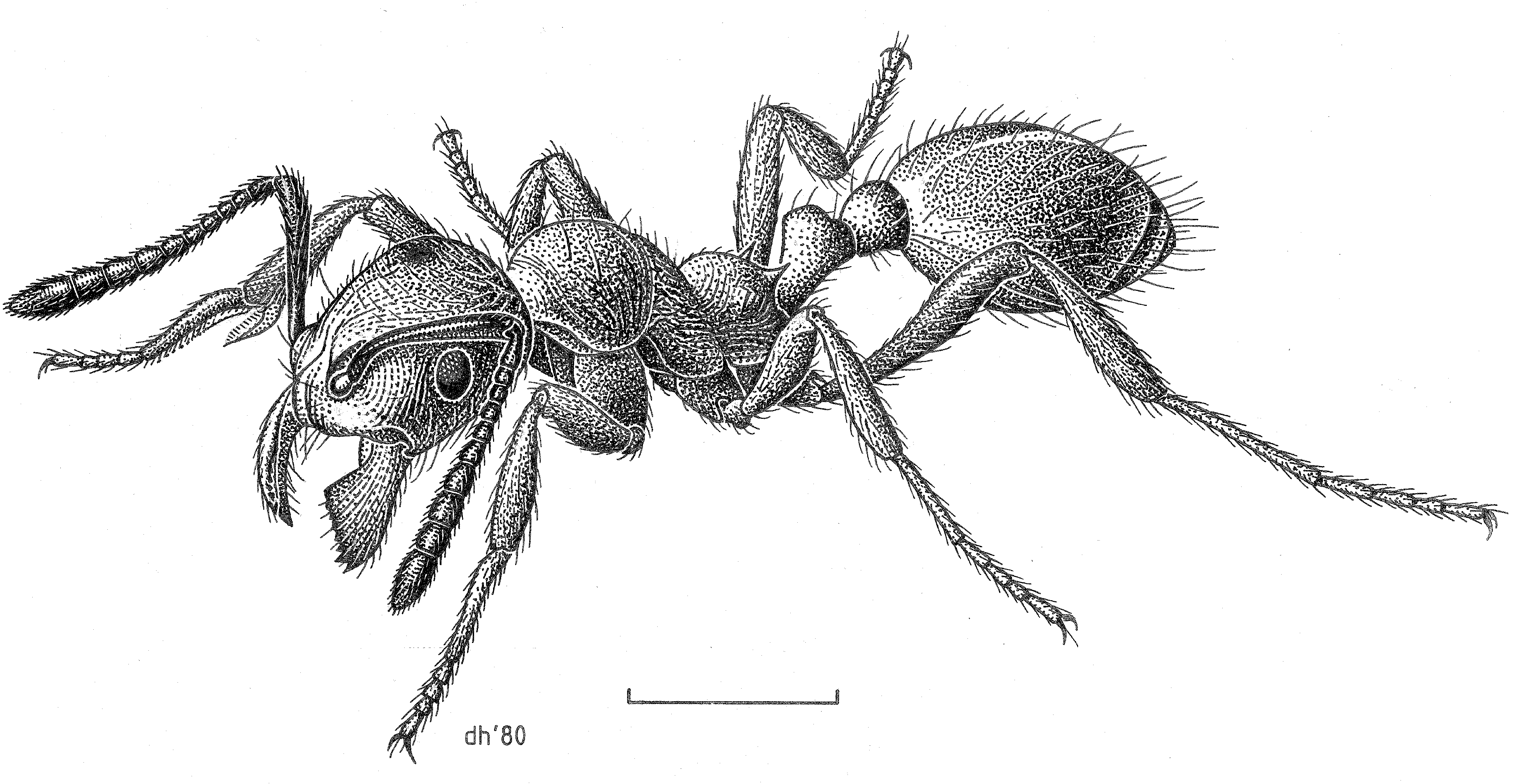
Huberia striata

== Species ==
- Huberia brounii Forel, 1895
- Huberia striata (Smith, 1876)

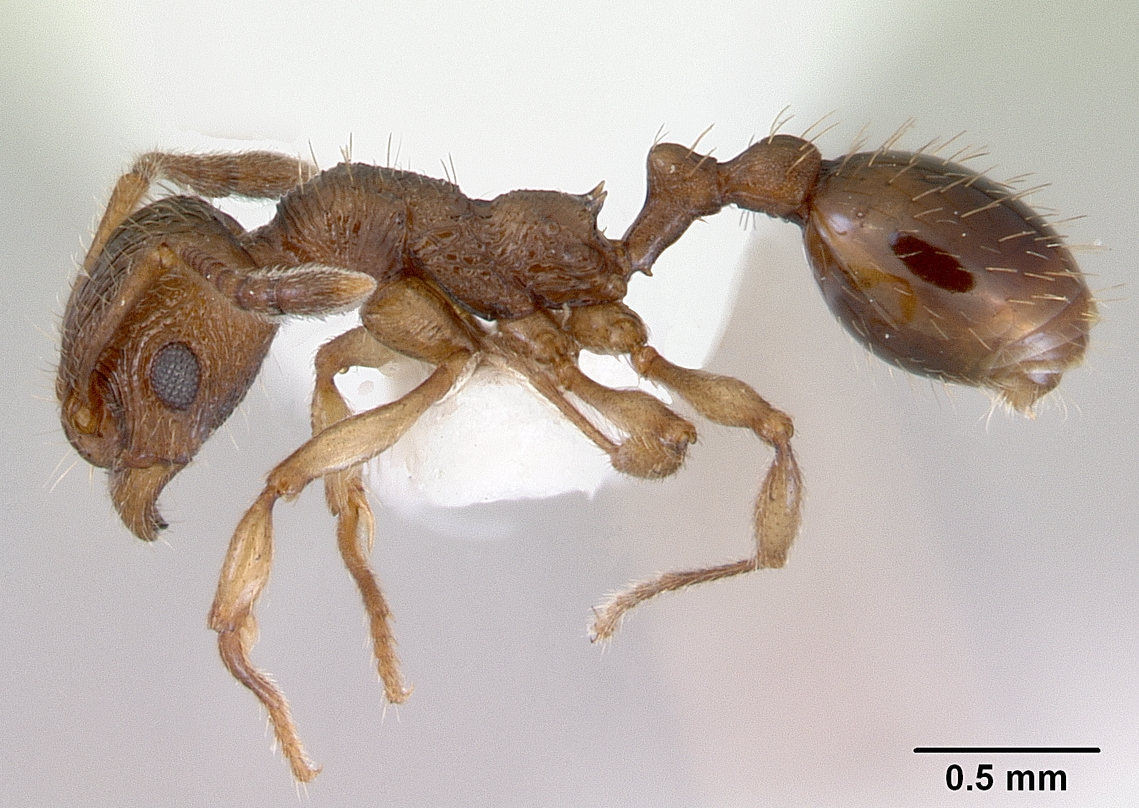
Huberia brounii
