= Morius =

Scientific classification
- Kingdom: Animalia
- Phylum: Arthropoda
- Class: Insecta
- Order: Coleoptera
- Suborder: Polyphaga
- Infraorder: Staphyliniformia
- Family: Staphylinidae
- Tribe: Trichonychini
- Genus: Morius; Casey, 1894

Genus of beetles

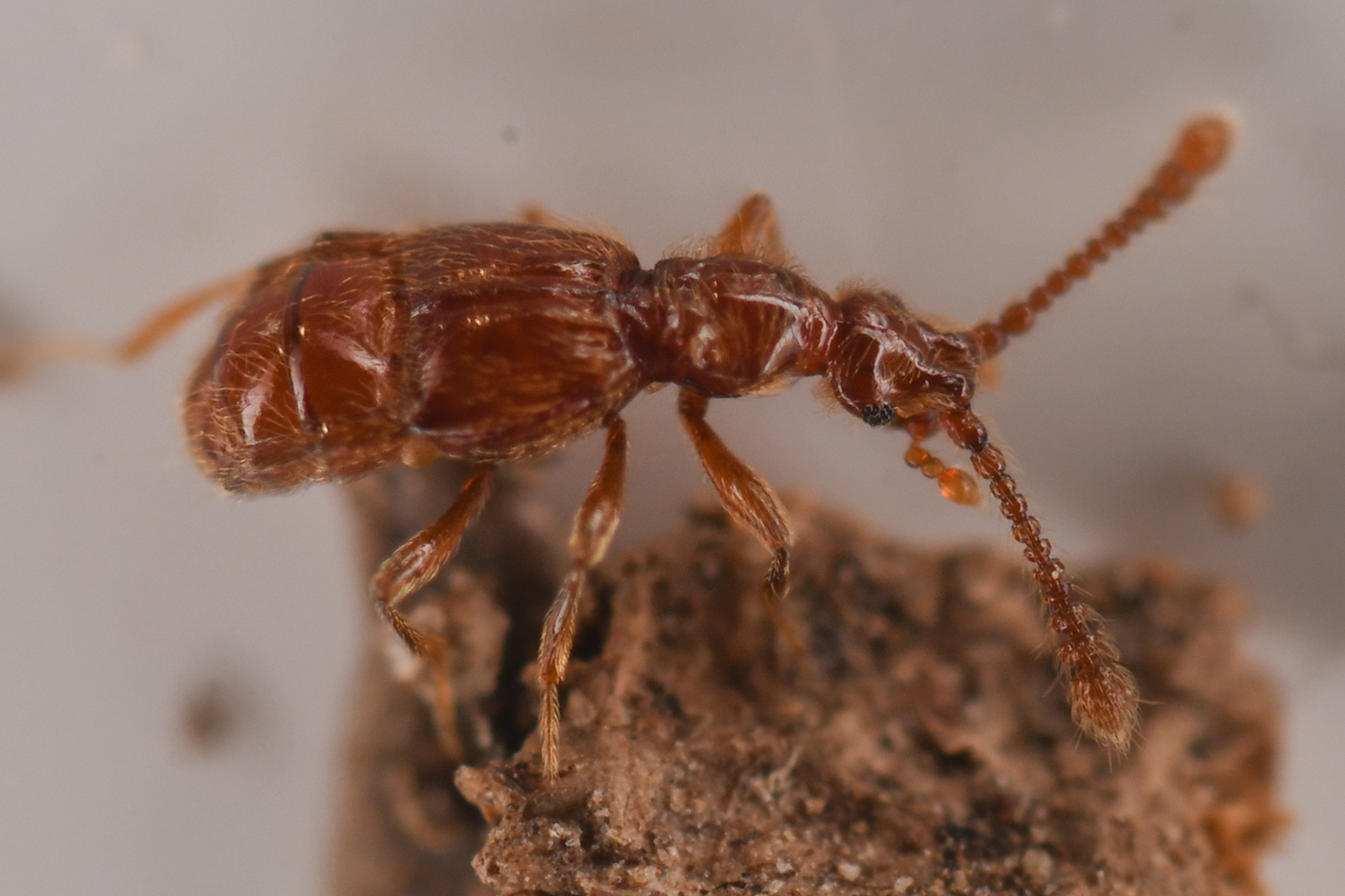
image of Morius occidens

Morius is a genus of ant-loving beetles in the family Staphylinidae. There is one described species in Morius, M. occidens.
