= Actiastes =

Scientific classification
- Kingdom: Animalia
- Phylum: Arthropoda
- Class: Insecta
- Order: Coleoptera
- Suborder: Polyphaga
- Infraorder: Staphyliniformia
- Family: Staphylinidae
- Tribe: Trichonychini
- Genus: Actiastes; Casey, 1897

Genus of beetles

Actiastes is a genus of ant-loving beetles in the family Staphylinidae. There are about nine described species in Actiastes.

== Species ==
These nine species belong to the genus Actiastes:

- Actiastes desertorum Grigarick & Schuster, 1971
- Actiastes foveicollis (LeConte, 1878)
- Actiastes fovicinus Grigarick & Schuster, 1971
- Actiastes fundatum Grigarick & Schuster, 1971
- Actiastes globifer (LeConte, 1849)
- Actiastes globiferum (LeConte, 1849)
- Actiastes spatium Grigarick & Schuster, 1971
- Actiastes suteri (Park, 1963)
- Actiastes wagneri (Park, 1963)
