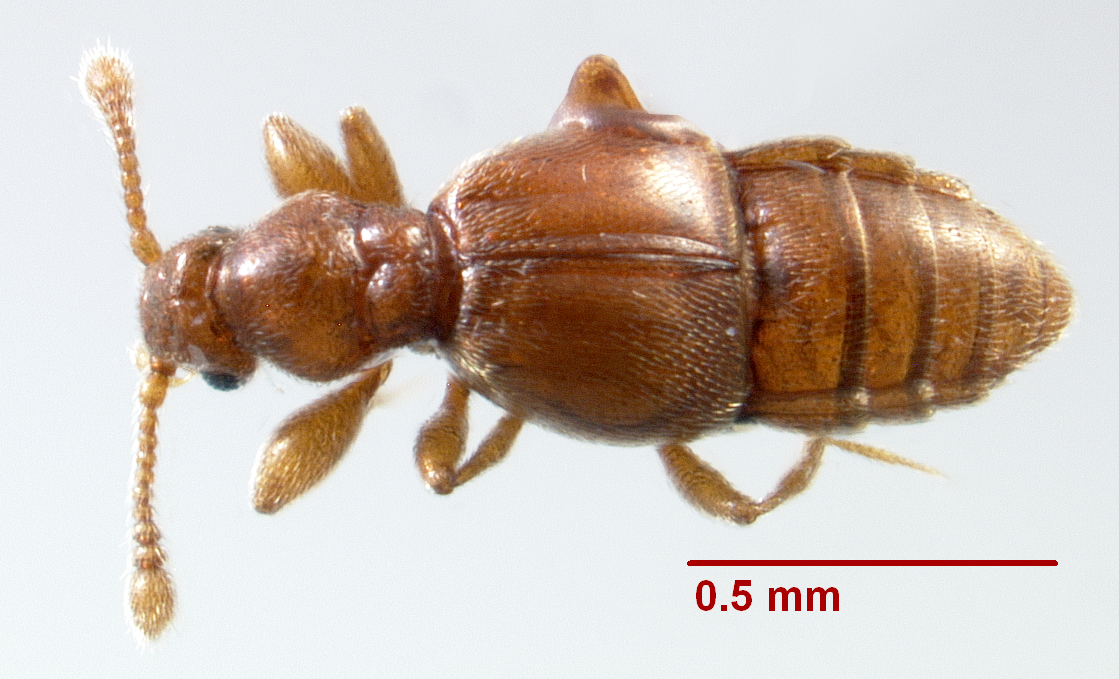
- Trimioplectus obsoletus

Scientific classification
- Kingdom: Animalia
- Phylum: Arthropoda
- Class: Insecta
- Order: Coleoptera
- Suborder: Polyphaga
- Infraorder: Staphyliniformia
- Family: Staphylinidae
- Tribe: Trichonychini
- Genus: Trimioplectus; Brendel, 1891

= Trimioplectus =

Genus of beetles

Trimioplectus is a genus of ant-loving beetles in the family Staphylinidae. There are at least three described species in Trimioplectus.

== Species ==
These three species belong to the genus Trimioplectus:

- Trimioplectus auerbachi Park, 1949
- Trimioplectus australis Chandler, 1990
- Trimioplectus obsoletus Brendel, 1891
