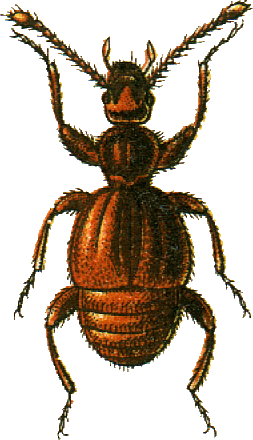
- Trichonyx sulcicollis

Scientific classification
- Kingdom: Animalia
- Phylum: Arthropoda
- Class: Insecta
- Order: Coleoptera
- Suborder: Polyphaga
- Infraorder: Staphyliniformia
- Family: Staphylinidae
- Tribe: Trichonychini
- Genus: Trichonyx; Chaudoir, 1845

= Trichonyx =

Genus of beetles

Trichonyx is a genus of ant-loving beetles in the family Staphylinidae. There are at least two described species in Trichonyx.

== Species ==
These two species belong to the genus Trichonyx:

- Trichonyx antennatus Raffray, 1877
- Trichonyx sulcicollis (Reichenbach, 1816)
