= Thesiastes =

Scientific classification
- Kingdom: Animalia
- Phylum: Arthropoda
- Class: Insecta
- Order: Coleoptera
- Suborder: Polyphaga
- Infraorder: Staphyliniformia
- Family: Staphylinidae
- Tribe: Euplectini
- Genus: Thesiastes; Casey, 1894

Genus of beetles

Thesiastes is a genus of ant-loving beetles in the family Staphylinidae. There are at least four described species in Thesiastes.

== Species ==
These four species belong to the genus Thesiastes:

- Thesiastes atratus Casey, 1894
- Thesiastes debilis (LeConte, 1878)
- Thesiastes fossulatus (Brendel, 1891)
- Thesiastes pumilis (LeConte, 1849)
