= Rhexidius =

Scientific classification
- Kingdom: Animalia
- Phylum: Arthropoda
- Class: Insecta
- Order: Coleoptera
- Suborder: Polyphaga
- Infraorder: Staphyliniformia
- Family: Staphylinidae
- Tribe: Trogastrini
- Genus: Rhexidius; Casey, 1887

Genus of beetles

Rhexidius is a genus of ant-loving beetles in the family Staphylinidae. There are about 10 described species in Rhexidius.

== Species ==
These 10 species belong to the genus Rhexidius:

- Rhexidius aggestus Schuster & Grigarick, 1962
- Rhexidius aperulus Casey
- Rhexidius asperulus Casey, 1894
- Rhexidius crenatus Schuster & Grigarick, 1962
- Rhexidius cuspidatus Schuster & Grigarick, 1962
- Rhexidius glareosus Schuster & Grigarick, 1962
- Rhexidius granulosus Casey, 1887
- Rhexidius hispidus Schuster & Grigarick, 1962
- Rhexidius impensus Schuster & Grigarick, 1962
- Rhexidius incomptus Schuster & Grigarick, 1962
