= Ramecia =

Scientific classification
- Kingdom: Animalia
- Phylum: Arthropoda
- Class: Insecta
- Order: Coleoptera
- Suborder: Polyphaga
- Infraorder: Staphyliniformia
- Family: Staphylinidae
- Tribe: Trichonychini
- Genus: Ramecia; Casey, 1894

Synonyms
- Liniolis Grigarick and Schuster, 1980

Genus of beetles

Ramecia is a genus of ant-loving beetles in the family Staphylinidae. There are at least three described species in Ramecia.

== Species ==
These three species belong to the genus Ramecia:

- Ramecia capitula (Casey, 1884)
- Ramecia crinita (Brendel, 1865)
- Ramecia discreta Casey
