= Conoplectus =

Scientific classification
- Kingdom: Animalia
- Phylum: Arthropoda
- Class: Insecta
- Order: Coleoptera
- Suborder: Polyphaga
- Infraorder: Staphyliniformia
- Family: Staphylinidae
- Tribe: Trogastrini
- Genus: Conoplectus; Brendel, 1888

Synonyms
- Hexirhexius Grigarick and Schuster, 1980; Prorhexius Raffray, 1890

Genus of beetles

Conoplectus is a genus of ant-loving beetles in the family Staphylinidae. There are about five described species in Conoplectus.

== Species ==
These five species belong to the genus Conoplectus:

- Conoplectus acornus Carlton, 1983
- Conoplectus bicentennialus Carlton, 1983
- Conoplectus canaliculatus (LeConte, 1849)
- Conoplectus excavoides Carlton, 1983
- Conoplectus susae Carlton, 1983
