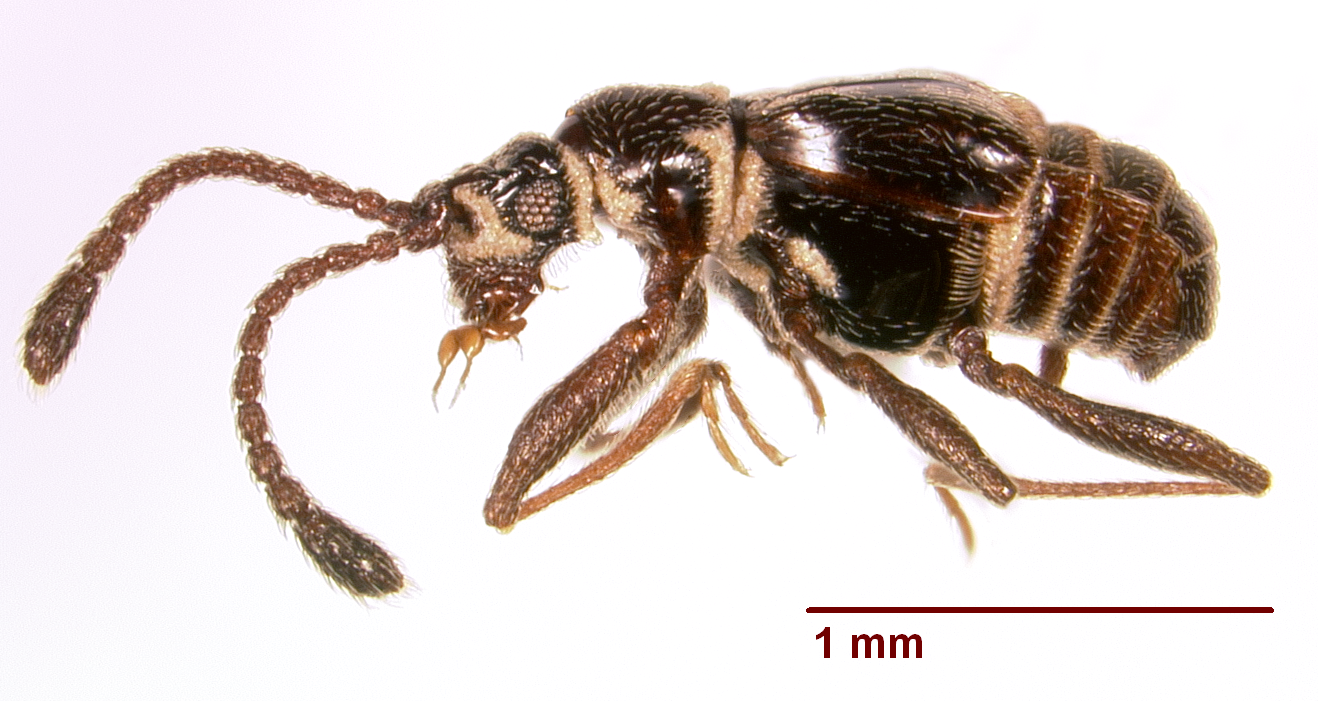
- Ctenisodes sp.

Scientific classification
- Kingdom: Animalia
- Phylum: Arthropoda
- Class: Insecta
- Order: Coleoptera
- Suborder: Polyphaga
- Infraorder: Staphyliniformia
- Family: Staphylinidae
- Subfamily: Pselaphinae; Latreille, 1802

= Pselaphinae =

Subfamily of beetles

Pselaphinae are a subfamily of beetles in the family Staphylinidae, the rove beetles. The group was originally regarded as a separate family named Pselaphidae. Newton and Thayer (1995) placed them in the Omaliine group of the family Staphylinidae based on shared morphological characters.

This is a species-rich subfamily with 9,000 to 10,000 described species. They are especially diverse in the tropics. They are commonly found in decaying leaf litter on forest floors, in grass tussocks, flood refuse, moss, and other highly structured and particulate microhabitats. Little is known about their biology. They are believed to be predatory on small invertebrates, in particular springtails (order Collembola) and oribatid mites (order Oribatida).

Pselaphines have attracted the interest of entomologists due to their exquisite and variable morphology, which is rewarding to observe with a microscope. In addition, the myrmecophilous ("ant-loving") behavior of some pselaphine groups (notably certain batrisites, pselaphites, and clavigerites) has inspired behavioral studies. Spectacular morphology and myrmecophilia are both taken to extremes by the Clavigeritae. These are obligate inquilines which have undergone radical changes in body form, including segmental fusions within the abdomen and antennae to form strong, rigid, plate- and club-like structures, respectively. Clavigerites also possess trichomes, which secrete a solution on which ant larvae feed.

== Anatomy ==
Pselaphines are small, compact beetles. The elytra are short, not covering the first abdominal segment. The head and pronotum are narrower than the elytra. Most have clubbed antennae.

Most species have 11 antennomeres, and some have 10, 9, or 3. Most have a tarsal segmentation formula of 3-3-3, and some have 2-2-2.

== Systematics ==
The 100 genera in North America contain 710 species.

The Pselaphinae consist of six "supertribes":

- Faronitae
- Euplectitae
- Goniaceritae
- Pselaphitae
- Clavigeritae
- Batrisitae

== Gallery ==
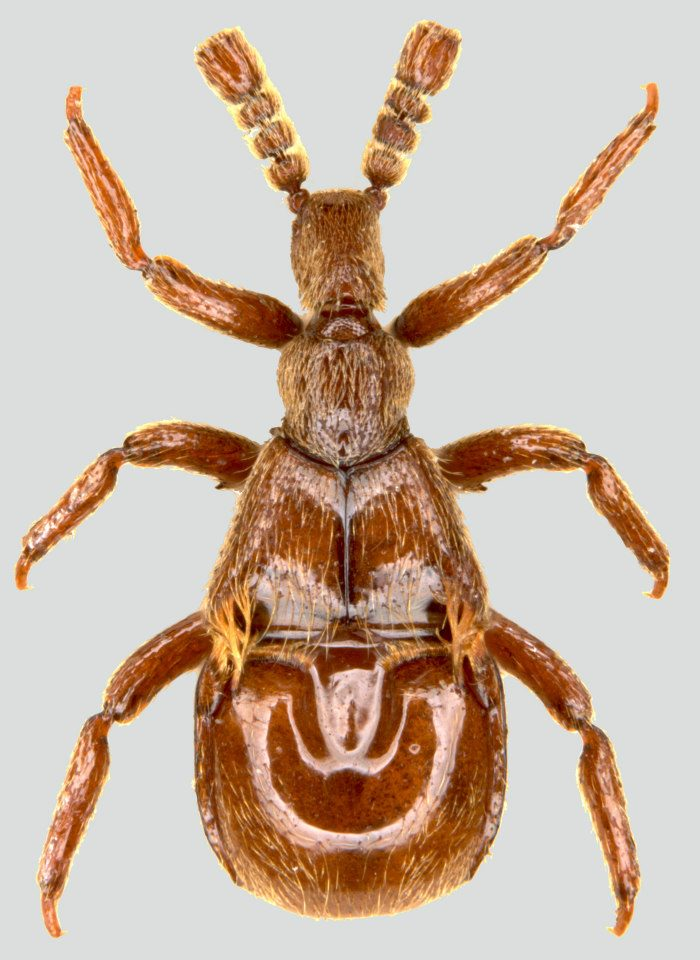
Claviger testaceus

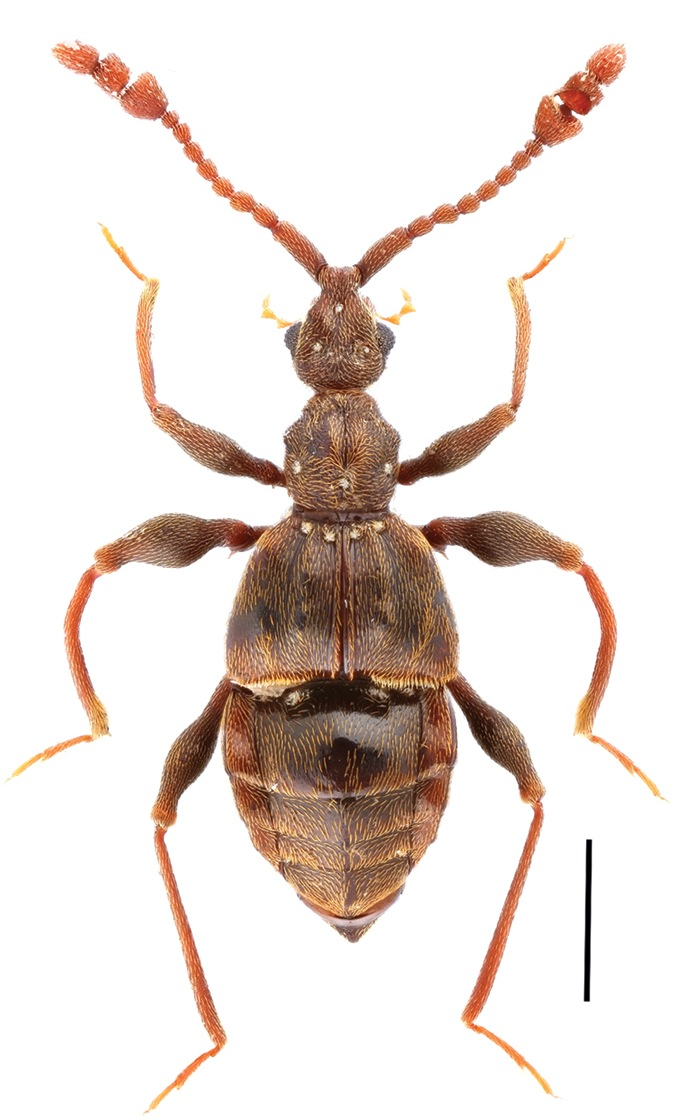
Labomimus mirus

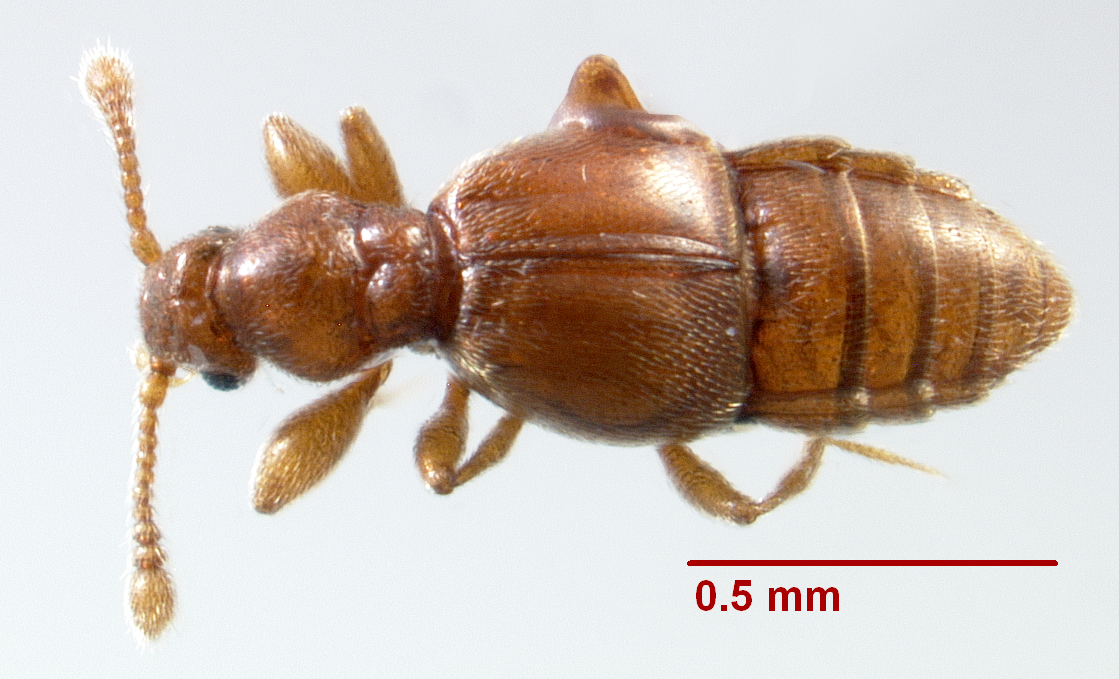
Trimioplectus obsoletus

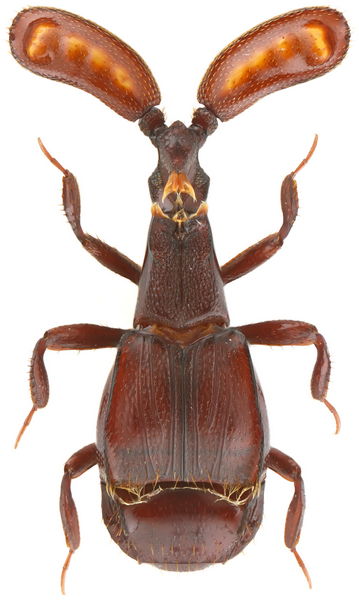
Colilodion schulzi

== See also ==
- List of Pselaphinae genera
