= Valda =

Valda may refer to:

== People ==
- Augusto Valda Vargas (born 1957), Bolivian politician and journalist
- Valda Aveling (1920–2007), Australian pianist, harpsichordist and clavichordist
- Valda Cooper, American journalist and reporter
- Valda Hansen (1932–1993), American actress
- Valda James (born 1928), British politician
- Valda Lake (born 1968), British tennis player
- Valda Osborn (1934–2022), British figure skater
- Valda Setterfield (1934–2023), British-American postmodern dancer and actress
- Valda Unthank (1909–1987), Australian cyclist who held numerous records for long-distance cycling, mostly set during
- Valda Valkyrien (1895–1956), Danish silent film actress

== Places ==
- Valda (Altavalle), Trentino, Italy

== Other ==
- 262 Valda, main belt asteroid
- Valda (beetle), genus of ant-loving beetles in the family Staphylinidae
- ŽIA valda, is Lithuanian investment company
