= Bryaxis kumgangsanensis =

Scientific classification
- Kingdom: Animalia
- Phylum: Arthropoda
- Clade: Pancrustacea
- Class: Insecta
- Order: Coleoptera
- Suborder: Polyphaga
- Infraorder: Staphyliniformia
- Family: Staphylinidae
- Supertribe: Goniaceritae
- Tribe: Bythinini
- Genus: Bryaxis
- Species: B. kumgangsanensis

Binomial name
- Bryaxis kumgangsanensis Löbl, 2000

Species of beetle

Bryaxis kumgangsanensis is a species of ant-loving beetle in the family Staphylinidae.

The genus was first described in 2000 by Ivan Löbl.

The species is endemic to North Korea, where it is found in Kangwon Province. The species epithet, kumgangsanensis, describes the beetle as coming from Kumgangsan, the type locality.
