= Bryaxis fabaiformis =

Scientific classification
- Kingdom: Animalia
- Phylum: Arthropoda
- Clade: Pancrustacea
- Class: Insecta
- Order: Coleoptera
- Suborder: Polyphaga
- Infraorder: Staphyliniformia
- Family: Staphylinidae
- Supertribe: Goniaceritae
- Tribe: Bythinini
- Genus: Bryaxis
- Species: B. fabaiformis

Binomial name
- Bryaxis fabaiformis Choi, Park, Lee & Park, 2023

Species of beetle

Bryaxis fabaiformis is a species of beetle in the family Staphylinidae.

This beetle was first described in 2023 by Yeon-Jae Choi, Sun-Jae Park, Seung-Gyu Lee, and Jong-Seok Park. The species epithet, fabaiformis, combines the Latin words faba (“bean”) and -formis (“having the form of”), and refers to the shape of antennal pedicels in the male.

It is found on the Korean peninsula in Gangwon-do.

The holotype and paratypes of this beetle were collected by sifting soil and leaf litter in a mixed forest.
