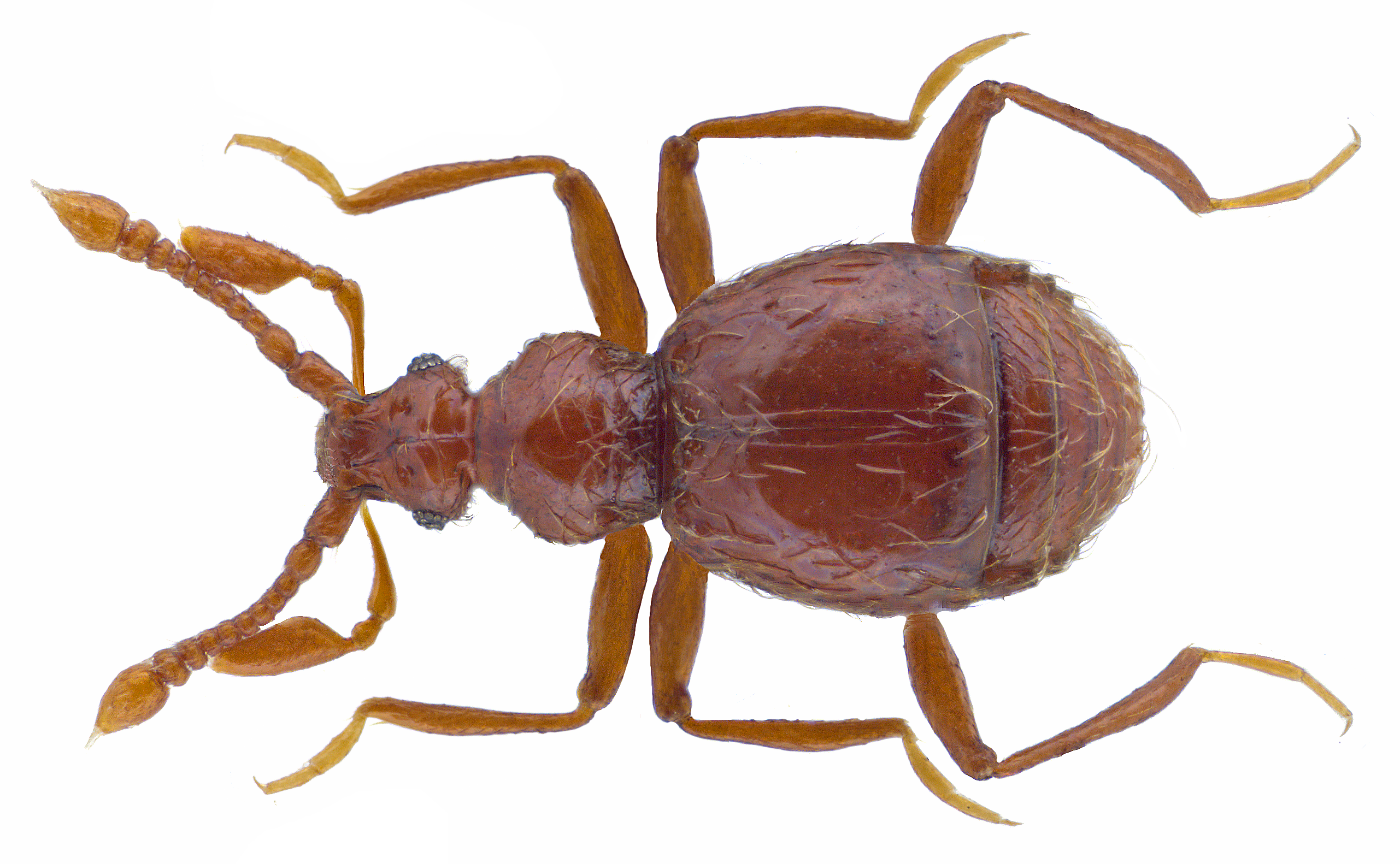
- Bryaxis convexus, Greece

Scientific classification
- Kingdom: Animalia
- Phylum: Arthropoda
- Class: Insecta
- Order: Coleoptera
- Suborder: Polyphaga
- Infraorder: Staphyliniformia
- Family: Staphylinidae
- Subfamily: Pselaphinae
- Supertribe: Goniaceritae
- Tribe: Bythinini
- Genus: Bryaxis; Kugelann, 1794

= Bryaxis (beetle) =

Genus of beetles

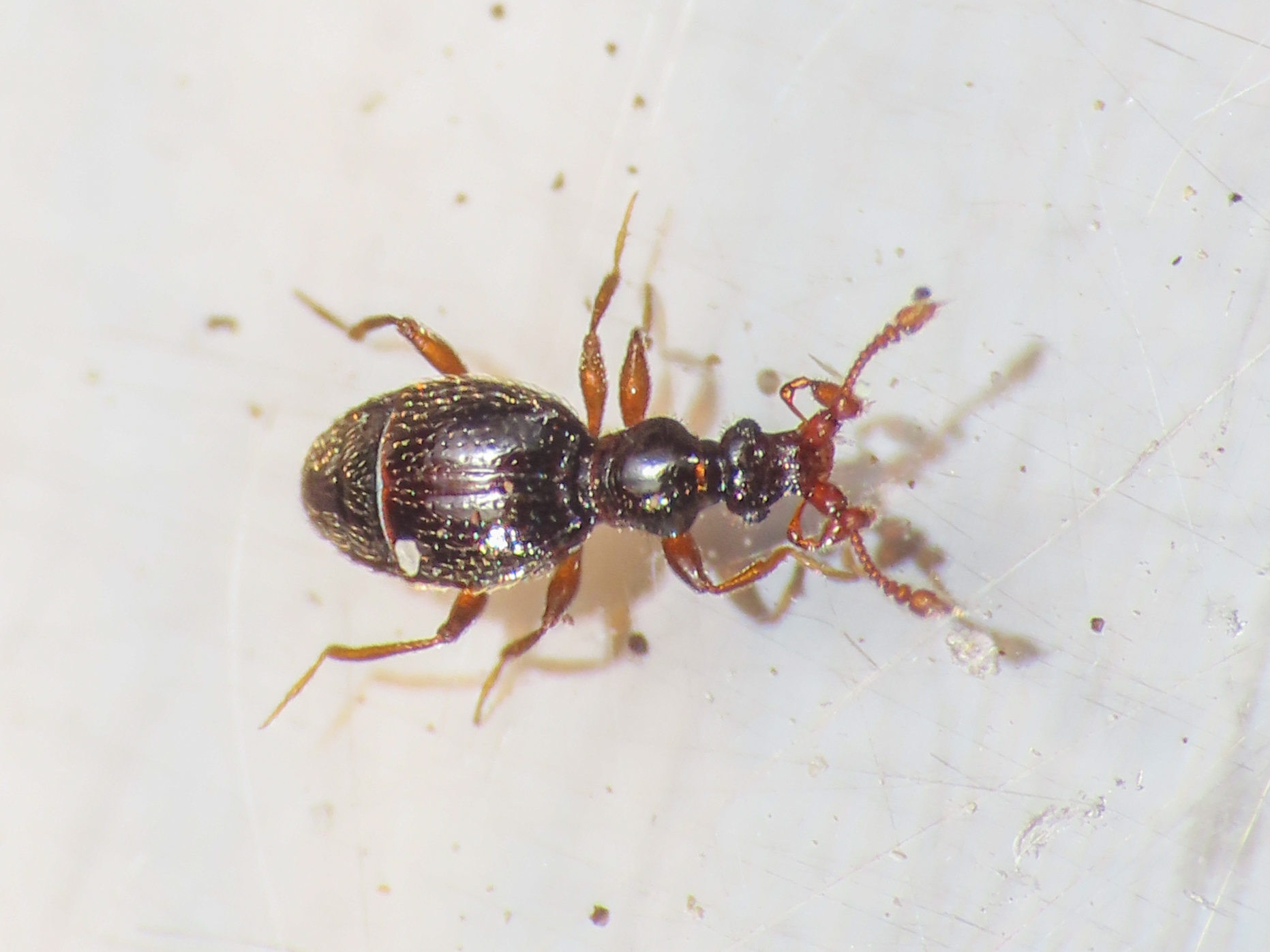
Bryaxis, Italy

Bryaxis is a genus of ant-loving beetles in the family Staphylinidae. There are more than 380 described species in Bryaxis.

The genus was first described in 1794 by Johann Gottlieb Kugelann.

== Bryaxis species ==
These 385 species are members of the genus Bryaxis, according to the Catalogue of Life.

- Bryaxis abastumanus (Reitter, 1881)
- Bryaxis abkhasicus Besuchet & Kurbatov, 2007
- Bryaxis acernus Castellini, 1978
- Bryaxis adjaricus Besuchet & Kurbatov, 2007
- Bryaxis adumbratus Besuchet & Kurbatov, 2007
- Bryaxis aelistae (Reitter, 1882)
- Bryaxis affinis (Sharp, 1883)
- Bryaxis alayai Löbl & Kurbatov, 1996
- Bryaxis albanicus (Apfelbeck, 1907)
- Bryaxis alesi Löbl & Kurbatov, 1996
- Bryaxis alishanus Löbl & Kurbatov, 1996
- Bryaxis alpestris (Dodero, 1900)
- Bryaxis altivagus Besuchet, 1962
- Bryaxis amasiae (Reitter, 1890)
- Bryaxis ami Löbl & Kurbatov, 1996
- Bryaxis ammon (Saulcy, 1878)
- Bryaxis amurensis Kurbatov, 1985
- Bryaxis anatolicus (Saulcy, 1878)
- Bryaxis andalusiacus (Jeannel, 1956)
- Bryaxis appendiculatus (Reitter, 1885)
- Bryaxis aragonensis (Franz, 1955)
- Bryaxis argiolus (Reitter, 1888)
- Bryaxis argodi (Croissandeau, 1885)
- Bryaxis argus (Kraatz, 1863)
- Bryaxis armeniacus Brachat, 2019
- Bryaxis armipes (Reitter, 1881)
- Bryaxis arnoldii Besuchet, 1961
- Bryaxis artvinensis Besuchet & Kurbatov, 2007
- Bryaxis asciicornis Kurbatov, 1985
- Bryaxis assingi Besuchet & Kurbatov, 2007
- Bryaxis asturiensis (Reitter, 1880)
- Bryaxis atilla (Saulcy, 1878)
- Bryaxis atlanticides Newton, 2015
- Bryaxis auritides Newton, 2015
- Bryaxis badius Besuchet, 1961
- Bryaxis bajulus (Hampe, C., 1863)
- Bryaxis balabanus Besuchet & Kurbatov, 2007
- Bryaxis balneator Besuchet & Kurbatov, 2007
- Bryaxis bedeki Bekchiev & Hlaváč, 2016
- Bryaxis bellax Löbl & Kurbatov, 1996
- Bryaxis bergamascus (Stolz, 1917)
- Bryaxis bericus Pace, 1974
- Bryaxis beroni Karaman, 1969
- Bryaxis abkhasicus Besuchet & Kurbatov, 2007
- Bryaxis biogradensis Kolibáč, Kodada, Šíma & Hlaváč, 2024
- Bryaxis blacensis (Karaman, 1954)
- Bryaxis bodemeyeri (Reitter, 1903)
- Bryaxis bojanensis (Apfelbeck, 1907)
- Bryaxis borckensis Besuchet & Kurbatov, 2007
- Bryaxis bosnicus (Ganglbauer, 1895)
- Bryaxis bothrophorus (Stolz, 1917)
- Bryaxis brachati Besuchet, 1980
- Bryaxis brescianus Daffner, 1986
- Bryaxis brusinae (Reitter, 1880)
- Bryaxis buddha Kurbatov & Löbl, 1995
- Bryaxis bulbifer (Reichenbach, 1816)
- Bryaxis bushido Löbl, Kurbatov & Nomura, 1998
- Bryaxis callipus (Apfelbeck, 1906)
- Bryaxis carinula (Rey, 1888)
- Bryaxis carpathicus (Saulcy, 1875)
- Bryaxis casalei Poggi, 1992
- Bryaxis castanoptera Motschulsky, 1851
- Bryaxis catalanus (Jeannel, 1950)
- Bryaxis cateniger (Krauss, 1899)
- Bryaxis cebennicus (Jeannel, 1950)
- Bryaxis cephalotes (Motschulsky, 1845)
- Bryaxis cepliki Hlaváč, 2009
- Bryaxis cetinjensis (Apfelbeck, 1906)
- Bryaxis chaudoirii (Chaudoir, 1845)
- Bryaxis chevrolati (Aubé, 1833)
- Bryaxis chiarae Monguzzi, 2016
- Bryaxis chilimontanus Nomura & Chang Eon Lee, 1993
- Bryaxis chobautianus Löbl, 1998
- Bryaxis claudioi Daffner, 1992
- Bryaxis clavicornis (Panzer, 1805)
- Bryaxis clavipes (Motschulsky, 1851)
- Bryaxis cocles (Saulcy, 1863)
- Bryaxis coelestis Löbl & Kurbatov, 1996
- Bryaxis coiffaiti Jeannel, 1958
- Bryaxis collaris (Baudi di Selve, 1859)
- Bryaxis colledanii Daffner, 1984
- Bryaxis comita (Rambousek, 1909)
- Bryaxis convexus (Kiesenwetter, 1858)
- Bryaxis corcyreus (Reitter, 1884)
- Bryaxis cornutus (Machulka, 1938)
- Bryaxis corsus Besuchet, 1999
- Bryaxis crassicornides Newton, 2017
- Bryaxis crassicornis (Motschulsky, 1835)
- Bryaxis credibilis Besuchet & Kurbatov, 2007
- Bryaxis crepsensis (Müller, G., 1947)
- Bryaxis crotchi (Sharp, 1874)
- Bryaxis curtisii (Leach, 1817)
- Bryaxis cythereias (Pic, 1903)
- Bryaxis dalmatinus (Reitter, 1881)
- Bryaxis dichrous (Reitter, 1882)
- Bryaxis difficilis (Reitter, 1884)
- Bryaxis disciger (Roubal, 1910)
- Bryaxis distinguendus Besuchet, 1961
- Bryaxis diversicornis (Raffray, 1873)
- Bryaxis dolosus Poggi & Sardu, 2013
- Bryaxis duboki Kolibáč, Kodada, Šíma & Hlaváč, 2024
- Bryaxis effeminatus Besuchet, 1983
- Bryaxis egens Besuchet & Kurbatov, 2007
- Bryaxis emeicus Kurbatov & Löbl, 1995
- Bryaxis emendatus Besuchet & Kurbatov, 2007
- Bryaxis emilianus (Stolz, 1926)
- Bryaxis erichsonii (Kiesenwetter, 1849)
- Bryaxis eurus Karaman, 1967
- Bryaxis euryscapus Besuchet & Kurbatov, 2007
- Bryaxis extremalis Kurbatov, 1990
- Bryaxis fagei (Jeannel, 1926)
- Bryaxis fauconneti (Fauvel, 1886)
- Bryaxis femoratus (Aubé, 1844)
- Bryaxis festivus Besuchet, 1964
- Bryaxis fictor Kurbatov & Löbl, 1998
- Bryaxis focarilei Besuchet, 1980
- Bryaxis fossicornis (Rambousek, 1916)
- Bryaxis frivaldszkyi (Reitter, 1887)
- Bryaxis fronticornis Bekchiev, 2013
- Bryaxis frustratus Besuchet, 1983
- Bryaxis gallicus (Reitter, 1887)
- Bryaxis ganglbaueri (Stolz, 1917)
- Bryaxis gemellus Besuchet & Kurbatov, 2007
- Bryaxis ghilarovi Besuchet, 1961
- Bryaxis giraffa (Reitter, 1880)
- Bryaxis goliath (Jeannel, 1922)
- Bryaxis gracilipalpis Jeannel, 1958
- Bryaxis grandicollis Jeannel, 1958
- Bryaxis grilati (Reitter, 1886)
- Bryaxis grouvellei (Reitter, 1882)
- Bryaxis hakka Löbl & Kurbatov, 1996
- Bryaxis halbherri (Reitter, 1885)
- Bryaxis hallamontanus Nomura & Chang Eon Lee, 1992
- Bryaxis harmandi Raffray, 1909
- Bryaxis heian Löbl, Kurbatov & Nomura, 1998
- Bryaxis heilongjiangensis Li, Jingke, 1993
- Bryaxis heliophobus (Apfelbeck, 1906)
- Bryaxis herculinus Besuchet, 1962
- Bryaxis heydeni (Reitter, 1880)
- Bryaxis hiranoi Taru & Nomura, 2021
- Bryaxis hisamatsui Löbl, Kurbatov & Nomura, 1998
- Bryaxis hokkiensis Löbl & Kurbatov, 1996
- Bryaxis hoko Löbl, Kurbatov & Nomura, 1998
- Bryaxis holciki Löbl, 1964
- Bryaxis humilis Raffray, 1909
- Bryaxis hypocritus Plavilstschikov, 1940
- Bryaxis ibericus (Saulcy, 1870)
- Bryaxis immodicus Besuchet & Kurbatov, 2007
- Bryaxis indistincta Motschulsky, 1851
- Bryaxis insularis (Holdhaus, 1905)
- Bryaxis ipsimus Besuchet & Kurbatov, 2007
- Bryaxis iriomotensis Löbl, Kurbatov & Nomura, 1998
- Bryaxis islamitus (Reitter, 1885)
- Bryaxis issensis (Müller, J., 1909)
- Bryaxis italicus (Baudi di Selve, 1870)
- Bryaxis japonicus (Sharp, 1874)
- Bryaxis joffrei (Sainte-Claire Deville, 1928)
- Bryaxis jomon Löbl, Kurbatov & Nomura, 1998
- Bryaxis jucundus Besuchet, 1961
- Bryaxis judaeus (Pic, 1900)
- Bryaxis judicariensis (Dodero, 1919)
- Bryaxis kahleni Pace, 1978
- Bryaxis kamakura Löbl, Kurbatov & Nomura, 1998
- Bryaxis karamanae Besuchet, 1958
- Bryaxis karaormani (Karaman, 1954)
- Bryaxis karate Löbl, Kurbatov & Nomura, 1998
- Bryaxis katana Löbl, Kurbatov & Nomura, 1998
- Bryaxis khnzoriani Besuchet, 1964
- Bryaxis kimi Kurbatov & Löbl, 1998
- Bryaxis kimjongkuki Nomura & Chang Eon Lee, 1993
- Bryaxis klimeschi (Blattný, W. & C. Blattný, 1914)
- Bryaxis kofun Löbl, Kurbatov & Nomura, 1998
- Bryaxis koltzei (Reitter, 1887)
- Bryaxis konecznii (Machulka, 1938)
- Bryaxis kovali Besuchet & Kurbatov, 2007
- Bryaxis krilei Hlaváč, 2008
- Bryaxis kruegeri (Machulka, 1932)
- Bryaxis kumensis Daffner, 1992
- Bryaxis kumgangsanensis Löbl, 2000
- Bryaxis kurnakovi Besuchet, 1960
- Bryaxis kuzmini Besuchet & Kurbatov, 2007
- Bryaxis laevipennis Besuchet & Kurbatov, 2007
- Bryaxis lagari (Halbherr, 1890)
- Bryaxis lanai Poggi, 2019
- Bryaxis lata Motschulsky, 1851
- Bryaxis lazistanicus Besuchet & Kurbatov, 2007
- Bryaxis lederi (Reitter, 1888)
- Bryaxis leechanyoungi Nomura & Chang Eon Lee, 1993
- Bryaxis leleupi (Jeannel, 1952)
- Bryaxis leonhardi (Reitter, 1902)
- Bryaxis lesbius Brachat, 2016
- Bryaxis lessinicus Pace, 1974
- Bryaxis libanicola (Sahlberg, J., 1908)
- Bryaxis liguricus (Dodero, 1919)
- Bryaxis litoralis Besuchet & Kurbatov, 2007
- Bryaxis lokayi (Machulka, 1927)
- Bryaxis longifrons Jeannel, 1952
- Bryaxis longifronsides Newton, 2015
- Bryaxis longipalpis (Motschulsky, 1835)
- Bryaxis longulus (Kiesenwetter, 1849)
- Bryaxis lurensis Besuchet, 2002
- Bryaxis lusitanicus (Saulcy, 1870)
- Bryaxis macedonicus (Karaman, 1953)
- Bryaxis macheonensis Nomura & Chang Eon Lee, 1993
- Bryaxis mahunkai Löbl, 1975
- Bryaxis mancinii (Dodero, 1919)
- Bryaxis mandarinus Löbl & Kurbatov, 1996
- Bryaxis marinae Sabella, 1989
- Bryaxis mayumi Löbl, Kurbatov & Nomura, 1998
- Bryaxis meghruicus Brachat, 2019
- Bryaxis meledanus Agazzi, 1964
- Bryaxis melinensis (Reitter, 1881)
- Bryaxis mendax Kurbatov & Löbl, 1998
- Bryaxis merkli Löbl, 2000
- Bryaxis meskischesianus Meggiolaro, 1966
- Bryaxis meybohmianus Brachat, 2019
- Bryaxis mirei (Jeannel, 1956)
- Bryaxis mirificus Besuchet, 1983
- Bryaxis moczarskii (Winkler, A., 1911)
- Bryaxis mohamedis (Reitter, 1903)
- Bryaxis monguzzii Besuchet, 1980
- Bryaxis monstrosetibialis (Stolz, 1923)
- Bryaxis monticola (Jeannel, 1950)
- Bryaxis montivagus (Reitter, 1885)
- Bryaxis mosorensis (Karaman, 1953)
- Bryaxis mulsanti Kiesenwetter, 1850
- Bryaxis multiplex Besuchet & Kurbatov, 2007
- Bryaxis muscorum (Kiesenwetter, 1849)
- Bryaxis myops Besuchet & Kurbatov, 2007
- Bryaxis naginata Löbl, Kurbatov & Nomura, 1998
- Bryaxis nakeralae (Reitter, 1885)
- Bryaxis nametkini Kurbatov & Löbl, 1998
- Bryaxis nebrodensis Besuchet, 1980
- Bryaxis nemilensis (Reitter, 1885)
- Bryaxis nigriceps (Leach, 1826)
- Bryaxis nigripennis (Aubé, 1844)
- Bryaxis nigritus Löbl, 1998
- Bryaxis nitidulus Besuchet, 1961
- Bryaxis nivarius Besuchet & Kurbatov, 2007
- Bryaxis nodicornis (Aubé, 1833)
- Bryaxis nogodanensis Nomura & Chang Eon Lee, 1993
- Bryaxis noricus (Schubert, F., 1958)
- Bryaxis normandi (Jeannel, 1950)
- Bryaxis obenbergeri (Machulka, 1938)
- Bryaxis obventicius Besuchet & Kurbatov, 2007
- Bryaxis odontogena (Dodero, 1919)
- Bryaxis oertzeni (Reitter, 1882)
- Bryaxis oraniensis (Pic, 1896)
- Bryaxis orcinus Besuchet & Kurbatov, 2007
- Bryaxis oreophilus (Meixner, 1912)
- Bryaxis orousseti Secq, B. & M. Secq, 1991
- Bryaxis osellai Besuchet & Kurbatov, 2007
- Bryaxis oseticus Besuchet & Kurbatov, 2007
- Bryaxis ossaeus Besuchet, 2008
- Bryaxis pachyscelis Besuchet & Kurbatov, 2007
- Bryaxis paganettii (Blattný, W. & C. Blattný, 1914)
- Bryaxis paiwan Löbl & Kurbatov, 1996
- Bryaxis pallidior (Pic, 1901)
- Bryaxis panda Kurbatov & Löbl, 1995
- Bryaxis pandellei (Saulcy, 1863)
- Bryaxis pangeonicus Brachat, 2019
- Bryaxis pastoralis (Peyerimhoff, 1901)
- Bryaxis pavani (Tamanini, 1940)
- Bryaxis pawlowskii Löbl, 1974
- Bryaxis peckorum Löbl, Kurbatov & Nomura, 1998
- Bryaxis pedator (Reitter, 1882)
- Bryaxis pedemontanus Besuchet, 1958
- Bryaxis pedestris (Motschulsky, 1845)
- Bryaxis peloponnesius (Reitter, 1884)
- Bryaxis peninsulanus Nomura & Chang Eon Lee, 1993
- Bryaxis peninsularis (Saulcy, 1870)
- Bryaxis pentagonoceras (Stolz, 1917)
- Bryaxis persicoi (Rasetti, F., 1939)
- Bryaxis pescaroloi Poggi, 1984
- Bryaxis petri Raffray, 1915
- Bryaxis pictetii (Tournier, 1859)
- Bryaxis pilifera Motschulsky, 1851
- Bryaxis pingtungensis Löbl & Kurbatov, 1996
- Bryaxis pinkeri (Stolz, 1917)
- Bryaxis planifer Löbl & Kurbatov, 1996
- Bryaxis platalea Löbl, Kurbatov & Nomura, 1998
- Bryaxis pletnevi Kurbatov & Löbl, 1998
- Bryaxis polemon Besuchet & Kurbatov, 2007
- Bryaxis ponticus Besuchet & Kurbatov, 2007
- Bryaxis porsenna Reitter, 1882
- Bryaxis portalegrensis (Schaufuss, L. W., 1882)
- Bryaxis procerus (Gredler, 1873)
- Bryaxis propinquus Besuchet & Kurbatov, 2007
- Bryaxis pulchrotibialis Besuchet & Kurbatov, 2007
- Bryaxis pumilus Bekchiev & Brachat, 2015
- Bryaxis puncticollis (Denny, 1825)
- Bryaxis pygmaeides Newton, 2015
- Bryaxis pyrenaeus (Saulcy, 1863)
- Bryaxis rambouseki (Matcha, 1916)
- Bryaxis raptor Löbl & Kurbatov, 1996
- Bryaxis redemptus (Dodero, 1919)
- Bryaxis reissi (Machulka, 1933)
- Bryaxis reitteri (Saulcy, 1875)
- Bryaxis reversus (Sharp, 1883)
- Bryaxis rhinophorus (Blattný, W. & C. Blattný, 1914)
- Bryaxis rifensis Besuchet, 1962
- Bryaxis rivularis Besuchet & Kurbatov, 2007
- Bryaxis rossii Castellini, 1986
- Bryaxis rosti (Reitter, 1894)
- Bryaxis rostratus (Motschulsky, 1845)
- Bryaxis roubalianus Löbl, 1961
- Bryaxis roumaniae Raffray, 1904
- Bryaxis rousi Besuchet & Kurbatov, 2007
- Bryaxis rugosicollis (Fiori, 1905)
- Bryaxis ruidus Kurbatov & Löbl, 1998
- Bryaxis ruthenus (Saulcy, 1877)
- Bryaxis sacer Kurbatov & Löbl, 1995
- Bryaxis sacrificus Kurbatov & Löbl, 1995
- Bryaxis samniticus (Blattný, W. & C. Blattný, 1914)
- Bryaxis samothracicus Brachat, 2019
- Bryaxis samurai Löbl, Kurbatov & Nomura, 1998
- Bryaxis sarplaninensis (Karaman, 1953)
- Bryaxis sauteri Raffray, 1909
- Bryaxis sawadai Löbl, Kurbatov & Nomura, 1998
- Bryaxis scapularis (Reitter, 1881)
- Bryaxis schuelkei Besuchet & Kurbatov, 2007
- Bryaxis schusteri Neuhäuser-Happe, 1999
- Bryaxis scrutandus Besuchet & Kurbatov, 2007
- Bryaxis sculpticornis (Guillebeau, 1891)
- Bryaxis sculptifrons (Reitter, 1880)
- Bryaxis seductus Besuchet & Kurbatov, 2007
- Bryaxis serripes (Fauvel, 1891)
- Bryaxis sichotensis Kurbatov, 1994
- Bryaxis sichuanus Kurbatov & Löbl, 1995
- Bryaxis siculus (Fiori, 1913)
- Bryaxis silvicolides Newton, 2015
- Bryaxis simoni (Reitter, 1880)
- Bryaxis smetanai Löbl, 1964
- Bryaxis solidus (Reitter, 1881)
- Bryaxis sparcepunctatus Jeannel, 1958
- Bryaxis splendidus (Croissandeau, 1891)
- Bryaxis steindachneri (Reitter, 1881)
- Bryaxis stolzi (Machulka, 1932)
- Bryaxis sturanyi (Apfelbeck, 1906)
- Bryaxis subdentatus (Dodero, 1919)
- Bryaxis subseriatus (Weise, J., 1877)
- Bryaxis subsolidus (Reitter, 1902)
- Bryaxis sumo Löbl, Kurbatov & Nomura, 1998
- Bryaxis swaneticus (Reitter, 1885)
- Bryaxis taiwanus Löbl & Kurbatov, 1996
- Bryaxis tanto Löbl, Kurbatov & Nomura, 1998
- Bryaxis taradakensis Löbl, Kurbatov & Nomura, 1998
- Bryaxis tarokanus Löbl & Kurbatov, 1996
- Bryaxis temporalis Besuchet & Kurbatov, 2007
- Bryaxis tendensis Besuchet, 2002
- Bryaxis tenuicornides Newton, 2015
- Bryaxis testatus Kurbatov, 1994
- Bryaxis tetralobus Löbl, Kurbatov & Nomura, 1998
- Bryaxis theanus (Reitter, 1894)
- Bryaxis tienmushanus Kurbatov & Löbl, 1995
- Bryaxis tingitanus Besuchet, 1962
- Bryaxis tithonus (Apfelbeck, 1906)
- Bryaxis transitorius Besuchet & Kurbatov, 2007
- Bryaxis transsilvanicus (Ganglbauer, 1897)
- Bryaxis trezzii Monguzzi, 2016
- Bryaxis trichosus Jeannel, 1958
- Bryaxis trigonoceras (Holdhaus, 1904)
- Bryaxis troglocerus (Saulcy, 1870)
- Bryaxis troglodytes (Fiori, 1900)
- Bryaxis troglophilus Agazzi, 1961
- Bryaxis tscherkessicus (Reitter, 1888)
- Bryaxis tuberculiceps Nonveiller, Pavićević & Besuchet, 2003
- Bryaxis tychobythinoides Löbl & Kurbatov, 1996
- Bryaxis ullrichii (Motschulsky, 1851)
- Bryaxis unicus Löbl & Kurbatov, 1996
- Bryaxis ursus (Reitter, 1882)
- Bryaxis ussuriensis Löbl, 1964
- Bryaxis valentulus Kurbatov & Löbl, 1998
- Bryaxis validicornides Newton, 2015
- Bryaxis verrucipalpis (Apfelbeck, 1907)
- Bryaxis vicinus (Dodero, 1919)
- Bryaxis viertli (Reitter, 1882)
- Bryaxis viti Besuchet & Kurbatov, 2007
- Bryaxis vlastae Roubal, 1913
- Bryaxis wankai (Reitter, 1915)
- Bryaxis weisei (Saulcy, 1875)
- Bryaxis witzgalli Daffner, 1982
- Bryaxis wolongensis Kurbatov & Löbl, 1995
- Bryaxis yari Löbl, Kurbatov & Nomura, 1998
- Bryaxis ypsilon Besuchet & Kurbatov, 2007
- Bryaxis yushanensis Löbl & Kurbatov, 1996
- Bryaxis zubroides Bekchiev, 2022

=== Further species, given by different sources ===
- Bryaxis fabaiformis Choi, Park, Lee & Park 2023
- Bryaxis grandinodus Choi, Park, Lee & Park 2023
- Bryaxis girinensis Choi, Park, Lee & Park, 2023
- Bryaxis nemorosus Choi, Park, Lee & Park, 2023
- Bryaxis uljinensis Choi, Park, Lee & Park, 2023
