= Reichenbachia arthritica =

Scientific classification
- Kingdom: Animalia
- Phylum: Arthropoda
- Class: Insecta
- Order: Coleoptera
- Suborder: Polyphaga
- Infraorder: Staphyliniformia
- Family: Staphylinidae
- Genus: Reichenbachia
- Species: R. arthritica

Binomial name
- Reichenbachia arthritica (Brendel, 1894)

Species of beetle

Reichenbachia arthritica is a species of ant-loving beetles in the family Staphylinidae. It is found in North America.
