= Gastrobothrus platynotus =

Scientific classification
- Kingdom: Animalia
- Phylum: Arthropoda
- Clade: Pancrustacea
- Class: Insecta
- Order: Coleoptera
- Suborder: Polyphaga
- Infraorder: Staphyliniformia
- Family: Staphylinidae
- Genus: Gastrobothrus
- Species: G. platynotus

Binomial name
- Gastrobothrus platynotus (Broun, 1893)

Synonyms
- Bryaxis platynota Broun, 1893; Gastrobothrus (Eupines) platynota

Species of beetle

Gastrobothrus platynotus is a species of beetle of the family Staphylinidae. It is found in New Zealand (North Island).

== Description ==
The head and pronotum are moderately dark brown, while the elytra, abdomen and legs are brighter and reddish-brown.
