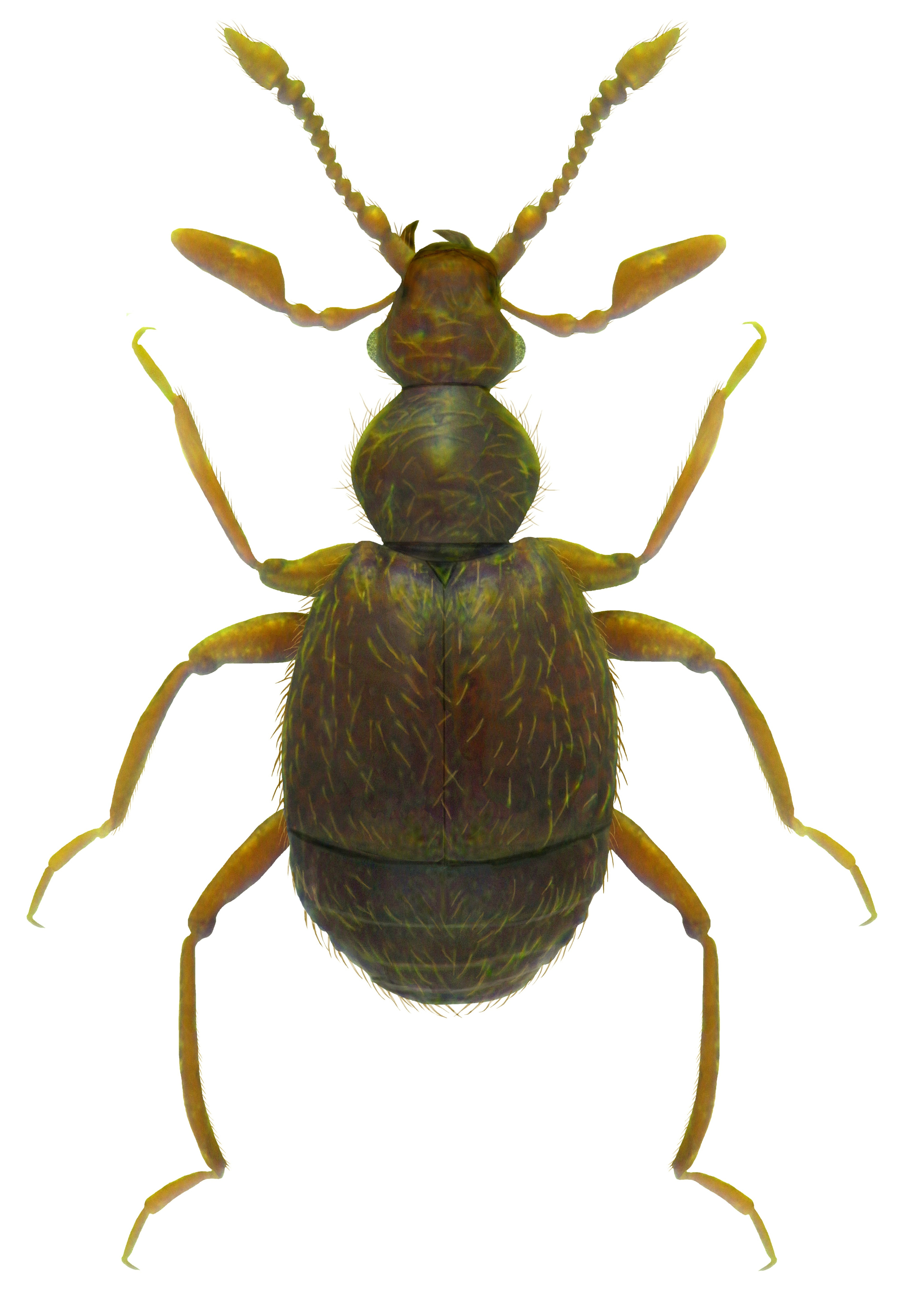
- Bryaxis curtisi

Scientific classification
- Kingdom: Animalia
- Phylum: Arthropoda
- Class: Insecta
- Order: Coleoptera
- Suborder: Polyphaga
- Infraorder: Staphyliniformia
- Family: Staphylinidae
- Subfamily: Pselaphinae
- Supertribe: Goniaceritae
- Tribe: Bythinini; Achille Raffray, 1890

= Bythinini =

Tribe of beetles

Bythinini is a tribe of small short-winged mould beetles from the supertribe Goniaceritae. It comprises over 600 species.

== Distribution ==
They are found primarily in the Holarctic region.

== Description ==
Bythinini are small rove beetles—most species have a body length of less than 5 mm. Members of this tribe are characterized by a short third maxillary palpus, with the second and fourth palpal segments elongated and the fourth swollen; they often have a frontally projecting rostrum and an elongated first antennal segment; an oculo-mandibular carina is present; the first visible sternite is approximately the same length as the second along the midline and is clearly visible; the hind claw on each tarsus is reduced. Their antennae are long and club-shaped, the elytra are shortened, and the tarsi are three-segmented. They are found in forest litter, soil, caves, mosses, and near streams or springs.

== Systematics ==
This is a large tribe of pselaphine beetles, including over 600 species and about 30 genera. The taxon was first established in 1890 by the French zoologist Achille Raffray.

Subtribe: Bythinina Raffray, 1890

· Bryaxis Kugelann, 1794 — (about 400 species)

· Bythinus Leach, 1817 — Europe (35 species)

· Glyphobythus Raffray, 1904 — (9 species)

· Linderia Saulcy, 1863 — (11 species)

· Machaerodes Brendel, 1890 — North America (1 species)

· Typhlobythus Jeannel, 1926 — France (1 species)

Subtribe: Machaeritina Jeannel, 1950 (this subtribe is primarily composed of cave-dwelling species, and its status is debated)

· Antrobythus Besuchet, 1985 — Europe (2 species)

· Bathybythus Besuchet, 1974 — Spain (1 species)

· Bythoxenites Jeannel, 1958 — Japan (10 species)

· Bythoxenus Motschulsky, 1860 — Europe (2 species)

· Decatocerus Saulcy, 1871 — Spain (6 species)

· Gasparobythus Poggi, 1992 — (2 species)

· Leptobythus Jeannel, 1955 — Mallorca (1 species)

· Machaerites Miller, 1855 — Balkans (14 species)

· Prionobythus Jeannel, 1921 — Spain (2 species)

· Spelaeobythus Löbl, 1965 — Europe (1 species)

· Speleochus Park, 1951 — North America (8 species)

Subtribe: Xenobythina Jeannel, 1950 (the status of this subtribe is debated)

· Pselaptrichus Brendel, 1889 — (39 species)

· Xenobythus Peyerimhoff, 1901 — French Alps (1 species)

Genera incertae sedis (the following genera are placed within Bythinini but their precise subtribal classification is uncertain (incertae sedis))

· Biokovobythus Pavićević & Ozimec, 2014 – Balkans(1 species)

· Gasparobythus Poggi, 1992 - Italy(2 species)

· Grguria Pavićević & Ozimec, 2012 — Balkans (1 species)

Melledobythus Hlaváč, Nakládal & Jalžić, 2014 – Balkans (1 species)

· Nonveilleria Pavicevic & Besuchet, 2003 — Balkans (2 species)

· Pauperobythus Nonveiller, Pavićević & Ozimec, 2002 — Balkans (1 species)

· Velebythus Pavićević & Ozimec, 2012 – Balkans (1 species)

Fossil record (two extinct genera from Cretaceous Burmese amber are known within this tribe)

· †Boreotethys

· †Ceratobythus
