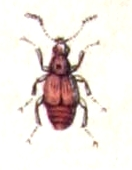
- Rybaxis longicornis

Scientific classification
- Kingdom: Animalia
- Phylum: Arthropoda
- Class: Insecta
- Order: Coleoptera
- Suborder: Polyphaga
- Infraorder: Staphyliniformia
- Family: Staphylinidae
- Supertribe: Goniaceritae
- Tribe: Brachyglutini
- Subtribe: Brachyglutina
- Genus: Rybaxis; Saulcy, 1876

= Rybaxis =

Genus of beetles

Rybaxis is a genus of ant-loving beetles in the family Staphylinidae. There are at least 20 described species in Rybaxis.

== Species ==
These 20 species belong to the genus Rybaxis:

- Rybaxis appressicornis Park, 1956
- Rybaxis arkansana Fall, 1927
- Rybaxis bifalxa Park, 1956
- Rybaxis brevis Oke, 1928
- Rybaxis clavata (Brendel, 1865)
- Rybaxis conjuncta (LeConte, 1849)
- Rybaxis geminata Fall, 1927
- Rybaxis gigas (Baudi di Selve, 1869)
- Rybaxis glabrella (Schaufuss, 1890)
- Rybaxis laminata (Motschulsky, 1836)
- Rybaxis longicornis (Leach, 1817)
- Rybaxis mystica Casey, 1894
- Rybaxis obliquedens Fall, 1927
- Rybaxis patris (Schaufuss, 1891)
- Rybaxis phantasma Park, 1958
- Rybaxis transversa Fall, 1927
- Rybaxis truncaticornis (Brendel, 1890)
- Rybaxis valida (Brendel, 1890)
- Rybaxis varicornis (Brendel, 1890)
- Rybaxis veterum (Schaufuss, 1890)
