= Brachygluta belfragei =

Scientific classification
- Kingdom: Animalia
- Phylum: Arthropoda
- Class: Insecta
- Order: Coleoptera
- Suborder: Polyphaga
- Infraorder: Staphyliniformia
- Family: Staphylinidae
- Genus: Brachygluta
- Species: B. belfragei

Binomial name
- Brachygluta belfragei LeConte, 1880

Species of beetle

Brachygluta belfragei is a species of ant-loving beetle in the family Staphylinidae. It is found in North America.
