= Gastrobothrus sharpi =

Scientific classification
- Kingdom: Animalia
- Phylum: Arthropoda
- Clade: Pancrustacea
- Class: Insecta
- Order: Coleoptera
- Suborder: Polyphaga
- Infraorder: Staphyliniformia
- Family: Staphylinidae
- Genus: Gastrobothrus
- Species: G. sharpi

Binomial name
- Gastrobothrus sharpi (Broun, 1880)

Synonyms
- Bryaxis sharpi Broun, 1880; Bryaxis abdominalis Broun, 1880

Species of beetle

Gastrobothrus sharpi is a species of beetle of the family Staphylinidae. It is found in New Zealand (North Island).

== Description ==
Adults reach a length of about 2.86–3.02 mm (0.113–0.119 in). The body is dark brown, with the maxillary palpi and elytra yellowish-brown.

== Life history ==
They have been collected in leaf litter from mixed forests, logs of kauri, from sedges in bush and fungus on Dysoxylum.
