= Decarthron abnorme =

Scientific classification
- Kingdom: Animalia
- Phylum: Arthropoda
- Class: Insecta
- Order: Coleoptera
- Suborder: Polyphaga
- Infraorder: Staphyliniformia
- Family: Staphylinidae
- Genus: Decarthron
- Species: D. abnorme

Binomial name
- Decarthron abnorme (LeConte, 1849)

Species of beetle

Decarthron abnorme is a species of ant eating beetle in the family Staphylinidae. It is found in North America.
