= Eupsenius =

Scientific classification
- Kingdom: Animalia
- Phylum: Arthropoda
- Class: Insecta
- Order: Coleoptera
- Suborder: Polyphaga
- Infraorder: Staphyliniformia
- Family: Staphylinidae
- Supertribe: Goniaceritae
- Tribe: Brachyglutini
- Subtribe: Eupseniina
- Genus: Eupsenius; LeConte, 1849

Genus of beetles

Eupsenius is a genus of ant-loving beetles in the family Staphylinidae. There are about six described species in this genus.

== Species ==
These six species belong to the genus Eupsenius:

- Eupsenius dilatatus Motschulsky, 1856
- Eupsenius glaber LeConte, 1849
- Eupsenius metasternalis Park
- Eupsenius nevermanni Park
- Eupsenius politus Reitter, 1883
- Eupsenius rectus Park
