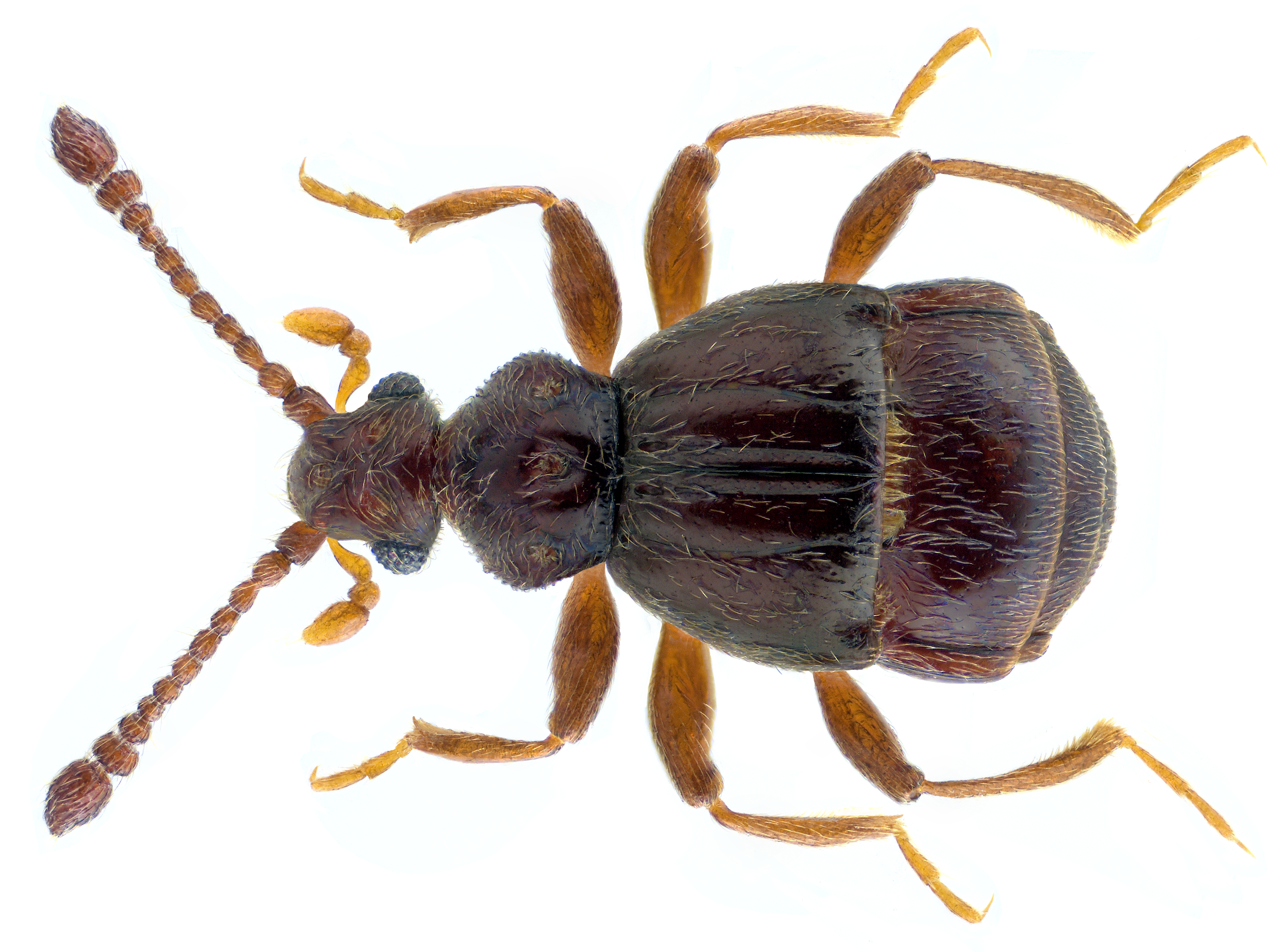

Scientific classification
- Domain: Eukaryota
- Kingdom: Animalia
- Phylum: Arthropoda
- Class: Insecta
- Order: Coleoptera
- Suborder: Polyphaga
- Infraorder: Staphyliniformia
- Family: Staphylinidae
- Supertribe: Goniaceritae
- Tribe: Brachyglutini
- Subtribe: Brachyglutina
- Genus: Brachygluta; Thomson, 1859

Synonyms
- Brachyglutodes Jeannel, 1956; Neobrachygluta Kaszab and Székessy, 1953; Nisa Casey, 1886

= Brachygluta =

Genus of beetles

Brachygluta is a genus of ant-loving beetles in the family Staphylinidae. They are specialist predators of mites. There are more than 80 described species in Brachygluta.

== Species ==
These 87 species belong to the genus Brachygluta:

- Brachygluta abdominalis (Aubé, 1833)
- Brachygluta abrupta Dodero, 1919
- Brachygluta angelinii Sabella, 1997
- Brachygluta appennina (Saulcy, 1876)
- Brachygluta arguta (Casey, 1897)
- Brachygluta arizonae (Casey, 1887)
- Brachygluta aubei (Tournier, 1868)
- Brachygluta balcanica (Saulcy, 1878)
- Brachygluta belfragei LeConte, 1880
- Brachygluta cavernosa (Saulcy, 1876)
- Brachygluta cavicornis (Brendel, 1865)
- Brachygluta celtiberica (Saulcy, 1876)
- Brachygluta chisos Sabella
- Brachygluta cochimi Buckle
- Brachygluta corniventris (Motschulsky, 1856)
- Brachygluta corsica (Saulcy, 1876)
- Brachygluta curvicera (Motschulsky, 1854)
- Brachygluta cypria (Baudi di Selve, 1869)
- Brachygluta dentata (Say, 1824)
- Brachygluta dentiventris (Saulcy, 1876)
- Brachygluta dichroa (Saulcy, 1876)
- Brachygluta diecki (Saulcy, 1876)
- Brachygluta eldredgei Chandler
- Brachygluta elegans (Brendel, 1890)
- Brachygluta exigua Besuchet, 1963
- Brachygluta floridana (Brendel, 1865)
- Brachygluta fossulata (Reichenbach, 1816)
- Brachygluta foveata (LeConte, 1851)
- Brachygluta foveola (Motschulsky, 1840)
- Brachygluta franciscae Besuchet, 1963
- Brachygluta furcata (Motschulsky, 1835)
- Brachygluta galathea (Saulcy, 1876)
- Brachygluta globulicollis (Mulsant & Rey, 1861)
- Brachygluta guillemardi (Saulcy, 1876)
- Brachygluta haematica (Reichenbach, 1816)
- Brachygluta helferi (Schmidt-Goebel, 1836)
- Brachygluta hipponensis (Saulcy, 1876)
- Brachygluta hispana Besuchet, 1963
- Brachygluta infinita (Casey, 1886)
- Brachygluta intermedia (Brendel, 1866)
- Brachygluta intricata (Casey, 1894)
- Brachygluta jacobina Casey, 1908
- Brachygluta judaica Besuchet
- Brachygluta kiowa Sabella
- Brachygluta klamath Buckle
- Brachygluta klimschi Holdhaus, 1902
- Brachygluta labyrinthea (Casey, 1894)
- Brachygluta lareaui Chandler
- Brachygluta lefebvrei (Aubé, 1833)
- Brachygluta loripes (Casey, 1894)
- Brachygluta luniger (LeConte, 1849)
- Brachygluta maxima (Reitter, 1884)
- Brachygluta mayo Sabella
- Brachygluta miccosukee Buckle
- Brachygluta moczarskii Holdhaus, 1908
- Brachygluta mormon Bowman, 1934
- Brachygluta narentina Reitter, 1890
- Brachygluta nodosa (Motschulsky, 1835)
- Brachygluta numidica (Saulcy, 1876)
- Brachygluta occidentalis Besuchet, 1963
- Brachygluta ochanensis Reitter, 1909
- Brachygluta paludosa (Peyron, 1858)
- Brachygluta perpunctata (Brendel, 1890)
- Brachygluta pirazzolii (Saulcy, 1876)
- Brachygluta pusilla Besuchet, 1958
- Brachygluta ragusae Saulcy, 1876
- Brachygluta retowskii (Simon, 1883)
- Brachygluta revelierei (Saulcy, 1876)
- Brachygluta sardoa (Saulcy, 1876)
- Brachygluta sengleti Besuchet, 1969
- Brachygluta seri Chandler
- Brachygluta shawnee Chandler
- Brachygluta sinuata (Aubé, 1833)
- Brachygluta spinicoxis (Motschulsky, 1835)
- Brachygluta tamaulipec Sabella
- Brachygluta terebrata (Casey, 1894)
- Brachygluta texana (Casey, 1886)
- Brachygluta tibialis (Aubé, 1844)
- Brachygluta transversalis (Schaum, 1859)
- Brachygluta trigonoprocta (Ganglbauer, 1895)
- Brachygluta tristis (C.Hampe, 1863)
- Brachygluta tuberculata (Baudi di Selve, 1869)
- Brachygluta uhagoni (Saulcy, 1876)
- Brachygluta ulkei (Brendel, 1866)
- Brachygluta vicaria Besuchet, 1963
- Brachygluta wickhami Buckle
- Brachygluta xanthoptera Reichenbach, 1816
