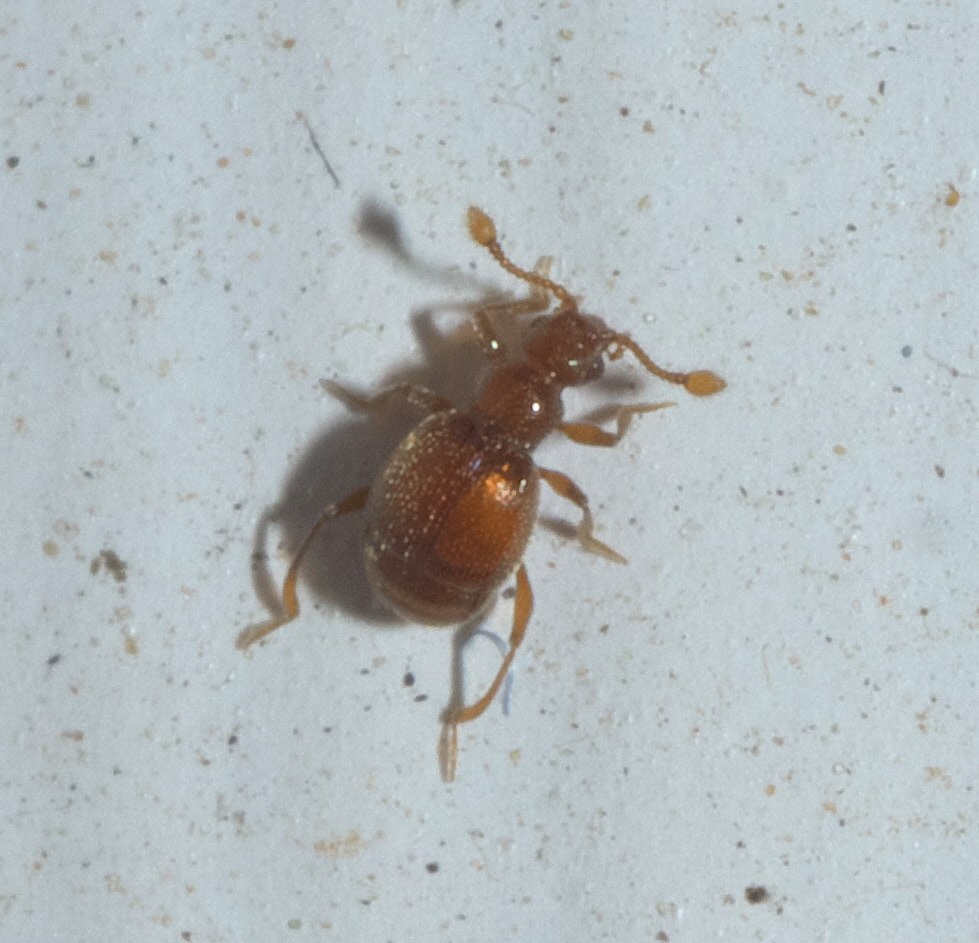

Scientific classification
- Kingdom: Animalia
- Phylum: Arthropoda
- Class: Insecta
- Order: Coleoptera
- Suborder: Polyphaga
- Infraorder: Staphyliniformia
- Family: Staphylinidae
- Genus: Eutrichites
- Species: E. zonatus

Binomial name
- Eutrichites zonatus (Brendel, 1865)

Synonyms
- Eutrichites zimmermanni LeConte, 1880

= Eutrichites zonatus =

Species of beetle

Eutrichites zonatus is a species of ant-loving beetle in the family Staphylinidae. It is found in North America.

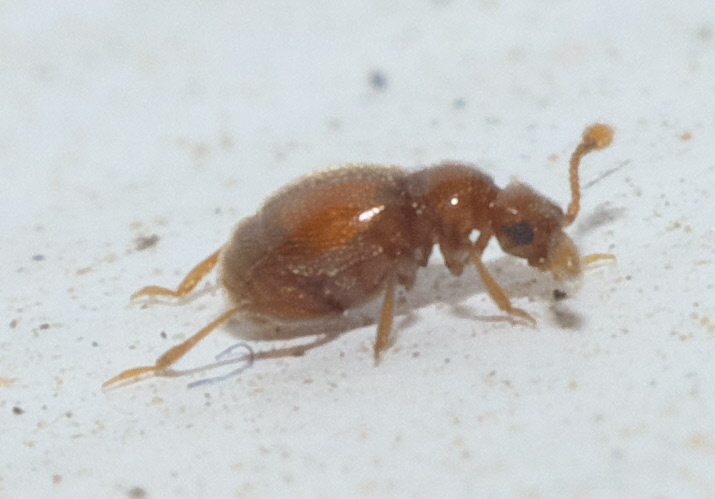
