= Gastrobothrus ignotus =

Scientific classification
- Kingdom: Animalia
- Phylum: Arthropoda
- Clade: Pancrustacea
- Class: Insecta
- Order: Coleoptera
- Suborder: Polyphaga
- Infraorder: Staphyliniformia
- Family: Staphylinidae
- Genus: Gastrobothrus
- Species: G. ignotus

Binomial name
- Gastrobothrus ignotus (Broun, 1881)

Synonyms
- Bryaxis ignotus Broun, 1881; Eupines ignotus

Species of beetle

Gastrobothrus ignotus is a species of beetle of the family Staphylinidae. It is found in New Zealand (North Island).

== Description ==
The body is dark and reddish-brown, with the tarsus brighter.
