= Nonveilleria =

Scientific classification
- Kingdom: Animalia
- Phylum: Arthropoda
- Clade: Pancrustacea
- Class: Insecta
- Order: Coleoptera
- Suborder: Polyphaga
- Infraorder: Staphyliniformia
- Family: Staphylinidae
- Tribe: Bythinini
- Genus: Nonveilleria; Pavićević & Besuchet, 2003

Genus of rove beetles

Nonveilleria is a genus of beetles in the family Staphylinidae.

== Systematics ==
The genus Nonveilleria currently includes two species:

Nonveilleria lepida Pavićević & Besuchet, 2003 (Montenegro)

Nonveilleria romani Pavićević & Besuchet, 2003 (Croatia)

== Distribution ==
Nonveilleria is present in Montenegro (Nonveilleria lepida) and Croatia (Nonveilleria romani).
