= Nipponobythus dolharubang =

Scientific classification
- Kingdom: Animalia
- Phylum: Arthropoda
- Clade: Pancrustacea
- Class: Insecta
- Order: Coleoptera
- Suborder: Polyphaga
- Infraorder: Staphyliniformia
- Family: Staphylinidae
- Genus: Nipponobythus
- Species: N. dolharubang

Binomial name
- Nipponobythus dolharubang (Nomura & Chang Eon Lee, 1992)

Synonyms
- Machulkaia dolharubang Nomura & Chang Eon Lee, 1992

Species of beetle

Nipponobythus dolharubang is a species of ant-loving beetle in the family Staphylinidae.

This species of beetle was first described in 1992 as Machulkaia dolharubang by Shūhei Nomura & Chang Eon Lee.

The species is endemic to Korea, where it has been found on Jeju-do.
