= Gastrobothrus angustus =

Scientific classification
- Kingdom: Animalia
- Phylum: Arthropoda
- Clade: Pancrustacea
- Class: Insecta
- Order: Coleoptera
- Suborder: Polyphaga
- Infraorder: Staphyliniformia
- Family: Staphylinidae
- Genus: Gastrobothrus
- Species: G. angustus

Binomial name
- Gastrobothrus angustus Choi, Leschen & Park, 2026

Species of beetle

Gastrobothrus angustus is a species of beetle of the family Staphylinidae. It is found in New Zealand (North Island).

== Description ==
Adults reach a length of about 2.31 mm (0.091 in). The body is brown, while the elytra are yellowish-brown.

== Life history ==
They have been collected in leaf litter and rotten wood in mixed deciduous forests with kauri.

== Etymology ==
The species name is derived from Latin angustus (meaning narrow) and refers to the relatively narrower pronotum than that of other species.
