= Decarthron velutinum =

Scientific classification
- Kingdom: Animalia
- Phylum: Arthropoda
- Class: Insecta
- Order: Coleoptera
- Suborder: Polyphaga
- Infraorder: Staphyliniformia
- Family: Staphylinidae
- Genus: Decarthron
- Species: D. velutinum

Binomial name
- Decarthron velutinum (LeConte, 1849)

Species of beetle

Decarthron velutinum is a species of ant-loving beetle in the family Staphylinidae. It is found in North America.
