= Nipponobythus =

Scientific classification
- Domain: Eukaryota
- Kingdom: Animalia
- Phylum: Arthropoda
- Class: Insecta
- Order: Coleoptera
- Suborder: Polyphaga
- Infraorder: Staphyliniformia
- Family: Staphylinidae
- Supertribe: Goniaceritae
- Genus: Nipponobythus; Jeannel, 1958

Genus of beetles

Nipponobythus is a genus of ant-loving beetles in the family Staphylinidae.

This genus was first described in 1958 by René Jeannel.

== Species ==
Species listed as accepted by GBIF:

- Nipponobythus caviceps Löbl, 1965
- Nipponobythus longicornis Löbl, 1965
- Nipponobythus dispar Löbl, 1965
- Nipponobythus korbeli Löbl, 1965
- Nipponobythus grandis Löbl, 1965
- Nipponobythus besucheti Löbl, 1965
- Nipponobythus mirabilis (Löbl, 1964)
- Nipponobythus latifrons Jeannel, 1958
- Nipponobythus plagiatus Jeannel, 1958
- Nipponobythus syrbatoides Jeannel, 1958
- Nipponobythus dolharubang (Nomura & Chang Eon Lee, 1992)
- Nipponobythus chilisanus Nomura & Chang Eon Lee, 1996
- Nipponobythus expectatus Löbl, 1965
- Nipponobythus omissus Löbl, 1965
- Nipponobythus alienoceps Yin & Zi-Wei, 2020
