= Nearctitychus =

Scientific classification
- Kingdom: Animalia
- Phylum: Arthropoda
- Class: Insecta
- Order: Coleoptera
- Suborder: Polyphaga
- Infraorder: Staphyliniformia
- Family: Staphylinidae
- Supertribe: Goniaceritae
- Tribe: Tychini
- Genus: Nearctitychus; Chandler, 1988

Genus of beetles

Nearctitychus is a genus of ant-loving beetles in the family Staphylinidae. There is one described species in Nearctitychus, N. sternalis.
