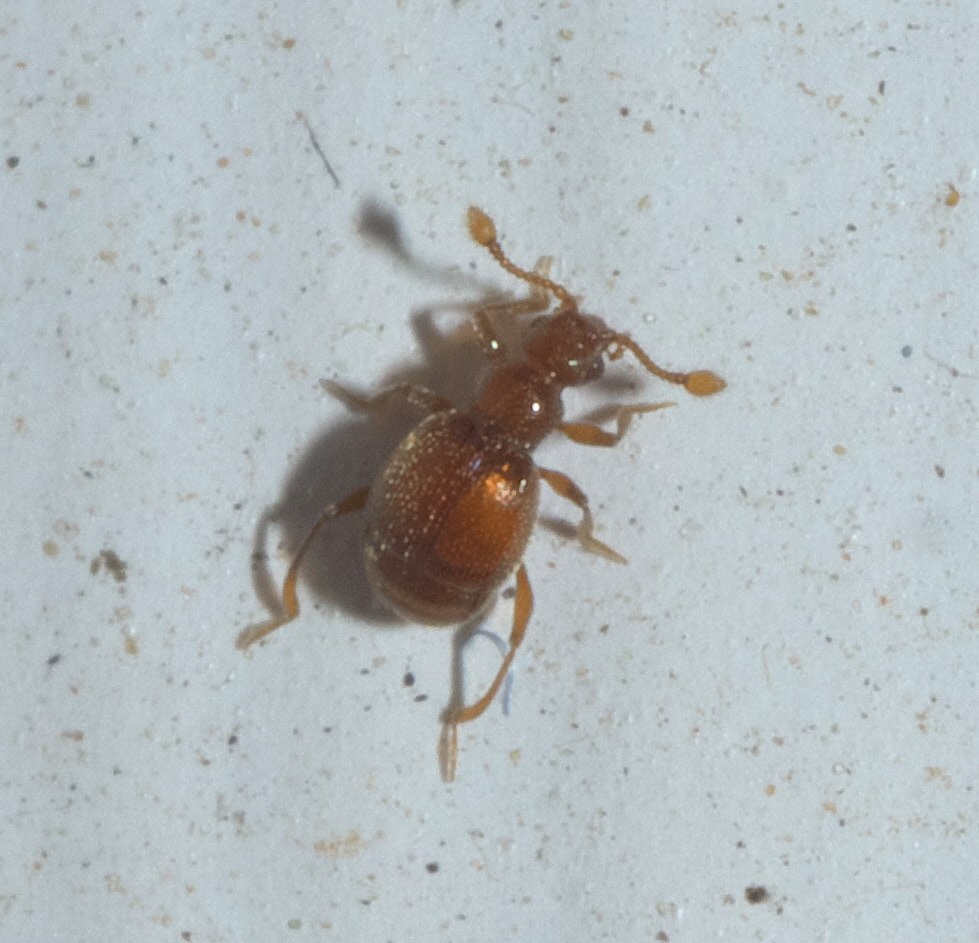
- Eutrichites zonatus

Scientific classification
- Kingdom: Animalia
- Phylum: Arthropoda
- Class: Insecta
- Order: Coleoptera
- Suborder: Polyphaga
- Infraorder: Staphyliniformia
- Family: Staphylinidae
- Supertribe: Goniaceritae
- Tribe: Brachyglutini
- Genus: Eutrichites; LeConte, 1880

= Eutrichites =

Genus of beetles

Eutrichites is a genus of ant-loving beetles in the family Staphylinidae. There are at least two described species in Eutrichites.

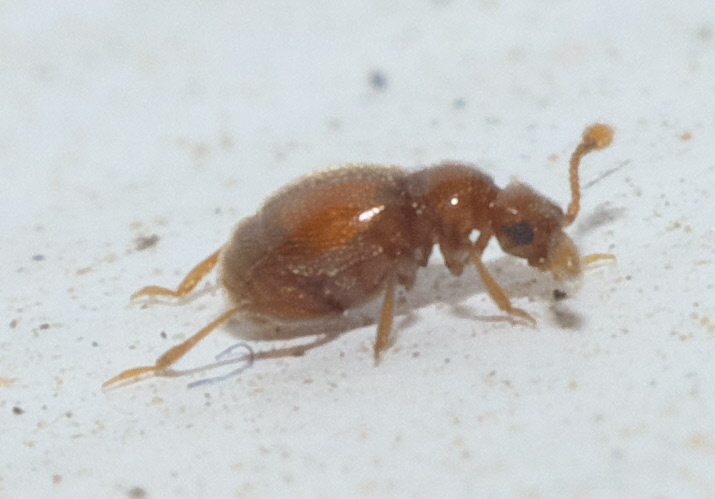
Eutrichites zonatus

== Species ==
These two species belong to the genus Eutrichites:

- Eutrichites arizonensis Carlton, 1989
- Eutrichites zonatus (Brendel, 1865)
