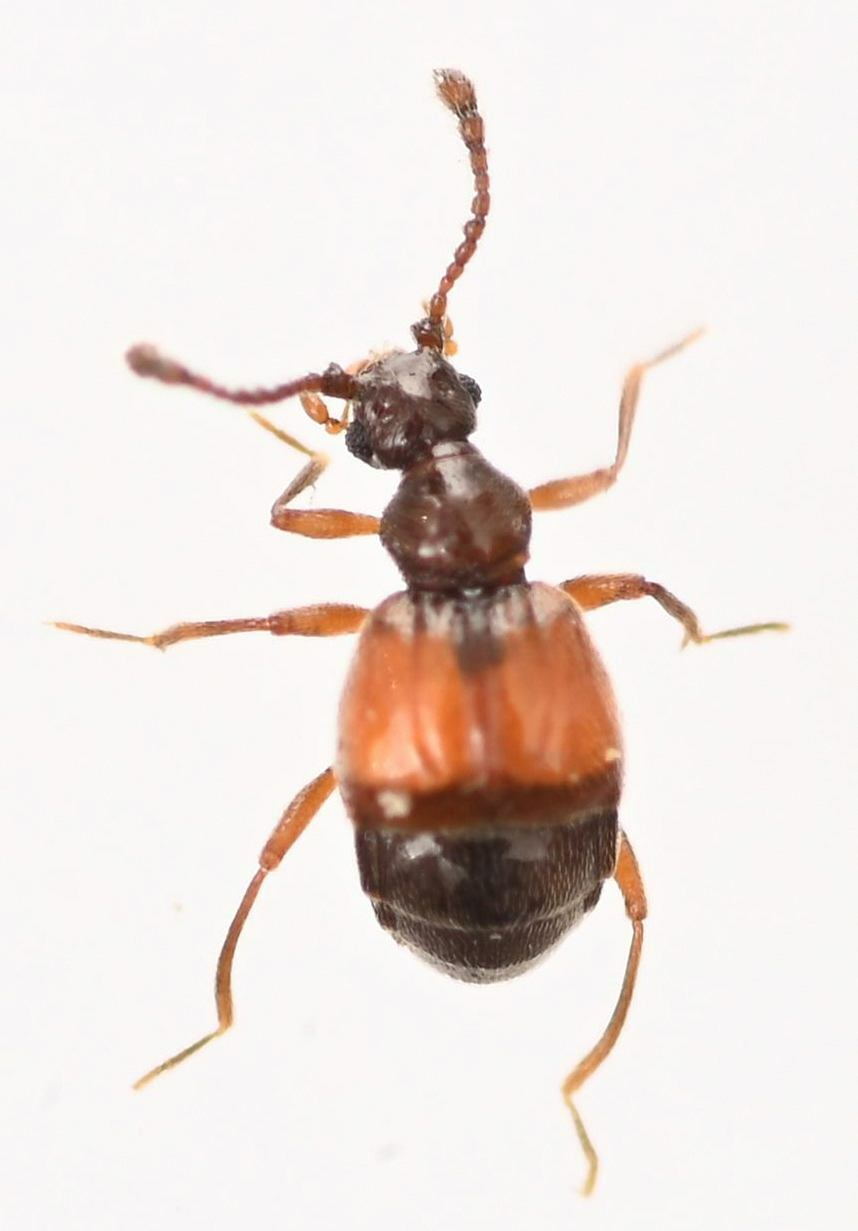
- Reichenbachia dorothyae

Scientific classification
- Kingdom: Animalia
- Phylum: Arthropoda
- Class: Insecta
- Order: Coleoptera
- Suborder: Polyphaga
- Infraorder: Staphyliniformia
- Family: Staphylinidae
- Supertribe: Goniaceritae
- Genus: Reichenbachia; Leach, 1826

Synonyms
- Dierobia Thomson, 1859

= Reichenbachia (beetle) =

Genus of beetles

Reichenbachia is a genus of ant-loving beetles in the family Staphylinidae. There are at least 70 described species in Reichenbachia.

== Species ==
- Reichenbachia albionica (Motschulsky, 1845)
- Reichenbachia appendiculata Raffray, 1904
- Reichenbachia arcifer Casey, 1897
- Reichenbachia arthritica (Brendel, 1894)
- Reichenbachia atlantica (Brendel, 1866)
- Reichenbachia bicolor (Brendel, in Brendel and Wickham, 1890)
- Reichenbachia binodifer Casey, 1897
- Reichenbachia borealis Casey, 1897
- Reichenbachia caseyi Raffray, 1904
- Reichenbachia chandleri Carlton, 2003
- Reichenbachia chiricahuensis Raffray, 1904
- Reichenbachia clamer Grigarick and Schuster, 1967
- Reichenbachia complectens (LeConte, 1880)
- Reichenbachia congener (Brendel, 1865)
- Reichenbachia corporalis Casey, 1897
- Reichenbachia cylindrarta (Brendel, 1893)
- Reichenbachia deformata (LeConte, 1880)
- Reichenbachia demissa Casey, 1894
- Reichenbachia depressifrons (Brendel, 1893)
- Reichenbachia divergens (LeConte, 1880)
- Reichenbachia dorothyae Park and Wagner, 1962
- Reichenbachia ectofacilis Park, 1956
- Reichenbachia emoyteis Grigarick and Schuster, 1967
- Reichenbachia facilis (Casey, 1884)
- Reichenbachia falli Casey, 1897
- Reichenbachia frosti Carlton, 2003
- Reichenbachia fusticornis Casey, 1897
- Reichenbachia gentilis Fletcher, 1932
- Reichenbachia gracilicornis Casey, 1886
- Reichenbachia gracilis (Casey, 1884)
- Reichenbachia hardyi Park, 1956
- Reichenbachia howardi Park, 1958
- Reichenbachia ignobilis Fletcher, 1932
- Reichenbachia inepta Casey, 1894
- Reichenbachia informis Casey, 1886
- Reichenbachia inopia (Casey, 1884)
- Reichenbachia insolita Casey, 1897
- Reichenbachia kansana Casey, 1897
- Reichenbachia kapones Grigarick and Schuster, 1967
- Reichenbachia loebli Carlton, 2003
- Reichenbachia louisiana Carlton, 2003
- Reichenbachia macho Carlton, 2003
- Reichenbachia nevadensis Casey, 1886
- Reichenbachia nodesa Grigarick and Schuster, 1967
- Reichenbachia ochopee Carlton, 2003
- Reichenbachia osceola Carlton, 2003
- Reichenbachia peregrinator Casey, 1897
- Reichenbachia polita (Brendel, 1890)
- Reichenbachia propinqua (LeConte, 1849)
- Reichenbachia pseudokansana Carlton, 2003
- Reichenbachia puncticollis (LeConte, 1849)
- Reichenbachia radians (LeConte, 1880)
- Reichenbachia rubricunda (Aubé, 1844)
- Reichenbachia sagax (LeConte, 1880)
- Reichenbachia sandersoni Carlton, 2003
- Reichenbachia scabra (Brendel, 1865)
- Reichenbachia semirugosa Brendel, 1895
- Reichenbachia skelleyi Carlton, 2003
- Reichenbachia snowi Fletcher, 1932
- Reichenbachia sodalis Casey, 1897
- Reichenbachia spatulifer Casey, 1897
- Reichenbachia subtilis (LeConte, 1851)
- Reichenbachia suteri Carlton, 2003
- Reichenbachia taphrocera Casey, 1897
- Reichenbachia tumida (LeConte, 1880)
- Reichenbachia tumidicornis Casey, 1886
- Reichenbachia tumorosa Casey, 1886
- Reichenbachia turgidicornis Casey, 1897
- Reichenbachia visda Grigarick and Schuster, 1967
- Reichenbachia wickhami (Brendel, 1893)
