= Gastrobothrus quadrus =

Scientific classification
- Kingdom: Animalia
- Phylum: Arthropoda
- Clade: Pancrustacea
- Class: Insecta
- Order: Coleoptera
- Suborder: Polyphaga
- Infraorder: Staphyliniformia
- Family: Staphylinidae
- Genus: Gastrobothrus
- Species: G. quadrus

Binomial name
- Gastrobothrus quadrus Choi, Leschen & Park, 2026

Species of beetle

Gastrobothrus quadrus is a species of beetle of the family Staphylinidae. It is found in New Zealand (North Island).

== Description ==
Adults reach a length of about 2.46 mm (0.097 in). The body is reddish-brown, with the head and pronotum darker.

== Life history ==
They have been collected in leaf litter in forest remnants, as well as on a bracket fungus in nikau.

== Etymology ==
The species name is derived from Latin quadrus (meaning square) and refers to the angulate head of this species.
