= Gastrobothrus sulcipennis =

Scientific classification
- Kingdom: Animalia
- Phylum: Arthropoda
- Clade: Pancrustacea
- Class: Insecta
- Order: Coleoptera
- Suborder: Polyphaga
- Infraorder: Staphyliniformia
- Family: Staphylinidae
- Genus: Gastrobothrus
- Species: G. sulcipennis

Binomial name
- Gastrobothrus sulcipennis (Broun, 1921)

Synonyms
- Eupinogitus sulcipennis Broun, 1921; Eupinogitus picescens Broun, 1921

Species of beetle

Gastrobothrus sulcipennis is a species of beetle of the family Staphylinidae. It is found in New Zealand (South Island).

== Description ==
Adults reach a length of about 1.94 mm (0.076 in). The body is light reddish-brown, with the appendages yellowish-brown.

== Life history ==
They have been collected in broad leaf litter and litter among sedges.
