= Decarthron =

Scientific classification
- Kingdom: Animalia
- Phylum: Arthropoda
- Class: Insecta
- Order: Coleoptera
- Suborder: Polyphaga
- Infraorder: Staphyliniformia
- Family: Staphylinidae
- Supertribe: Goniaceritae
- Tribe: Brachyglutini
- Genus: Decarthron; Brendel, 1865

Genus of beetles

Decarthron is a genus of ant-loving beetles in the family Staphylinidae. There are more than 20 described species in Decarthron.

== Species ==
These 25 species belong to the genus Decarthron:

- Decarthron abnorme (LeConte, 1849)
- Decarthron anneae Park, 1958
- Decarthron brendeli Casey, 1887
- Decarthron brundeli Casey
- Decarthron defectum Park, 1958
- Decarthron discolor Brendel, 1890
- Decarthron exiguum Notman, 1920
- Decarthron exsectum Brendel, 1865
- Decarthron formiceti (LeConte, 1849)
- Decarthron howdeni Park, 1956
- Decarthron inusitatum Park, 1958
- Decarthron justum Park, 1958
- Decarthron laurenticum Casey, 1897
- Decarthron longulum (LeConte, 1849)
- Decarthron marinum Brendel, 1893
- Decarthron mimicum Park, 1958
- Decarthron nigrocavum Park, 1958
- Decarthron reciprocum Park, 1958
- Decarthron rostratum Park, 1958
- Decarthron scarificatum Brendel, 1893
- Decarthron setosum Bowman, 1934
- Decarthron snowi Park, 1958
- Decarthron stigmosum Brendel, 1865
- Decarthron varicum Park, 1958
- Decarthron velutinum (LeConte, 1849)
