= Bryaxis uljinensis =

Scientific classification
- Kingdom: Animalia
- Phylum: Arthropoda
- Clade: Pancrustacea
- Class: Insecta
- Order: Coleoptera
- Suborder: Polyphaga
- Infraorder: Staphyliniformia
- Family: Staphylinidae
- Genus: Bryaxis
- Species: B. uljinensis

Binomial name
- Bryaxis uljinensis Choi, Park, Lee & Park, 2023

Species of beetle

Bryaxis uljinensis is a species of ant-loving beetle in the family Staphylinidae.

This beetle was first described in 2023 by Yeon-Jae Choi, Sun-Jae Park, Seung-Gyu Lee, and Jong-Seok Park.

The male holotype was collected from leaf litter near a stream in Uljin-gun, South Korea (whence the species epithet, uljinensis). In South Korea this beetle has been found in Gangwon Province and in Gyeongbuk Province, when sifting leaf and soil litter and an ant colony.
