= Bythinus macropalpus =

Scientific classification
- Domain: Eukaryota
- Kingdom: Animalia
- Phylum: Arthropoda
- Class: Insecta
- Order: Coleoptera
- Suborder: Polyphaga
- Infraorder: Staphyliniformia
- Family: Staphylinidae
- Genus: Bythinus
- Species: B. macropalpus

Binomial name
- Bythinus macropalpus Aubé, 1833

Species of beetle

Bythinus macropalpus is a species of beetle belonging to the family Staphylinidae.

It is native to Europe.
