= Bryaxis merkli =

Scientific classification
- Kingdom: Animalia
- Phylum: Arthropoda
- Clade: Pancrustacea
- Class: Insecta
- Order: Coleoptera
- Suborder: Polyphaga
- Infraorder: Staphyliniformia
- Family: Staphylinidae
- Genus: Bryaxis
- Species: B. merkli

Binomial name
- Bryaxis merkli Löbl, 2000

Species of beetle

Bryaxis merkli is a species of ant-loving beetle in the family Staphylinidae.

The species was first described in 2000 by Ivan Löbl, and the species epithet honours the Hungarian entomologist, Otto Merkl.

The species is found in North Korea.
