= Pselaptrichus similis =

Scientific classification
- Kingdom: Animalia
- Phylum: Arthropoda
- Class: Insecta
- Order: Coleoptera
- Suborder: Polyphaga
- Infraorder: Staphyliniformia
- Family: Staphylinidae
- Genus: Pselaptrichus
- Species: P. similis

Binomial name
- Pselaptrichus similis Schuster & Marsh, 1956

Species of beetle

Pselaptrichus similis is a species of ant-loving beetle in the family Staphylinidae. It is found in North America.
