= Nonveilleria lepida =

Scientific classification
- Kingdom: Animalia
- Phylum: Arthropoda
- Class: Insecta
- Order: Coleoptera
- Suborder: Polyphaga
- Infraorder: Staphyliniformia
- Family: Staphylinidae
- Genus: Nonveilleria
- Species: N. lepida

Binomial name
- Nonveilleria lepida (Pavićević & Besuchet, 2003)
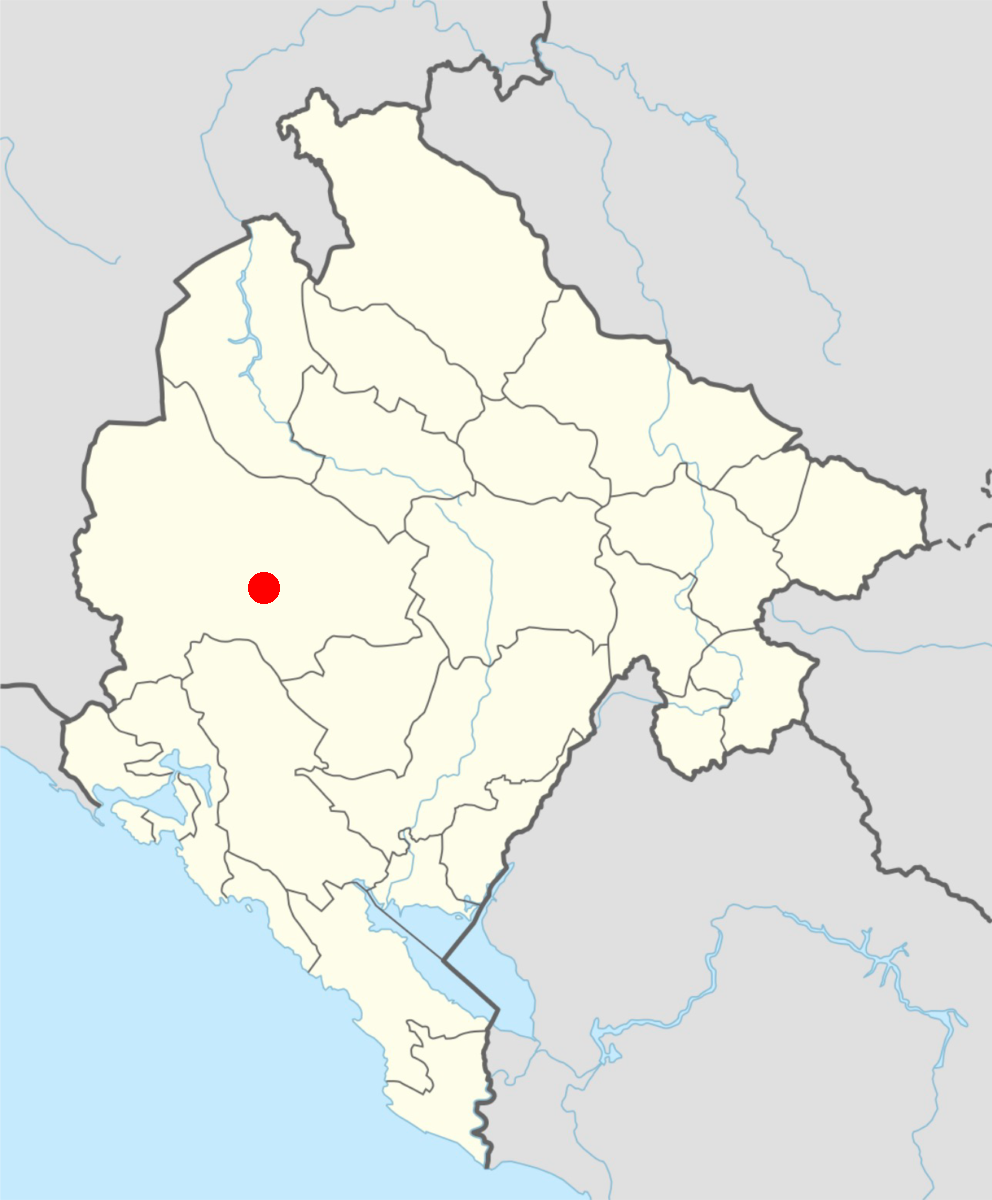

Species of beetle

Nonveilleria lepida is a species of beetle in the family Staphylinidae. It is found in Montenegro.

== Distribution ==
This species is endemic to Montenegro. It is known from a small, unnamed cave and the Velja Peć Cave, both located at Budoš near Nikšić.
