= Gastrobothrus planiventris =

Scientific classification
- Kingdom: Animalia
- Phylum: Arthropoda
- Clade: Pancrustacea
- Class: Insecta
- Order: Coleoptera
- Suborder: Polyphaga
- Infraorder: Staphyliniformia
- Family: Staphylinidae
- Genus: Gastrobothrus
- Species: G. planiventris

Binomial name
- Gastrobothrus planiventris Choi, Leschen & Park, 2026

Species of beetle

Gastrobothrus planiventris is a species of beetle of the family Staphylinidae. It is found in New Zealand (North Island).

== Description ==
Adults reach a length of about 2.53 mm (0.100 in). The body is brown, with the elytra yellowish-brown.

== Life history ==
They have been collected in leaf litter under pine tree, moss from a drainage ditch and in rotten wood.

== Etymology ==
The species name is derived from Latin planus (meaning flat) and ventris (meaning abdomen) and refers to the unmodified abdomen.
