= Brachygluta foveata =

Scientific classification
- Kingdom: Animalia
- Phylum: Arthropoda
- Class: Insecta
- Order: Coleoptera
- Suborder: Polyphaga
- Infraorder: Staphyliniformia
- Family: Staphylinidae
- Genus: Brachygluta
- Species: B. foveata

Binomial name
- Brachygluta foveata (LeConte, 1851)

Species of beetle

Brachygluta foveata is a species of ant-loving beetle in the family Staphylinidae. It is found in North America.
