= Gastrobothrus directus =

Scientific classification
- Kingdom: Animalia
- Phylum: Arthropoda
- Clade: Pancrustacea
- Class: Insecta
- Order: Coleoptera
- Suborder: Polyphaga
- Infraorder: Staphyliniformia
- Family: Staphylinidae
- Genus: Gastrobothrus
- Species: G. directus

Binomial name
- Gastrobothrus directus Choi, Leschen & Park, 2026

Species of beetle

Gastrobothrus directus is a species of beetle of the family Staphylinidae. It is found in New Zealand (North Island).

== Description ==
Adults reach a length of about 2.33 mm (0.092 in). The body is light brown, while the elytra are yellowish-brown.

== Life history ==
They have been collected in leaf litter.

== Etymology ==
The species name is derived from Latin directus (meaning laid straight) and refers to the endophallic armature of this species.
