= Gastrobothrus spinifer =

Scientific classification
- Kingdom: Animalia
- Phylum: Arthropoda
- Clade: Pancrustacea
- Class: Insecta
- Order: Coleoptera
- Suborder: Polyphaga
- Infraorder: Staphyliniformia
- Family: Staphylinidae
- Genus: Gastrobothrus
- Species: G. spinifer

Binomial name
- Gastrobothrus spinifer Choi, Leschen & Park, 2026

Species of beetle

Gastrobothrus spinifer is a species of beetle of the family Staphylinidae. It is found in New Zealand (South Island).

== Description ==
Adults reach a length of about 2.58 mm (0.102 in). The body is reddish-brown.

== Life history ==
They have been collected in broad leaf litter, litter of tussock grass, kanuka, and Schefflera.

== Etymology ==
The species name is derived from Latin spinifer (meaning spiny) and refers to the spines on legs of this species.
