= Gastrobothrus buckleyi =

Scientific classification
- Kingdom: Animalia
- Phylum: Arthropoda
- Clade: Pancrustacea
- Class: Insecta
- Order: Coleoptera
- Suborder: Polyphaga
- Infraorder: Staphyliniformia
- Family: Staphylinidae
- Genus: Gastrobothrus
- Species: G. buckleyi

Binomial name
- Gastrobothrus buckleyi Théry & Leschen, 2013

Species of beetle

Gastrobothrus buckleyi is a species of beetle of the family Staphylinidae. It is found in New Zealand (North Island).

== Life history ==
They have been collected in leaf litter and rotten wood.
