= Reichenbachia borealis =

Scientific classification
- Kingdom: Animalia
- Phylum: Arthropoda
- Class: Insecta
- Order: Coleoptera
- Suborder: Polyphaga
- Infraorder: Staphyliniformia
- Family: Staphylinidae
- Genus: Reichenbachia
- Species: R. borealis

Binomial name
- Reichenbachia borealis Casey, 1897

Synonyms
- Reichenbachia distans Casey, 1897

Species of beetle

Reichenbachia borealis is a species of ant-loving beetle in the family Staphylinidae. It is found in North America.
