= Lucifotychus =

Scientific classification
- Kingdom: Animalia
- Phylum: Arthropoda
- Class: Insecta
- Order: Coleoptera
- Suborder: Polyphaga
- Infraorder: Staphyliniformia
- Family: Staphylinidae
- Supertribe: Goniaceritae
- Tribe: Tychini
- Genus: Lucifotychus; Park & Wagner, 1962

Genus of beetles

Lucifotychus is a genus of beetles in the family Staphylinidae. There are about 19 described species in Lucifotychus.

== Species ==
These 19 species belong to the genus Lucifotychus:

- Lucifotychus agomphius Grigarick & Schuster, 1962
- Lucifotychus bipuncticeps (Casey, 1887)
- Lucifotychus cognatus (LeConte, 1874)
- Lucifotychus confusus (Chandler, 1983)
- Lucifotychus cornus (Grigarick & Schuster, 1962)
- Lucifotychus dentatus (Grigarick & Schuster, 1962)
- Lucifotychus hirsutus Chandler, 1991
- Lucifotychus impellus Park & Wagner, 1962
- Lucifotychus inornatus Grigarick & Schuster, 1964
- Lucifotychus intellectus (Grigarick & Schuster, 1962)
- Lucifotychus newelli Park & Wagner, 1962
- Lucifotychus plumas (Chandler, 1983)
- Lucifotychus puberulus (LeConte, 1851)
- Lucifotychus quirsfeldi Chandler, 1991
- Lucifotychus remipennis (Grigarick & Schuster, 1962)
- Lucifotychus schuhi (Chandler, 1986)
- Lucifotychus simplicis (Grigarick & Schuster, 1962)
- Lucifotychus stellatus (Grigarick & Schuster, 1962)
- Lucifotychus testaceus (Casey, 1884)
