= Reichenbachia facilis =

Scientific classification
- Kingdom: Animalia
- Phylum: Arthropoda
- Class: Insecta
- Order: Coleoptera
- Suborder: Polyphaga
- Infraorder: Staphyliniformia
- Family: Staphylinidae
- Genus: Reichenbachia
- Species: R. facilis

Binomial name
- Reichenbachia facilis (Casey, 1884)

Species of beetle

Reichenbachia facilis is a species of ant-loving beetle in the family Staphylinidae. It is found in North America.
