= Gastrobothrus lunatus =

Scientific classification
- Kingdom: Animalia
- Phylum: Arthropoda
- Clade: Pancrustacea
- Class: Insecta
- Order: Coleoptera
- Suborder: Polyphaga
- Infraorder: Staphyliniformia
- Family: Staphylinidae
- Genus: Gastrobothrus
- Species: G. lunatus

Binomial name
- Gastrobothrus lunatus Choi, Leschen & Park, 2026

Species of beetle

Gastrobothrus lunatus is a species of beetle of the family Staphylinidae. It is found in New Zealand (North Island).

== Description ==
Adults reach a length of about 2.76 mm (0.109 in). The body is brown.

== Life history ==
They have been collected in leaf litter.

== Etymology ==
The species name is derived from Latin lunatus (meaning crescent) and refers to the half-moon-shaped abdominal spatula of this species.
