= Lucifotychus testaceus =

Scientific classification
- Kingdom: Animalia
- Phylum: Arthropoda
- Class: Insecta
- Order: Coleoptera
- Suborder: Polyphaga
- Infraorder: Staphyliniformia
- Family: Staphylinidae
- Genus: Lucifotychus
- Species: L. testaceus

Binomial name
- Lucifotychus testaceus (Casey, 1884)

Species of beetle

Lucifotychus testaceus is a species of ant-loving beetle in the family Staphylinidae. It is found in North America.
