= Eupsenius glaber =

Scientific classification
- Kingdom: Animalia
- Phylum: Arthropoda
- Class: Insecta
- Order: Coleoptera
- Suborder: Polyphaga
- Infraorder: Staphyliniformia
- Family: Staphylinidae
- Genus: Eupsenius
- Species: E. glaber

Binomial name
- Eupsenius glaber LeConte, 1849

Species of beetle

Eupsenius glaber is a species of ant-loving beetle in the family Staphylinidae. It is found in the Caribbean Sea and North America.
