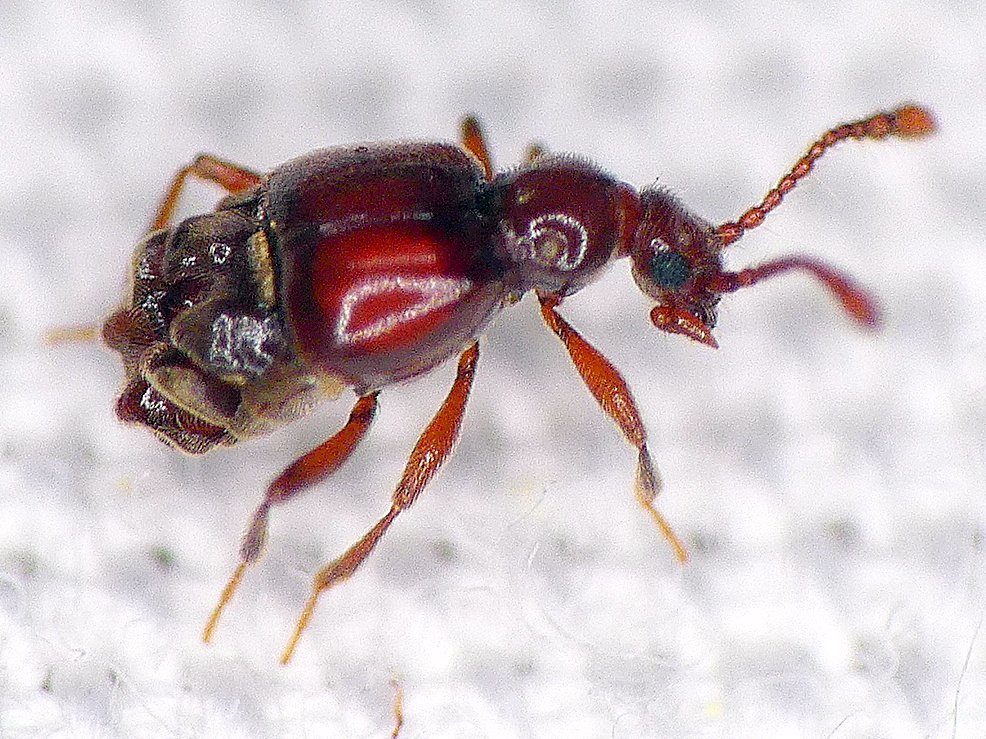

Scientific classification
- Kingdom: Animalia
- Phylum: Arthropoda
- Class: Insecta
- Order: Coleoptera
- Suborder: Polyphaga
- Infraorder: Staphyliniformia
- Family: Staphylinidae
- Genus: Brachygluta
- Species: B. abdominalis

Binomial name
- Brachygluta abdominalis (Aubé, 1833)

= Brachygluta abdominalis =

Species of beetle

Brachygluta abdominalis is a species of ant-loving beetle in the family Staphylinidae. It is found in North America. This species is found in leaf litter of salt marshes, beaches, and other coastal ecosystems.
