= Decarthron stigmosum =

Scientific classification
- Kingdom: Animalia
- Phylum: Arthropoda
- Class: Insecta
- Order: Coleoptera
- Suborder: Polyphaga
- Infraorder: Staphyliniformia
- Family: Staphylinidae
- Genus: Decarthron
- Species: D. stigmosum

Binomial name
- Decarthron stigmosum Brendel, 1865

Synonyms
- Decarthron strenuum Brendel, 1865

Species of beetle

Decarthron stigmosum is a species of ant-loving beetle in the family Staphylinidae. It is found in North America.
