= Gastrobothrus grossus =

Scientific classification
- Kingdom: Animalia
- Phylum: Arthropoda
- Clade: Pancrustacea
- Class: Insecta
- Order: Coleoptera
- Suborder: Polyphaga
- Infraorder: Staphyliniformia
- Family: Staphylinidae
- Genus: Gastrobothrus
- Species: G. grossus

Binomial name
- Gastrobothrus grossus Choi, Leschen & Park, 2026

Species of beetle

Gastrobothrus grossus is a species of beetle of the family Staphylinidae. It is found in New Zealand (North Island).

== Description ==
Adults reach a length of about 3.61 mm (0.142 in). The body is dark brown, with the elytra brighter.

== Etymology ==
The species name is derived from Latin grossus (meaning stout) and refers to thick femora and tibiae of this species.
