= Gastrobothrus =

Scientific classification
- Kingdom: Animalia
- Phylum: Arthropoda
- Clade: Pancrustacea
- Class: Insecta
- Order: Coleoptera
- Suborder: Polyphaga
- Infraorder: Staphyliniformia
- Family: Staphylinidae
- Supertribe: Goniaceritae
- Tribe: Brachyglutini
- Genus: Gastrobothrus; Broun, 1882

Synonyms
- Gastrobothrus Broun, 1886; Eupinogitus Broun, 1921; Physobryaxis Hetschko, 1913

Genus of beetles

Gastrobothrus is a genus of beetles belonging to the family Staphylinidae.

== Species ==
- Gastrobothrus angustus Choi, Leschen & Park, 2026
- Gastrobothrus biligo Choi, Leschen & Park, 2026
- Gastrobothrus buckleyi Théry & Leschen, 2013
- Gastrobothrus directus Choi, Leschen & Park, 2026
- Gastrobothrus giganteus Choi, Leschen & Park, 2026
- Gastrobothrus grossus Choi, Leschen & Park, 2026
- Gastrobothrus ignotus (Broun, 1881)
- Gastrobothrus inflatus (Sharp, 1874)
- Gastrobothrus lunatus Choi, Leschen & Park, 2026
- Gastrobothrus occultus Choi, Leschen & Park, 2026
- Gastrobothrus pilosus Choi, Leschen & Park, 2026
- Gastrobothrus planiventris Choi, Leschen & Park, 2026
- Gastrobothrus platynotus (Broun, 1893)
- Gastrobothrus pumilus Choi, Leschen & Park, 2026
- Gastrobothrus quadrus Choi, Leschen & Park, 2026
- Gastrobothrus retusus Choi, Leschen & Park, 2026
- Gastrobothrus sharpi (Broun, 1880)
- Gastrobothrus spinifer Choi, Leschen & Park, 2026
- Gastrobothrus sulcipennis (Broun, 1921)
- Gastrobothrus trigonus Choi, Leschen & Park, 2026
