= Gastrobothrus pumilus =

Scientific classification
- Kingdom: Animalia
- Phylum: Arthropoda
- Clade: Pancrustacea
- Class: Insecta
- Order: Coleoptera
- Suborder: Polyphaga
- Infraorder: Staphyliniformia
- Family: Staphylinidae
- Genus: Gastrobothrus
- Species: G. pumilus

Binomial name
- Gastrobothrus pumilus Choi, Leschen & Park, 2026

Species of beetle

Gastrobothrus pumilus is a species of beetle of the family Staphylinidae. It is found in New Zealand (North Island).

== Description ==
Adults reach a length of about 1.76 mm (0.069 in). The body is reddish-brown.

== Life history ==
They have been collected in leaf litter and rotten wood.

== Etymology ==
The species name is derived from Latin pumilus (meaning dwarf) and refers to the small body size of this species.
