= Bryaxis grandinodus =

Scientific classification
- Kingdom: Animalia
- Phylum: Arthropoda
- Clade: Pancrustacea
- Class: Insecta
- Order: Coleoptera
- Suborder: Polyphaga
- Infraorder: Staphyliniformia
- Family: Staphylinidae
- Genus: Bryaxis
- Species: B. grandinodus

Binomial name
- Bryaxis grandinodus Choi, Park, Lee & Park, 2023

Species of beetle

Bryaxis grandinodus is a species of ant-loving beetle in the family Staphylinidae.

This beetle was first described in 2023 by Yeon-Jae Choi, Sun-Jae Park, Seung-Gyu Lee, and Jong-Seok Park.

The type specimens were found in Jeonnam Province and on Sinsi & Seonyu Islands in Jeonbuk Province, South Korea.
