= Gastrobothrus giganteus =

Scientific classification
- Kingdom: Animalia
- Phylum: Arthropoda
- Clade: Pancrustacea
- Class: Insecta
- Order: Coleoptera
- Suborder: Polyphaga
- Infraorder: Staphyliniformia
- Family: Staphylinidae
- Genus: Gastrobothrus
- Species: G. giganteus

Binomial name
- Gastrobothrus giganteus Choi, Leschen & Park, 2026

Species of beetle

Gastrobothrus giganteus is a species of beetle of the family Staphylinidae. It is found in New Zealand (North Island).

== Description ==
Adults reach a length of about 3.61 mm (0.142 in). The body is reddish-brown, with the head and pronotum darker.

== Life history ==
They have been collected in leaf litter in mixed deciduous forests.

== Etymology ==
The species name is derived from Latin giganteus (meaning gigantic) and refers to the exceptionally large body size of this species.
