= Reichenbachia appendiculata =

Scientific classification
- Kingdom: Animalia
- Phylum: Arthropoda
- Class: Insecta
- Order: Coleoptera
- Suborder: Polyphaga
- Infraorder: Staphyliniformia
- Family: Staphylinidae
- Genus: Reichenbachia
- Species: R. appendiculata

Binomial name
- Reichenbachia appendiculata Raffray, 1904

Species of beetle

Reichenbachia appendiculata is a species of ant-loving beetle in the family Staphylinidae. It is found in Central America and North America.

A subspecies of Reichenbachia appendiculata is R. appendiculata appendiculata Raffray, 1904.
