= Gastrobothrus biligo =

Scientific classification
- Kingdom: Animalia
- Phylum: Arthropoda
- Clade: Pancrustacea
- Class: Insecta
- Order: Coleoptera
- Suborder: Polyphaga
- Infraorder: Staphyliniformia
- Family: Staphylinidae
- Genus: Gastrobothrus
- Species: G. biligo

Binomial name
- Gastrobothrus biligo Choi, Leschen & Park, 2026

Species of beetle

Gastrobothrus biligo is a species of beetle of the family Staphylinidae. It is found in New Zealand (North Island).

== Description ==
Adults reach a length of about 3.01 mm (0.119 in). The body is reddish-brown, while the elytra are yellowish-brown.

== Life history ==
They have been collected in leaf litter and moss.

== Etymology ==
The species name is derived from Latin bi- (meaning having two parts) and ligo (meaning hoe) and refers to the paired spatulae on abdominal sternite V.
