= Reichenbachia corporalis =

Scientific classification
- Kingdom: Animalia
- Phylum: Arthropoda
- Clade: Pancrustacea
- Class: Insecta
- Order: Coleoptera
- Suborder: Polyphaga
- Infraorder: Staphyliniformia
- Family: Staphylinidae
- Genus: Reichenbachia
- Species: R. corporalis

Binomial name
- Reichenbachia corporalis Casey, 1897

Species of beetle

Reichenbachia corporalis is a species of ant-loving beetle in the family Staphylinidae. It is found in North America.
