= Gastrobothrus pilosus =

Scientific classification
- Kingdom: Animalia
- Phylum: Arthropoda
- Clade: Pancrustacea
- Class: Insecta
- Order: Coleoptera
- Suborder: Polyphaga
- Infraorder: Staphyliniformia
- Family: Staphylinidae
- Genus: Gastrobothrus
- Species: G. pilosus

Binomial name
- Gastrobothrus pilosus Choi, Leschen & Park, 2026

Species of beetle

Gastrobothrus pilosus is a species of beetle of the family Staphylinidae. It is found in New Zealand (North Island).

== Description ==
Adults reach a length of about 2.62 mm (0.103 in). The body is brown, with the head and pronotum darker.

== Life history ==
They have been collected in leaf litter, as well as liverwort and moss from tree bases and on the ground.

== Etymology ==
The species name is derived from Latin pilosus (meaning hairy) and refers to the head coarsely covered with long yellow setae.
