= Gastrobothrus inflatus =

Scientific classification
- Kingdom: Animalia
- Phylum: Arthropoda
- Clade: Pancrustacea
- Class: Insecta
- Order: Coleoptera
- Suborder: Polyphaga
- Infraorder: Staphyliniformia
- Family: Staphylinidae
- Genus: Gastrobothrus
- Species: G. inflatus

Binomial name
- Gastrobothrus inflatus (Sharp, 1874)

Synonyms
- Bryaxis inflata Sharp, 1874; Physobryaxis inflatus

Species of beetle

Gastrobothrus inflatus is a species of beetle of the family Staphylinidae. It is found in New Zealand (North Island).

== Description ==
Adults reach a length of about 2.61–2.79 mm (0.103–0.110 in). The body is reddish-brown, with the elytra and appendages brighter.

== Life history ==
They have been collected in leaf litter and moss in deciduous forests with kauri, as well as in rotten fronds of nikau on the ground.
