= Gastrobothrus retusus =

Scientific classification
- Kingdom: Animalia
- Phylum: Arthropoda
- Clade: Pancrustacea
- Class: Insecta
- Order: Coleoptera
- Suborder: Polyphaga
- Infraorder: Staphyliniformia
- Family: Staphylinidae
- Genus: Gastrobothrus
- Species: G. retusus

Binomial name
- Gastrobothrus retusus Choi, Leschen & Park, 2026

Species of beetle

Gastrobothrus retusus is a species of beetle of the family Staphylinidae. It is found in New Zealand (North Island).

== Description ==
Adults reach a length of about 2.06 mm (0.081 in). The body is reddish-brown, with the head and pronotum slightly darker.

== Life history ==
They have been collected in leaf litter from mixed deciduous forests with kauri.

== Etymology ==
The species name is derived from Latin retusus (meaning blunt) and refers to the shape of tibial spine and spatula.
