= Bryaxis mahunkai =

Scientific classification
- Kingdom: Animalia
- Phylum: Arthropoda
- Clade: Pancrustacea
- Class: Insecta
- Order: Coleoptera
- Suborder: Polyphaga
- Infraorder: Staphyliniformia
- Family: Staphylinidae
- Genus: Bryaxis
- Species: B. mahunkai

Binomial name
- Bryaxis mahunkai Löbl, 1975

Synonyms
- Bryaxis leechanyoungi Nomura & Lee, 1993

Species of beetle

Bryaxis mahunkai is a species of ant-loving beetle in the family Staphylinidae.

The species was first described in 1975 by Ivan Löbl.

The species is endemic to North Korea.
