= Rybaxis conjuncta =

Scientific classification
- Kingdom: Animalia
- Phylum: Arthropoda
- Class: Insecta
- Order: Coleoptera
- Suborder: Polyphaga
- Infraorder: Staphyliniformia
- Family: Staphylinidae
- Genus: Rybaxis
- Species: R. conjuncta

Binomial name
- Rybaxis conjuncta (LeConte, 1849)

Species of beetle

Rybaxis conjuncta is a species of ant-loving beetle in the family Staphylinidae. It is found in North America.
