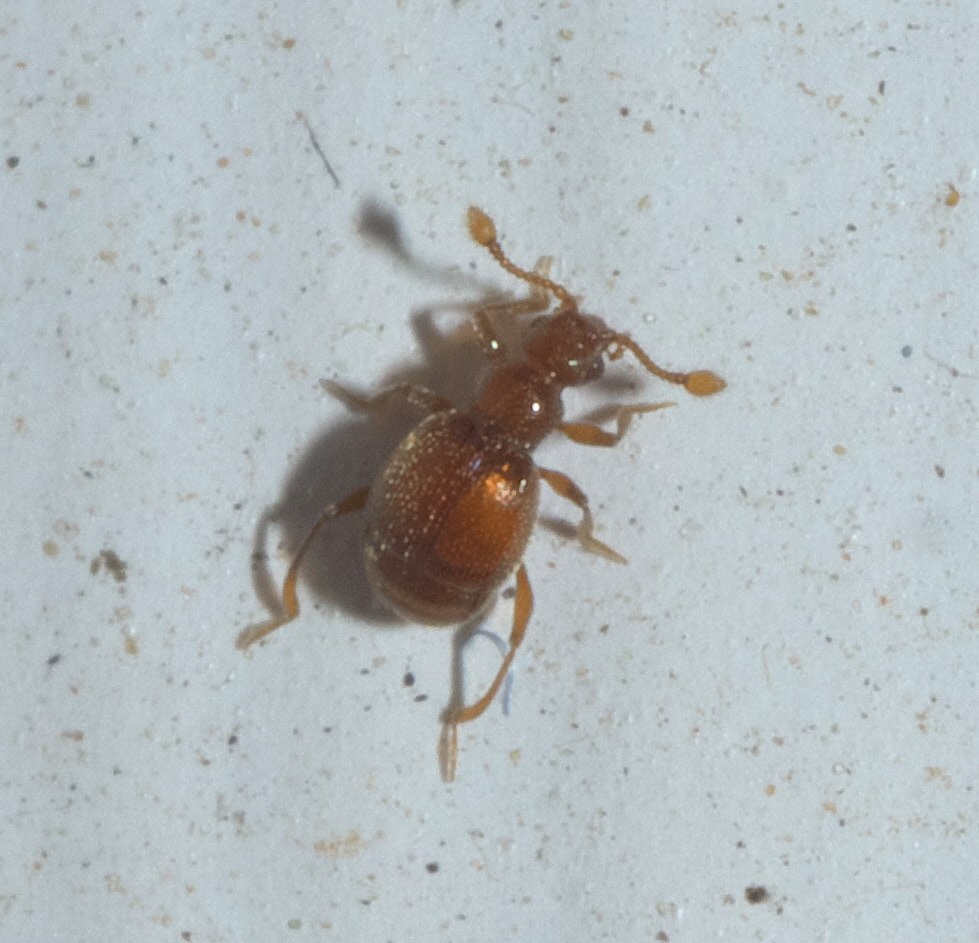
- Eutrichites zonatus

Scientific classification
- Kingdom: Animalia
- Phylum: Arthropoda
- Clade: Pancrustacea
- Class: Insecta
- Order: Coleoptera
- Suborder: Polyphaga
- Infraorder: Staphyliniformia
- Family: Staphylinidae
- Subfamily: Pselaphinae
- Supertribe: Goniaceritae; Reitter, 1882

= Goniaceritae =

Supertribe of beetles

Goniaceritae is a supertribe of ant-loving beetles in the family Staphylinidae. There are about 16 genera and at least 30 described species in Goniaceritae in North Amica.

This supertribe was first described in 1882 by Edmund Reitter, and the type genus is Goniacerus Motschulsky, 1855.

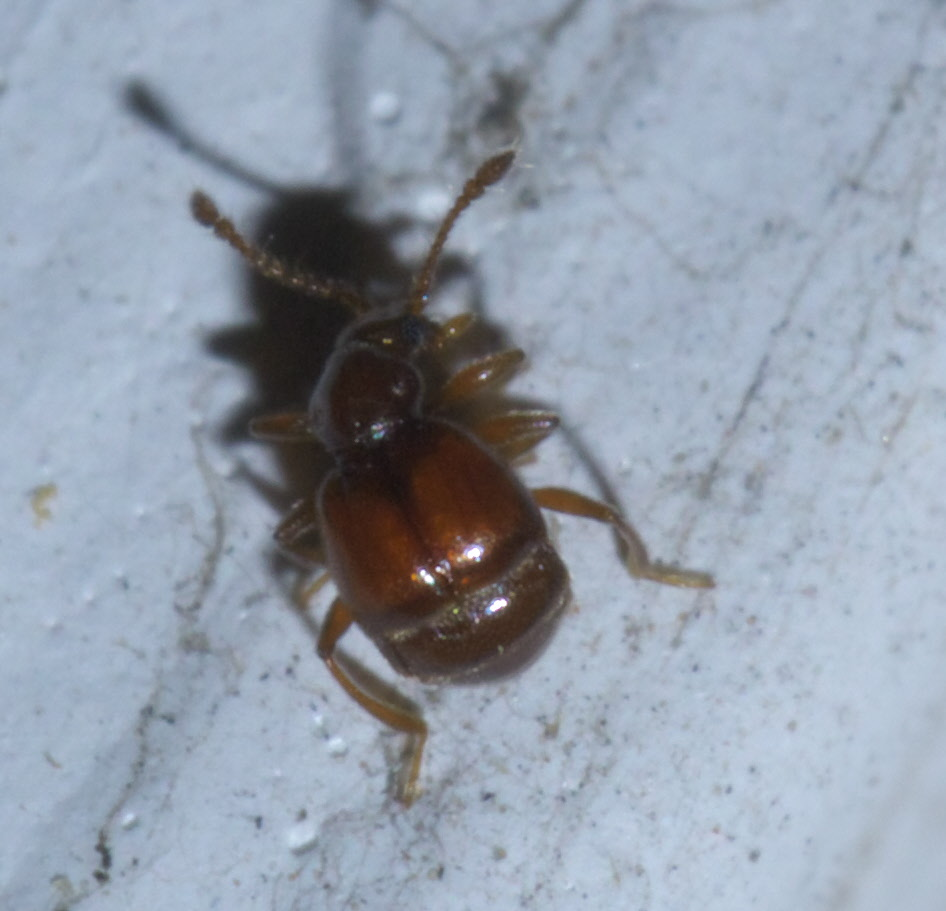
Reichenbachia

== Selected genera ==
These genera belong to the supertribe Goniaceritae:

- Brachygluta Thomson, 1859^{i c g b}
- Custotychus Park & Wagner, 1962^{i c g b}
- Cylindrarctus Schaufuss, 1887^{i c g b}
- Decarthron Brendel, 1865^{i c g b}
- Eupsenius LeConte, 1849^{i c g b}
- Eutrichites LeConte, 1880^{i c g b}
- Gastrobothrus Broun, 1882
- Lucifotychus Park & Wagner, 1962^{i c g b}
- Machaerodes Brendel, 1890^{i c g b}
- Nearctitychus Chandler, 1988^{i c g b}
- Nipponobythus Jeannel, 1958^{g b}
- Nisaxis Casey, 1886^{i c g b}
- Pselaptrichus Brendel, 1889^{i c g b}
- Reichenbachia Leach, 1826^{i c g b}
- Rybaxis Saulcy, 1876^{i c g b}
- Tychobythinus Ganglbauer, 1896^{i c g b}
- Tychus Leach, 1817^{c g b}
- Valda Casey, 1894^{i c g b}

Data sources: i = ITIS, c = Catalogue of Life, g = GBIF, b = Bugguide.net
