= Valda (beetle) =

Scientific classification
- Kingdom: Animalia
- Phylum: Arthropoda
- Class: Insecta
- Order: Coleoptera
- Suborder: Polyphaga
- Infraorder: Staphyliniformia
- Family: Staphylinidae
- Supertribe: Goniaceritae
- Tribe: Valdini
- Genus: Valda; Casey, 1894

Genus of beetles

Valda is a genus of ant-loving beetles in the family Staphylinidae. There is at least one described species in Valda, V. frontalis.
