= Pselaptrichus =

Scientific classification
- Domain: Eukaryota
- Kingdom: Animalia
- Phylum: Arthropoda
- Class: Insecta
- Order: Coleoptera
- Suborder: Polyphaga
- Infraorder: Staphyliniformia
- Family: Staphylinidae
- Tribe: Bythinini
- Genus: Pselaptrichus; Brendel, 1889

Genus of beetles

Pselaptrichus is a genus of ant-loving beetles in the family Staphylinidae. There are more than 30 described species in Pselaptrichus.

== Species ==
These 38 species belong to the genus Pselaptrichus:

- Pselaptrichus auctumnus Chandler, 1983
- Pselaptrichus burdicki Schuster & Marsh, 1956
- Pselaptrichus carinatus Marsh & Schuster, 1954
- Pselaptrichus cavatus Marsh & Schuster, 1954
- Pselaptrichus chandleri Schuster & Marsh, 1956
- Pselaptrichus cornus Chandler, 1983
- Pselaptrichus curiosus Park, 1953
- Pselaptrichus cuspidatus Schuster & Marsh, 1956
- Pselaptrichus frigidus Schuster & Marsh, 1956
- Pselaptrichus gibbosus Marsh & Schuster, 1954
- Pselaptrichus helferi Schuster & Marsh, 1956
- Pselaptrichus hocus Schuster & Marsh, 1956
- Pselaptrichus incognitus Schuster & Marsh, 1956
- Pselaptrichus intimus Schuster & Marsh, 1956
- Pselaptrichus levinei Schuster & Marsh, 1956
- Pselaptrichus loebli Chandler, 2003
- Pselaptrichus magaliae Chandler, 1983
- Pselaptrichus marshi Chandler, 1983
- Pselaptrichus minimus Schuster & Marsh, 1956
- Pselaptrichus oculatus Marsh & Schuster, 1954
- Pselaptrichus ornatus Marsh & Schuster, 1954
- Pselaptrichus parki Schuster & Marsh, 1956
- Pselaptrichus pennatus Schuster & Marsh, 1956
- Pselaptrichus perditus Schuster & Marsh, 1956
- Pselaptrichus perfidus Schuster & Marsh, 1956
- Pselaptrichus plusculus Park & Wagner, 1962
- Pselaptrichus propinquus Schuster & Marsh, 1956
- Pselaptrichus proprius Schuster & Marsh, 1956
- Pselaptrichus rectus Marsh & Schuster, 1954
- Pselaptrichus rothi Park, 1953
- Pselaptrichus shastensis Schuster & Marsh, 1956
- Pselaptrichus silvanus Schuster & Marsh, 1956
- Pselaptrichus similis Schuster & Marsh, 1956
- Pselaptrichus spinosus Marsh & Schuster, 1954
- Pselaptrichus tenuis Schuster & Marsh, 1956
- Pselaptrichus tuberculipalpus Brendel, 1889
- Pselaptrichus vanus Schuster & Marsh, 1956
- Pselaptrichus venustrus Schuster & Marsh, 1956
