= Valda James =

Mayor of Islington

Valda James (born 1928) is the former mayor of Islington. She was the first black woman elected to Islington Council and the borough's first black mayor.

== Life ==
James was born in Saint Thomas Parish, Jamaica, and moved to England in 1961, as part of the Windrush generation. Following the end of her marriage, James raised her children as a single parent, 'an experience that later informed her work on the Social Services committee.' James worked first in catering and dressmaking, in order to support herself and her family, before becoming a nurse with the British Red Cross for eight years.

James was elected to Islington Council in 1986, and became mayor two years later. In order to take up the post, James took early retirement from her existing job, affecting her pension, and was additionally unable to claim councillors' attendance allowances because mayoral duties did not leave enough time to carry out the functions required of a councillor. In order to support herself financially, James worked from 5.30am as a cleaning supervisor, before the start of her working day as Mayor.

While Mayor, in 1989, James founded a Sickle Cell Support Group in Camden, which was 'primarily set up to be a forum for people with sickle cell and thalassaemia diseases to meet and get to know and support each other.'

In 2018, as part of the LDN WMN initiative celebrating 100 years since the first women gained the vote in Britain, a photograph of James by her granddaughter, the artist Phoebe Collings-James, was displayed on the outside of The Peel Institute, Islington. The artwork 'celebrates the cultural impact left by James on the Borough and is located close to the estate where she lived all her life'.
