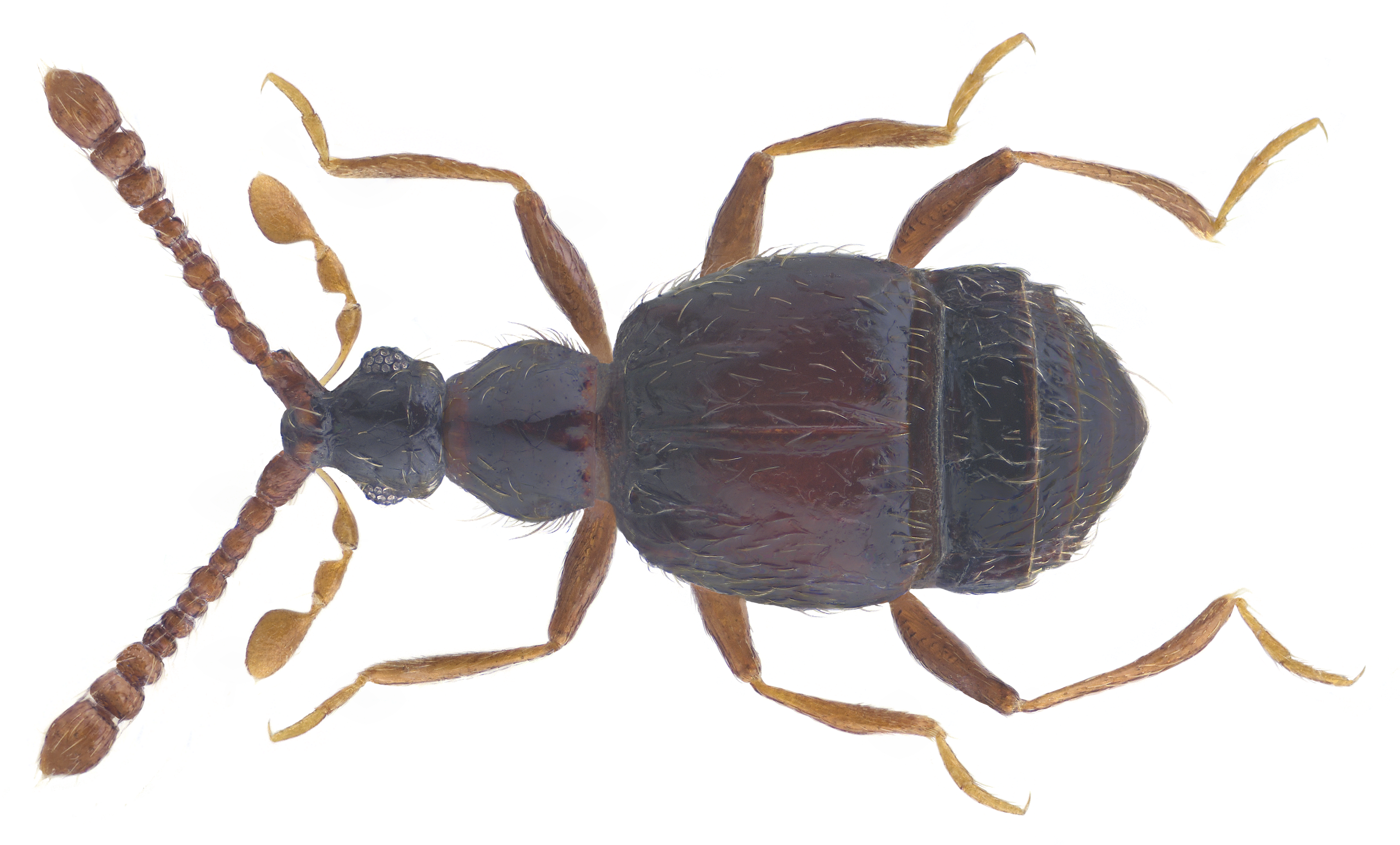
- Tychus niger

Scientific classification
- Kingdom: Animalia
- Phylum: Arthropoda
- Class: Insecta
- Order: Coleoptera
- Suborder: Polyphaga
- Infraorder: Staphyliniformia
- Family: Staphylinidae
- Genus: Tychus; Leach, 1817

= Tychus =

Genus of beetles

Tychus is a genus of beetles belonging to the family Staphylinidae.

The species of this genus are found in Europe and Northern America.

Species:

- Tychus aculeatus (Schuster & Marsh, 1958)
- Tychus adustus (Schuster & Marsh, 1958)
