= Machaerodes =

Scientific classification
- Kingdom: Animalia
- Phylum: Arthropoda
- Class: Insecta
- Order: Coleoptera
- Suborder: Polyphaga
- Infraorder: Staphyliniformia
- Family: Staphylinidae
- Tribe: Bythinini
- Genus: Machaerodes; Brendel, 1890

Genus of beetles

Machaerodes is a genus of ant-loving beetles in the family Staphylinidae. There is one described species in Machaerodes, M. carinatus.
