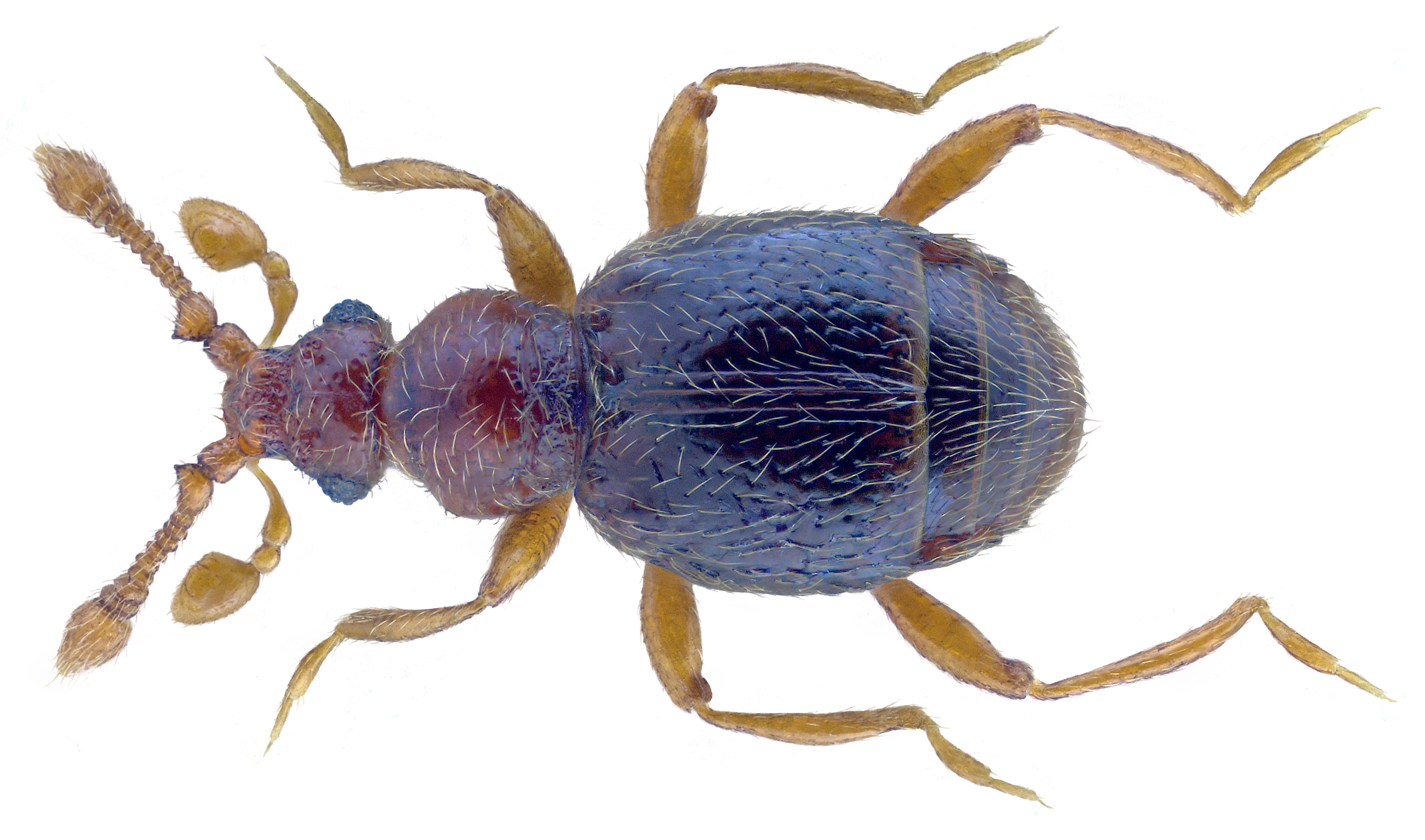
- Bythinus burrellii

Scientific classification
- Kingdom: Animalia
- Phylum: Arthropoda
- Class: Insecta
- Order: Coleoptera
- Suborder: Polyphaga
- Infraorder: Staphyliniformia
- Family: Staphylinidae
- Genus: Bythinus; Leach, 1817

= Bythinus =

Genus of beetles

Bythinus is a genus of beetle belonging to the family Staphylinidae.

The genus was first described by Leach in 1817.

Species:

- Bythinus macropalpus
- Bythinus niger King, 1866
