= List of Dilophus species =

This is a list of 212 species in the genus Dilophus.

== Dilophus species ==
- Dilophus aberratus Hardy, 1982
- Dilophus acutidens Edwards, 1929
- Dilophus aegyptius Costa, 1878
- Dilophus alpinus Harrison, 1990
- Dilophus andalusiacus Strobl, 1900
- Dilophus anomalus (Hardy, 1942)
- Dilophus antarcticus (Walker, 1836)
- Dilophus antipedalis Wiedemann, 1818
- Dilophus aquilonia Hardy & Takahashi, 1960
- Dilophus arboreus Fitzgerald, 2004
- Dilophus arenarius Edwards, 1935
- Dilophus arizonaensis (Hardy, 1937)
- Dilophus ater (Philippi, 1865)
- Dilophus atrimas Edwards, 1914
- Dilophus atripennis Hardy, 1982
- Dilophus bakeri (Hardy, 1951)
- Dilophus balfouri Edwards, 1935
- Dilophus beckeri Hardy, 1948
- Dilophus bicolor Macquart, 1838
- Dilophus bicoloripes Edwards, 1938
- Dilophus bipunctatus Luo & Yang, 1988
- Dilophus bispinosus Lundstrom, 1913
- Dilophus borealis Skartveit, 1993
- Dilophus brazilensis (Hardy, 1948)
- Dilophus breviceps Loew, 1869
- Dilophus brevifemur Lundstrom, 1913
- Dilophus brevirostrum Hardy & Takahashi, 1960
- Dilophus buxtoni (Hardy, 1948)
- Dilophus calcaratus Edwards, 1930
- Dilophus cantrelli Hardy, 1982
- Dilophus capensis Edwards, 1925
- Dilophus carbonarius (Philippi, 1865)
- Dilophus castanipes (Bigot, 1888)
- Dilophus caurinus Mcatee, 1922
- Dilophus clavicornus Skartveit & Kaplan, 1996
- Dilophus collaris Guérin-Méneville, 1844
- Dilophus collessi Hardy, 1982
- Dilophus conformis Hardy, 1968
- Dilophus conspicuus Hardy, 1982
- Dilophus crassicornis Skartveit, 2009
- Dilophus crassicrus Lundstrom, 1913
- Dilophus crenulatus Hardy & Delfinado, 1969
- Dilophus crinitus (Hardy, 1951)
- Dilophus desistens Walker, 1861
- Dilophus dichromatus Hardy, 1968
- Dilophus dichrous Edwards, 1938
- Dilophus disagrus (Speiser, 1909)
- Dilophus discretus Hardy, 1982
- Dilophus distinguendus Edwards, 1935
- Dilophus dorsalis (Philippi, 1865)
- Dilophus dubius Elmo Hardy, 1982
- Dilophus edwardsi (Hardy, 1948)
- Dilophus elephas Edwards, 1935
- Dilophus emarginatus Mcatee, 1922
- Dilophus ephippium (Philippi, 1865)
- Dilophus erythraeus Bezzi, 1906
- Dilophus espeletiae Sturm, 1990
- Dilophus exiguus (Hardy, 1951)
- Dilophus febrilis (Linnaeus, 1758)
- Dilophus femoratus Meigen, 1804
- Dilophus flavicornis Edwards, 1938
- Dilophus flavicrus Hardy, 1982
- Dilophus flavifemur Edwards, 1930
- Dilophus flavihalter Edwards, 1930
- Dilophus flavistigma Edwards, 1935
- Dilophus flavitarsis Edwards, 1938
- Dilophus fulvicoxa Walker, 1848
- Dilophus fulvimacula (Walker, 1848)
- Dilophus fulviventris Hardy & Takahashi, 1960
- Dilophus fumipennis Harrison, 1990
- Dilophus fumosus Coquillett, 1904
- Dilophus gagatinus (Philippi, 1865)
- Dilophus giganteus Macquart, 1846
- Dilophus globosus (Hardy, 1942)
- Dilophus golbachi (Hardy, 1953)
- Dilophus gracilipes Edwards, 1930
- Dilophus gracilis Hardy, 1968
- Dilophus gratiosus Bigot, 1890
- Dilophus harrisoni Hardy, 1953
- Dilophus hiemalis Becker, 1908
- Dilophus hirsutus Hardy, 1965
- Dilophus hortulana (Linnaeus, 1758)
- Dilophus humeralis Zetterstedt, 1850
- Dilophus hummeli Duda, 1934
- Dilophus hyalipennis (Blanchard, 1852)
- Dilophus immaculipennis (Blanchard, 1852)
- Dilophus inconnexus (Hardy, 1961)
- Dilophus innubilus Hardy & Delfinado, 1969
- Dilophus insolitus Hutton, 1902
- Dilophus interruptus Edwards, 1930
- Dilophus jilinensis Yang & Luo, 1989
- Dilophus kagoshimaensis Okada, 1938
- Dilophus lateralis (Philippi, 1865)
- Dilophus lii Yang & Luo, 1987
- Dilophus lingens Loew, 1869
- Dilophus longiceps Loew, 1861
- Dilophus longipilosus Hardy, 1982
- Dilophus longirostris Macquart, 1850
- Dilophus lucidus (Hardy, 1948)
- Dilophus lucifer Schiner, 1868
- Dilophus luteicollis (Philippi, 1865)
- Dilophus luteus Edwards, 1930
- Dilophus macrorhinus Macquart, 1838
- Dilophus macrosiphonius Yang & Luo, 1989
- Dilophus maculatus Bellardi, 1859
- Dilophus maculipennis Blanchard, 1852
- Dilophus maghrebensis Haenni, 1981
- Dilophus martinovskyi Haenni & Bosak, 2007
- Dilophus matilei Waller, Nel & Menier, 2000
- Dilophus mcalpinei Hardy, 1982
- Dilophus megacanthus Edwards, 1938
- Dilophus melanarius Wulp, 1881
- Dilophus membranaceus Yang & Luo, 1989
- Dilophus microcerus Edwards, 1935
- Dilophus minimus (Hardy, 1942)
- Dilophus minor Strobl, 1900
- Dilophus minutus Bellardi, 1862
- Dilophus modicus Hardy, 1982
- Dilophus multispinosus (Hardy, 1951)
- Dilophus neglectus Haenni, 1982
- Dilophus neoinsolitus Harrison, 1990
- Dilophus niger (Hardy, 1937)
- Dilophus nigripes Blanchard, 1852
- Dilophus nigrivenatus Yang & Luo, 1989
- Dilophus nigriventris Meijere, 1913
- Dilophus nigrostigma Walker, 1848
- Dilophus novemmaculatus (de Villers, 1789)
- Dilophus nubilipennis Edwards, 1935
- Dilophus nuptus (Speiser, 1914)
- Dilophus obesulus Loew, 1869
- Dilophus obscuripennis Lundstrom, 1913
- Dilophus obscurus (Blanchard, 1852)
- Dilophus obsoletus (Hardy, 1951)
- Dilophus obtusus Edwards, 1932
- Dilophus occipitalis Coquillett, 1904
- Dilophus oceanus Haenni & Baez, 2001
- Dilophus orbatus (Say, 1823)
- Dilophus ornatus (Hardy, 1942)
- Dilophus palaeofebrilis Skartveit, 2009
- Dilophus palidipennis Philippi, 1865
- Dilophus pallens (Blanchard, 1852)
- Dilophus partitus Hardy, 1982
- Dilophus parvus Hardy, 1982
- Dilophus patagonicus Edwards, 1930
- Dilophus paucidens Hardy, 1962
- Dilophus paulseni Philippi, 1865
- Dilophus pectoralis Wiedemann, 1828
- Dilophus peruensis (Hardy, 1948)
- Dilophus philippii (Hardy, 1960)
- Dilophus pictilis Hardy & Delfinado, 1969
- Dilophus pictipes Skuse, 1889
- Dilophus pictus Schiner, 1868
- Dilophus piliferus Edwards, 1935
- Dilophus plagiospinae Yang & Luo, 1987
- Dilophus plaumanni Edwards, 1938
- Dilophus poikilospinalis Yang & Luo, 1988
- Dilophus proxilus Fitzgerald, 2004
- Dilophus proximus Mcatee, 1922
- Dilophus quadridens (Hardy, 1953)
- Dilophus quinquespinae (Hardy, 1961)
- Dilophus quintanus (Hardy, 1951)
- Dilophus rhynchops Coquillett, 1904
- Dilophus rubidus Edwards, 1926
- Dilophus rubiginosus Duda, 1930
- Dilophus rubricollis (Blanchard, 1852)
- Dilophus rubripes (Philippi, 1865)
- Dilophus rufipes Blanchard, 1852
- Dilophus sayi (Hardy, 1960)
- Dilophus scabricollis Edwards, 1929
- Dilophus sectus Mcatee, 1922
- Dilophus segnis Hutton, 1901
- Dilophus segregatus (Hardy, 1961)
- Dilophus serenus (Hardy, 1953)
- Dilophus serotinus Loew, 1861
- Dilophus serraticollis Walker, 1848
- Dilophus sexspinosus Hardy, 1982
- Dilophus similis Rondani, 1868
- Dilophus skusei Hardy, 1982
- Dilophus spinipes Say, 1823
- Dilophus splendens (Hardy, 1951)
- Dilophus stigmaterus Say, 1823
- Dilophus strigilatus Mcatee, 1922
- Dilophus stygius Say, 1832
- Dilophus suberythreus Edwards, 1914
- Dilophus sublacteatus Edwards, 1932
- Dilophus succineus Skartveit, 2009
- Dilophus surrufus Hardy, 1982
- Dilophus tapir Schiner, 1868
- Dilophus tenuis Wiedemann, 1818
- Dilophus tersus Hardy, 1982
- Dilophus testaceipes Blanchard, 1852
- Dilophus tetracanthus Edwards, 1930
- Dilophus tetrascolus Hardy, 1982
- Dilophus tibialistibialis Loew, 1870
- Dilophus tingi (Hardy, 1942)
- Dilophus transvestis Hardy, 1968
- Dilophus tricuspidatus Hardy, 1982
- Dilophus tridentatus Walker, 1848
- Dilophus trispinosus Edwards, 1929
- Dilophus trisulcatus Macquart, 1838
- Dilophus tuthilli Hardy, 1953
- Dilophus valdivianus Philippi, 1865
- Dilophus variceps Hardy, 1942
- Dilophus varipes Skuse, 1890
- Dilophus venulatus Johnson, 1919
- Dilophus vicarius (Hardy, 1948)
- Dilophus villosus Edwards, 1936
- Dilophus vittatus Philippi, 1865
