= Spinipes =

spinipes may refer to:

- Aethalochroa spinipes, species of praying mantis in the family Toxoderidae
- Architis spinipes, species of spider from the genus Architis
- Caccoplectus spinipes, species of ant-loving beetle in the family Staphylinidae
- Clivina spinipes, species of ground beetle in the subfamily Scaritinae
- Cryptops spinipes, species of centipede in the family Cryptopidae
- Dilophus spinipes, species of March fly in the family Bibionidae
- Eleodes spinipes, species of desert stink beetle in the family Tenebrionidae
- Euscaphurus spinipes, species of plate-thigh beetle in the family Eucinetidae
- Eustictus spinipes, species of plant bug in the family Miridae
- Hyagnis spinipes, species of beetle in the family Cerambycidae
- Lophosaurus spinipes species of agamid lizard endemic to Australia
- Metepeira spinipes, species of orb weaver in the spider family Araneidae
- Odynerus spinipes, the spiny mason wasp, species of potter wasp in the family Vespidae
- Sepedon spinipes, species of fly in the family Sciomyzidae
- Sinea spinipes, species of assassin bug in the family Reduviidae, subfamily Harpactorinae
- Trigona spinipes, species of stingless bee in the family Apidae
- Troglohyphantes spinipes, species of spider in the family Linyphiidae
- Xylota spinipes, species of hoverfly in the family Syrphidae
- Zabrus spinipes, species of ground beetle in the family Carabidae
- Zethus spinipes, species of stinging wasp in the family Vespidae
