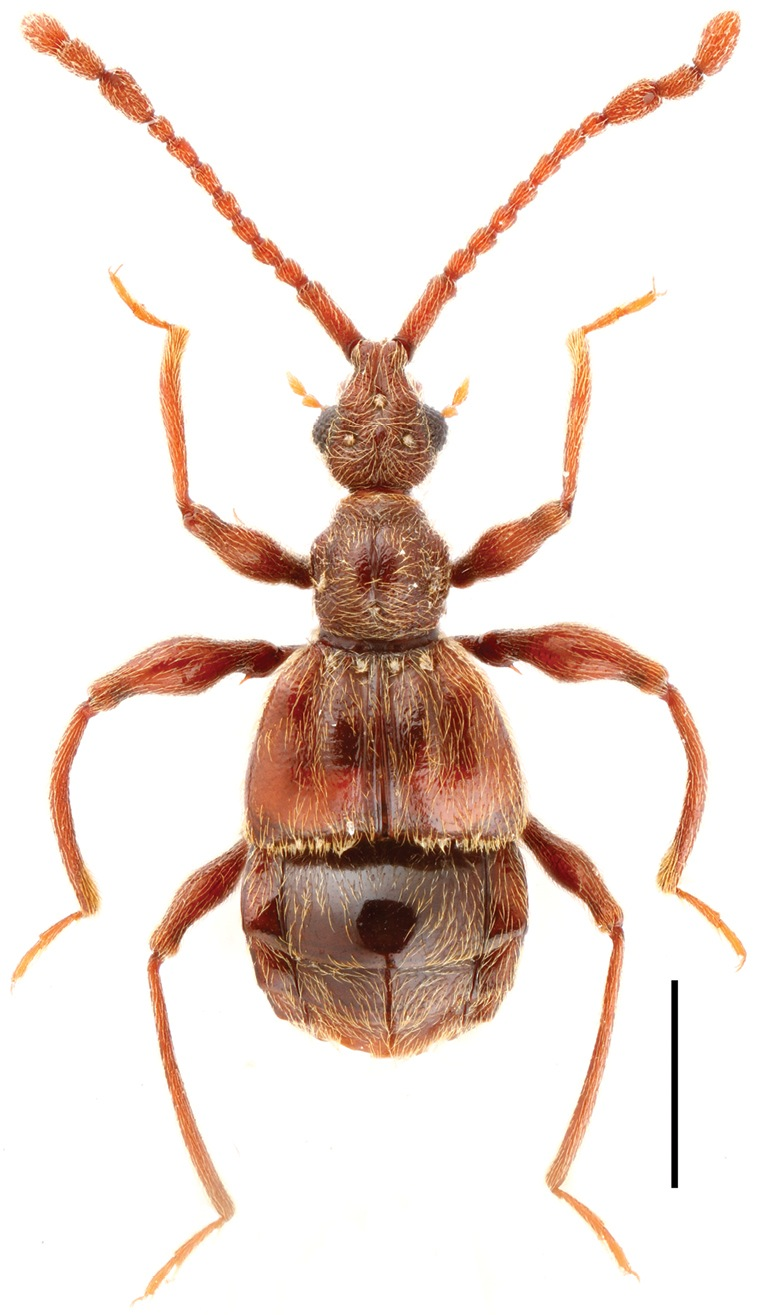
- Male habitus of Pselaphodes wrasei

Scientific classification
- Kingdom: Animalia
- Phylum: Arthropoda
- Class: Insecta
- Order: Coleoptera
- Suborder: Polyphaga
- Infraorder: Staphyliniformia
- Family: Staphylinidae
- Subfamily: Pselaphinae
- Supertribe: Pselaphitae
- Tribe: Tyrini
- Subtribe: Tyrina
- Genus: Pselaphodes; Westwood, 1870

= Pselaphodes =

Genus of beetles

Pselaphodes is a genus of rove beetles.

== Species ==
- Pselaphodes aculeus Yin, Li & Zhao, 2010
- Pselaphodes anhuianus Yin & Li, in Yin, Hlaváč & Li, 2013
- Pselaphodes daii Yin & Hlaváč, in, Yin, Hlaváč & Li, 2013
- Pselaphodes grebennikovi Yin & Hlaváč, in, Yin, Hlaváč & Li, 2013
- Pselaphodes hainanensis Yin & Li, in, Yin, Hlaváč & Li, 2013
- Pselaphodes kuankuoshuiensis Yin & Li, in, Yin, Hlaváč & Li, 2013
- Pselaphodes longilobus Yin & Hlaváč, in, Yin, Hlaváč & Li, 2013
- Pselaphodes maoershanus Yin & Li, 2012
- Pselaphodes monoceros Yin & Hlaváč, in Yin, Hlaváč & Li, 2013
- Pselaphodes pectinatus Yin, Li & Zhao, 2011
- Pselaphodes pengi Yin & Li, in Yin, Hlaváč & Li, 2013
- Pselaphodes tianmuensis Yin, Li & Zhao, 2010
- Pselaphodes tiantongensis Yin & Li, in, Yin, Hlaváč & Li, 2013
- Pselaphodes wrasei Yin & Li, in, Yin, Hlaváč & Li, 2013
- Pselaphodes walkeri Sharp, 1892
