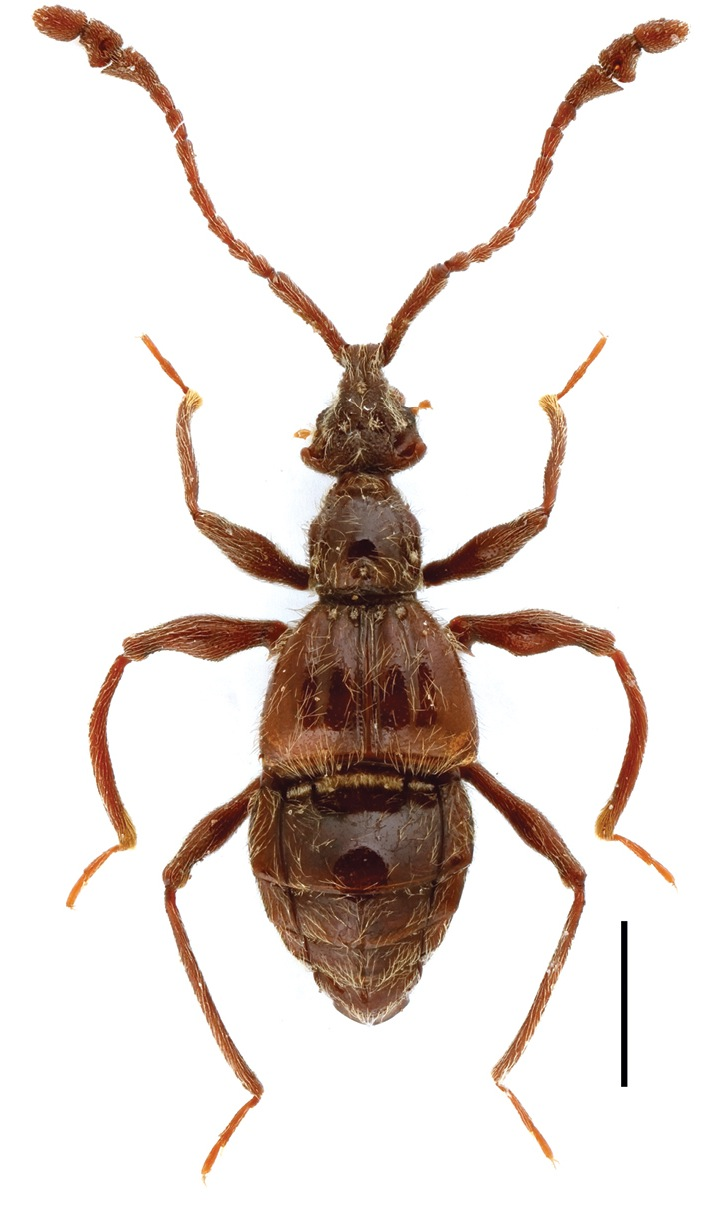
- Labomimus schuelkei

Scientific classification
- Kingdom: Animalia
- Phylum: Arthropoda
- Class: Insecta
- Order: Coleoptera
- Suborder: Polyphaga
- Infraorder: Staphyliniformia
- Family: Staphylinidae
- Subfamily: Pselaphinae
- Supertribe: Pselaphitae
- Tribe: Tyrini
- Subtribe: Tyrina
- Genus: Labomimus; Sharp, 1883

= Labomimus =

Genus of beetles

Labomimus is a genus of rove beetles.

== Species ==
- Labomimus fimbriatus Yin & Hlaváč, in Yin, Hlaváč & Li, 2013
- Labomimus jizuensis Yin & Hlaváč, in Yin, Hlaváč & Li, 2013
- Labomimus sichuanicus Hlaváč, Nomura & Zhou, 2000
- Labomimus simplicipalpus Yin & Hlaváč, 2013, in Yin, Hlaváč & Li, 2013
- Labomimus tibialis (Yin & Li, 2012)
- Labomimus venustus (Yin & Li, 2012)
- Labomimus yunnanicus Hlaváč, Nomura & Zhou, 2000
