= Dayao (disambiguation) =

Dayao primarily refers to Dayao County (大姚县), a county of Chuxiong Yi Autonomous Prefecture, Yunnan, PRC.

Dayao may also refer to these other settlements in the PRC:

- Dayao, Liuyang (大瑤镇), town in Liuyang City, Hunan
- Dayao, Yantai (大窑镇), town in Muping District, Yantai, Shandong

Dayao is also a genus of rove beetle.
