= Centrophthalmus =

Scientific classification
- Kingdom: Animalia
- Phylum: Arthropoda
- Class: Insecta
- Order: Coleoptera
- Suborder: Polyphaga
- Infraorder: Staphyliniformia
- Family: Staphylinidae
- Subfamily: Pselaphinae
- Supertribe: Pselaphitae
- Tribe: Tyrini
- Subtribe: Centrophthalmina
- Genus: Centrophthalmus; Schmidt-Göbel, 1838

Species
- Several, including: Centrophthalmus elegans Raffray 1912; Centrophthalmus punctipennis Schaufuss, L.W., 1877; Centrophthalmus sinensis Raffray, 1904

Synonyms
- Camaldites (Jeannel, 1950); Camaldus (Fairmaire, 1863); Centrophthalmosis (Raffray, 1904)

Genus of beetles

Centrophthalmus is a genus of beetles in the subfamily Pselaphinae. Species have a palaearctic distribution in Eurasia and Asia.
