= Tmesiphorini =

Scientific classification
- Kingdom: Animalia
- Phylum: Arthropoda
- Clade: Pancrustacea
- Class: Insecta
- Order: Coleoptera
- Suborder: Polyphaga
- Infraorder: Staphyliniformia
- Family: Staphylinidae
- Subfamily: Pselaphinae
- Supertribe: Pselaphitae
- Tribe: Tmesiphorini; Jeannel, 1949

Tribe of beetles

Tmesiphorini is a tribe of rove beetles.

== Genera ==
- Saltisedes
- Tmesiphorus
