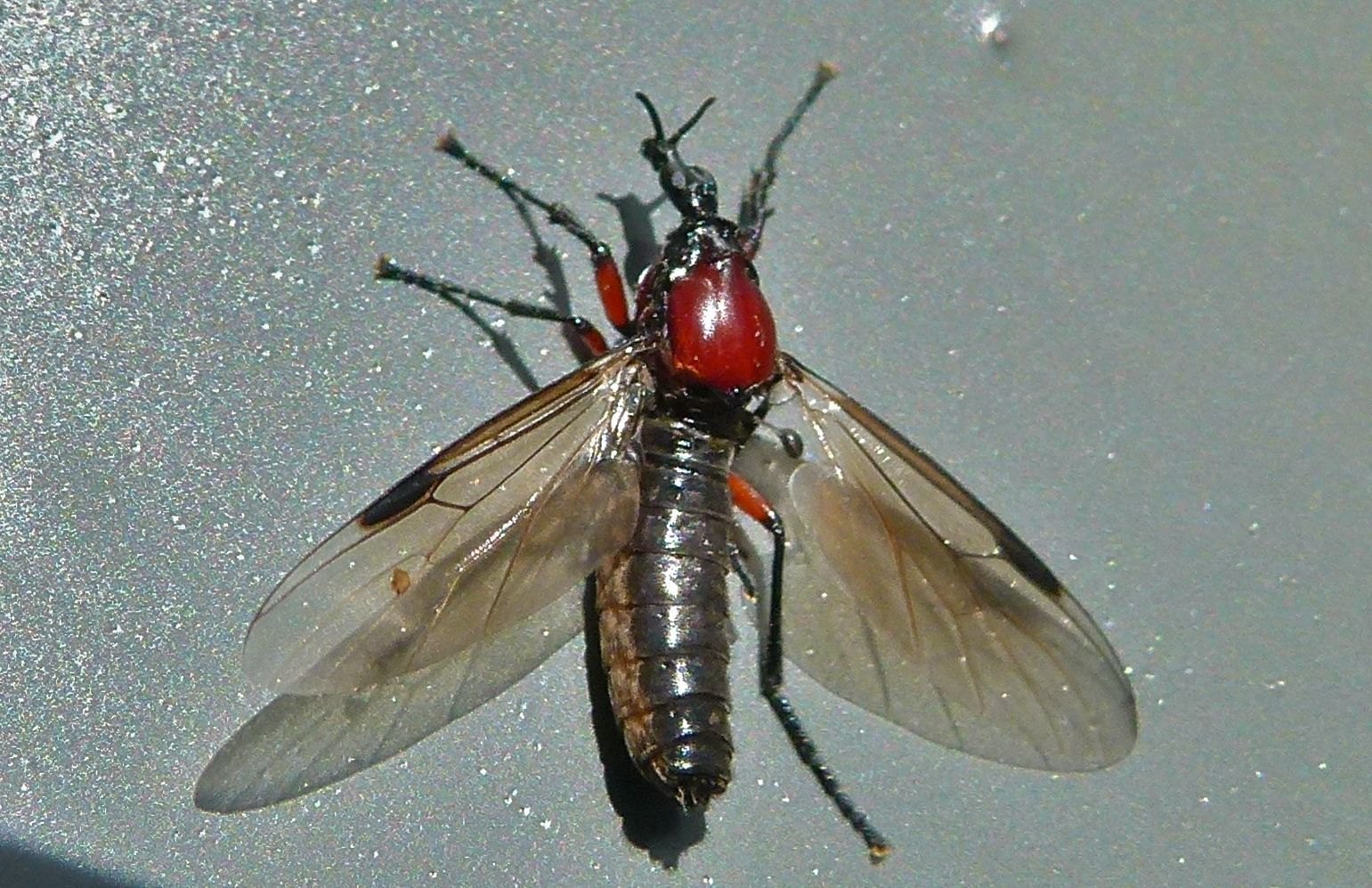
- Female

Scientific classification
- Kingdom: Animalia
- Phylum: Arthropoda
- Clade: Pancrustacea
- Class: Insecta
- Order: Diptera
- Family: Bibionidae
- Genus: Dilophus
- Species: D. nigrostigma

Binomial name
- Dilophus nigrostigma (Walker, 1848)

Synonyms
- Bibio nigrostigma; Bibio zealandicus; Dilophus spectabilis

= Dilophus nigrostigma =

Species of insect

Dilophus nigrostigma is a species of Bibionidae fly endemic to New Zealand. It is the largest and most common species of Dilophus in New Zealand.

== Taxonomy ==
Dilophus nigrostigma was first described as Bibio nigrostigma in 1848 by English entomologist Francis Walker. In 1901, Frederick Hutton reclassified the species into the genus Dilophus. D. nigrostigma was last revised in 1990.

== Description ==
Compared to other New Zealand endemic Dilophus, D. nigrostigma is quite large (roughly 7–8 mm in length). They can be further distinguished from the other species by the presence of three large spines on the fore tibia. The species is sexually dimorphic, with the males coloured black and the females light brown to reddish in colour.

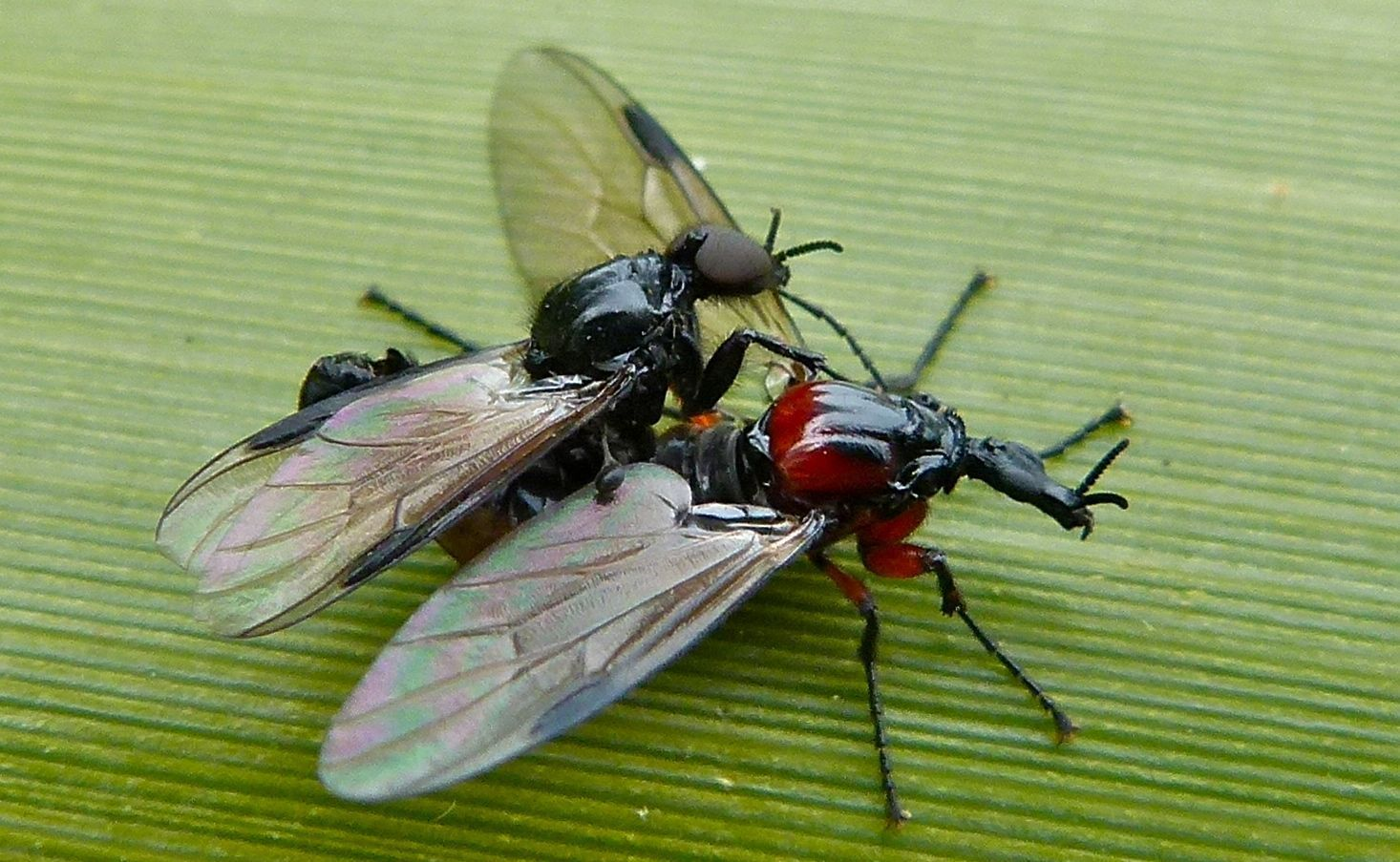
Male (left) and female (right) copulating

== Distribution and habitat ==
The species is only found in New Zealand where it is widespread, occurring on the North Island, South Island, Stewart Island and the Chatham Islands. The adults are most common from November to February.

== Plant associations ==
Dilophus nigrostigma frequently visits a variety of plants, presumably to feed on nectar. Reported plant associations are listed below.

- Carduus nutans
- Cordyline australis
- Kunzea ericoides
- Matthiola incarna
- Carpodetus serratus
- Dracophyllum arboreum
- Leptospermum
- Pterophylla
- Cassinia
- Epilobium
- Nothofagus
- Citrus
- Galium propinquum
- Olearia virgata
- Coprosma
- Hebe
- Rosa
