= Eucinetus strigosus =

Scientific classification
- Kingdom: Animalia
- Phylum: Arthropoda
- Class: Insecta
- Order: Coleoptera
- Suborder: Polyphaga
- Infraorder: Elateriformia
- Family: Eucinetidae
- Genus: Eucinetus
- Species: E. strigosus

Binomial name
- Eucinetus strigosus LeConte, 1875

Species of beetle

Eucinetus strigosus is a species of plate-thigh beetle in the family Eucinetidae. It is found in North America.
