= Euscaphurus saltator =

Scientific classification
- Kingdom: Animalia
- Phylum: Arthropoda
- Class: Insecta
- Order: Coleoptera
- Suborder: Polyphaga
- Infraorder: Elateriformia
- Family: Eucinetidae
- Genus: Euscaphurus
- Species: E. saltator

Binomial name
- Euscaphurus saltator Casey, 1885

Species of beetle

Euscaphurus saltator is a species of plate-thigh beetle in the family Eucinetidae. It is found in North America.
