= Nycteus testaceus =

Scientific classification
- Domain: Eukaryota
- Kingdom: Animalia
- Phylum: Arthropoda
- Class: Insecta
- Order: Coleoptera
- Suborder: Polyphaga
- Infraorder: Elateriformia
- Family: Eucinetidae
- Genus: Nycteus
- Species: N. testaceus

Binomial name
- Nycteus testaceus (LeConte, 1866)

Synonyms
- Eucinetus testaceus LeConte, 1866

Species of beetle

Nycteus testaceus is a species of plate-thigh beetle in the family Eucinetidae. It is found in North America.
