= Pselaphaulax =

Scientific classification
- Kingdom: Animalia
- Phylum: Arthropoda
- Clade: Pancrustacea
- Class: Insecta
- Order: Coleoptera
- Suborder: Polyphaga
- Infraorder: Staphyliniformia
- Family: Staphylinidae
- Subfamily: Pselaphinae
- Supertribe: Pselaphitae
- Tribe: Pselaphini
- Genus: Pselaphaulax; Reitter, 1909

Genus of beetles

Pselaphaulax is a genus of beetles belonging to the family Staphylinidae.

The species of this genus are found in Europe and Australia.

Species:

- Pselaphaulax antipodum (Westwood, 1856)
- Pselaphaulax articularis (Schaufuss, 1877)
