= Arhytodini =

Scientific classification
- Kingdom: Animalia
- Phylum: Arthropoda
- Clade: Pancrustacea
- Class: Insecta
- Order: Coleoptera
- Suborder: Polyphaga
- Infraorder: Staphyliniformia
- Family: Staphylinidae
- Subfamily: Pselaphinae
- Supertribe: Pselaphitae
- Tribe: Arhytodini; Raffray, 1890

Arhytodini is a tribe of rove beetles in the supertribe Pselaphitae. It was first described by Raffray in 1890. It contains 72 accepted species split between 15 genera. Recorded observations have primarily been made in French Guiana, Panama, the United States, and Mexico.

== Genera ==
- Caccoplectinus
- Caccoplectus
- Eichiella
- Holozodoides
- Holozodus
- Madabaxyris
- Pachacuti
- Penarhytus
- Rhytus
- Sabarhytus
- Tetraglyptinus
- Tetraglyptus
- Tolga
- Woldenka
