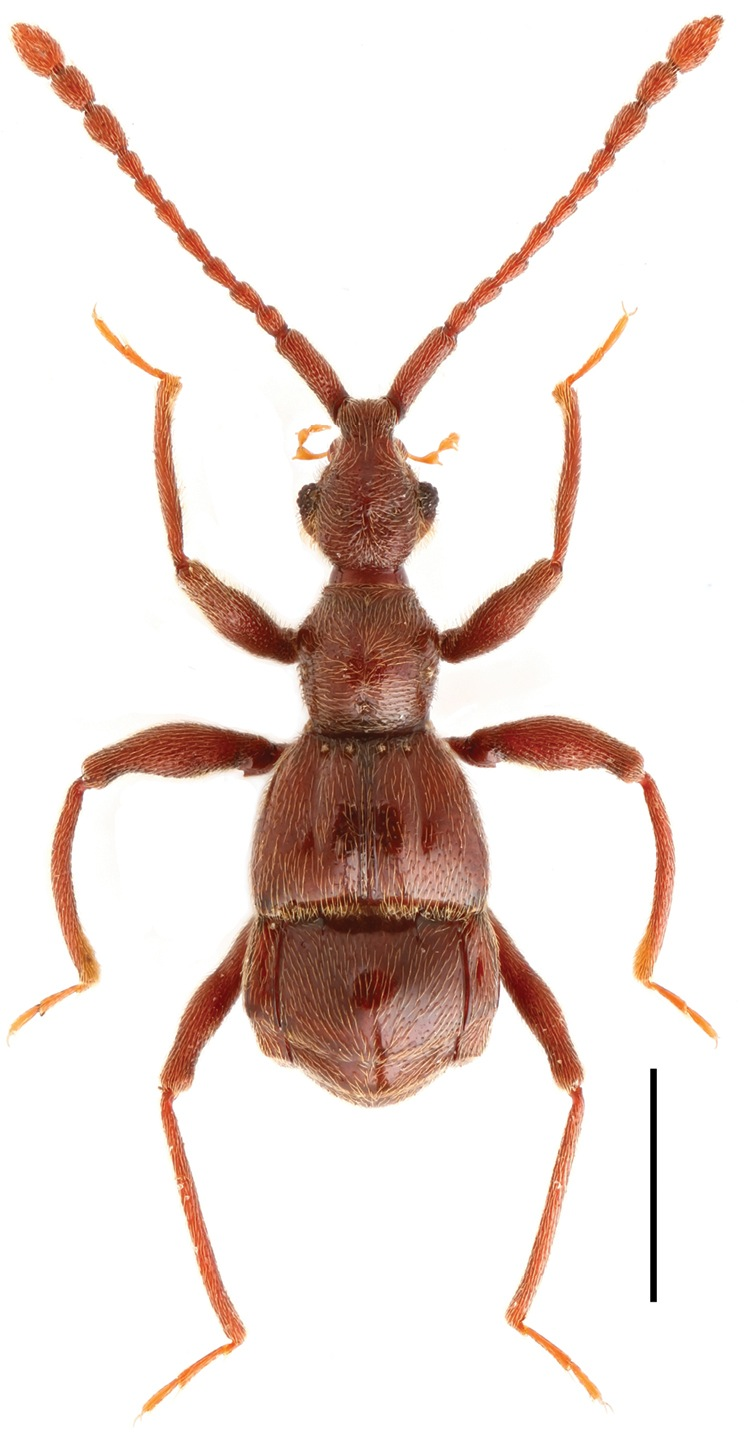
- Dayao emeiensis

Scientific classification
- Kingdom: Animalia
- Phylum: Arthropoda
- Class: Insecta
- Order: Coleoptera
- Suborder: Polyphaga
- Infraorder: Staphyliniformia
- Family: Staphylinidae
- Subfamily: Pselaphinae
- Supertribe: Pselaphitae
- Tribe: Tyrini
- Subtribe: Tyrina
- Genus: Dayao; Yin, Li & Zhao, 2011

= Dayao (beetle) =

Genus of beetles

Dayao is a genus of rove beetles.

== Species ==
- Dayao emeiensis Yin & Li in Yin, Hlavac and Li, 2013
- Dayao pengzhongi Yin, Li & Zhao, 2011
