= Nycteus punctulatus =

Scientific classification
- Kingdom: Animalia
- Phylum: Arthropoda
- Class: Insecta
- Order: Coleoptera
- Suborder: Polyphaga
- Infraorder: Elateriformia
- Family: Eucinetidae
- Genus: Nycteus
- Species: N. punctulatus

Binomial name
- Nycteus punctulatus (LeConte, 1875)

Synonyms
- Eucinetus punctulatus LeConte, 1875

Species of beetle

Nycteus punctulatus is a species of plate-thigh beetle in the family Eucinetidae. It is found in North America.
