= Bisaya =

Bisaya may refer to:

- Bisaya people, a.k.a. Visayans, a Philippine ethnolinguistic group
- Bisaya (Borneo), an ethnic group in Borneo
- Bisayan languages, or Visayan languages, a subgroup of the Austronesian languages spoken in the Philippines
  - Cebuano language, a language spoken in the southern Philippines: natively, though informally, called "Bisaya"
- Brunei Bisaya language, also known as Southern Bisaya, a language spoken in Brunei and Sarawak, Malaysia
- Bisaya Magasin, a weekly Cebuano magazine
- Bisaya (beetle), a genus native to Iran
