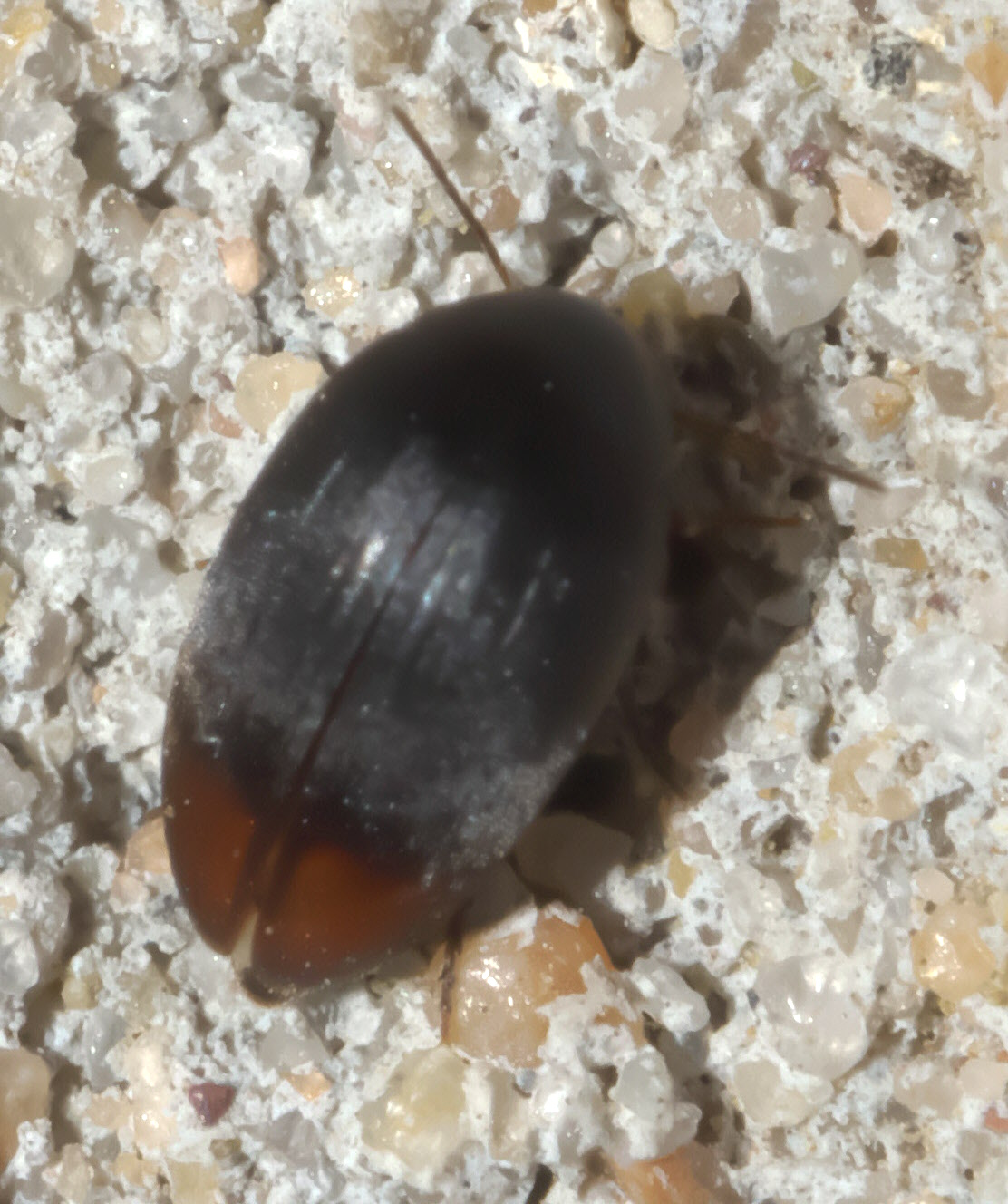

Scientific classification
- Domain: Eukaryota
- Kingdom: Animalia
- Phylum: Arthropoda
- Class: Insecta
- Order: Coleoptera
- Suborder: Polyphaga
- Infraorder: Elateriformia
- Family: Eucinetidae
- Genus: Eucinetus
- Species: E. haemorrhoidalis

Binomial name
- Eucinetus haemorrhoidalis (Germar, 1818)

Synonyms
- Eucinetus terminalis Leconte, 1853

= Eucinetus haemorrhoidalis =

Species of beetle

Eucinetus haemorrhoidalis is a species of plate-thigh beetle in the family Eucinetidae; it is holarctic in distribution, including the North American populations formerly known as Eucinetus terminalis.

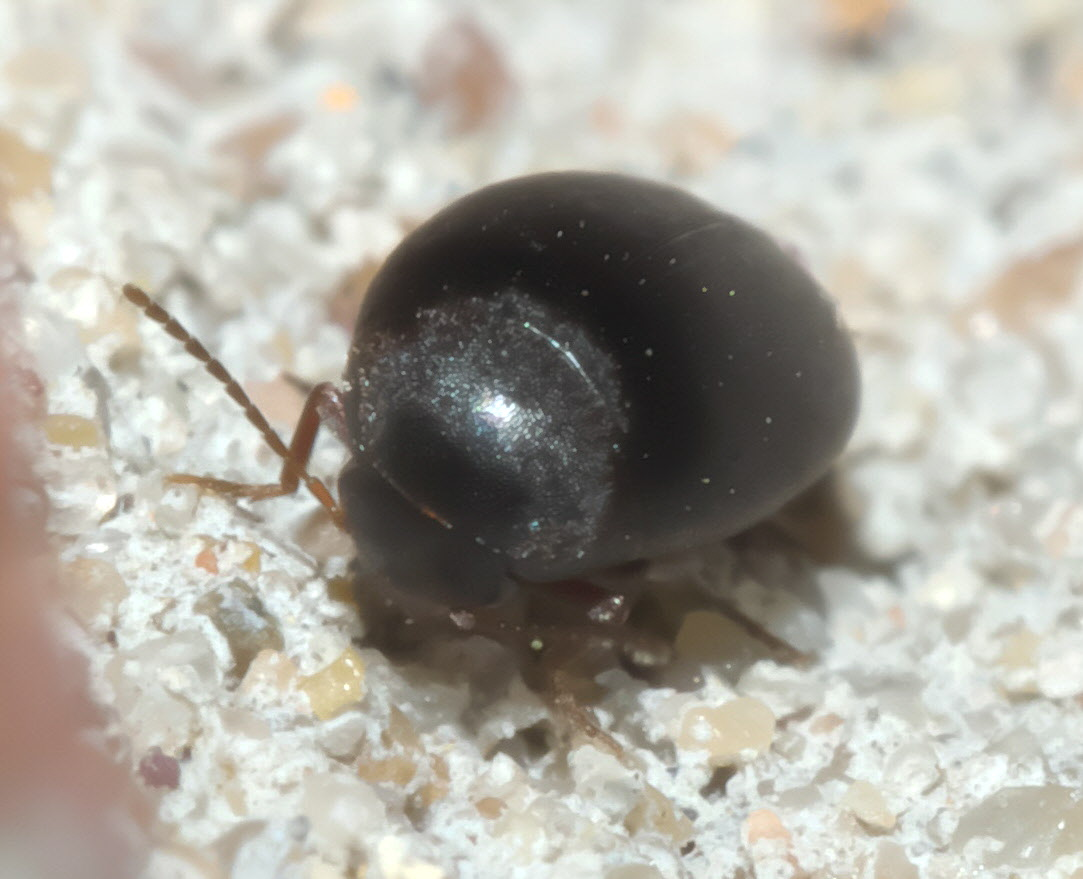
