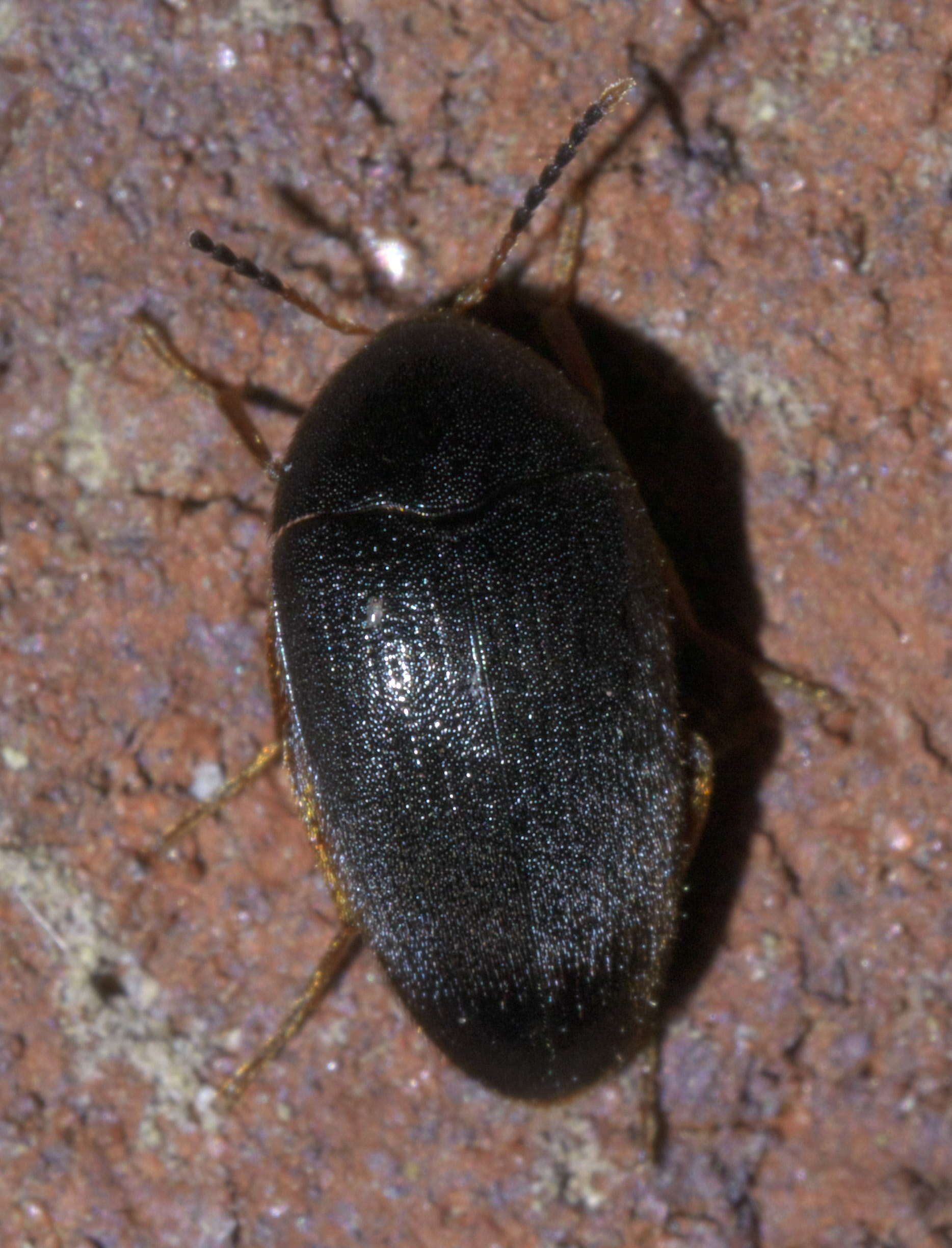

Scientific classification
- Domain: Eukaryota
- Kingdom: Animalia
- Phylum: Arthropoda
- Class: Insecta
- Order: Coleoptera
- Suborder: Polyphaga
- Infraorder: Elateriformia
- Family: Eucinetidae
- Genus: Eucinetus
- Species: E. morio

Binomial name
- Eucinetus morio LeConte, 1853

= Eucinetus morio =

Species of beetle

Eucinetus morio is a species of plate-thigh beetle in the family Eucinetidae. It is found in North America.
