= Saltisedes =

Scientific classification
- Kingdom: Animalia
- Phylum: Arthropoda
- Class: Insecta
- Order: Coleoptera
- Suborder: Polyphaga
- Infraorder: Staphyliniformia
- Family: Staphylinidae
- Subfamily: Pselaphinae
- Supertribe: Pselaphitae
- Tribe: Tmesiphorini
- Genus: Saltisedes; Kubota, 1944

Synonyms
- Stethotaphrus Newton & Chandler, 1989

Genus of beetles

Saltisedes is a genus of rove beetles.

== Species ==
- Saltisedes brunneus Kubota, 1944
- Saltisedes clavatus (Raffray, 1882)
- Saltisedes hainanensis Yin & Nomura in Yin, Nomura, Chandler & Li, 2013
- Saltisedes hamotoides (Schaufuss, 1882)
- Saltisedes javanicus (Raffray, 1882)
- Saltisedes kojimai Nomura & Yin in Yin, Nomura, Chandler & Li, 2013
- Saltisedes longispina (Raffray, 1903)
- Saltisedes weiri (Chandler, 2001)
- Saltisedes yahiroi Nomura & Yin in Yin, Nomura, Chandler & Li, 2013
