= Tyrina =

Scientific classification
- Kingdom: Animalia
- Phylum: Arthropoda
- Class: Insecta
- Order: Coleoptera
- Suborder: Polyphaga
- Infraorder: Staphyliniformia
- Family: Staphylinidae
- Supertribe: Pselaphitae
- Tribe: Tyrini
- Subtribe: Tyrina; Reitter, 1882

Subtribe of beetles

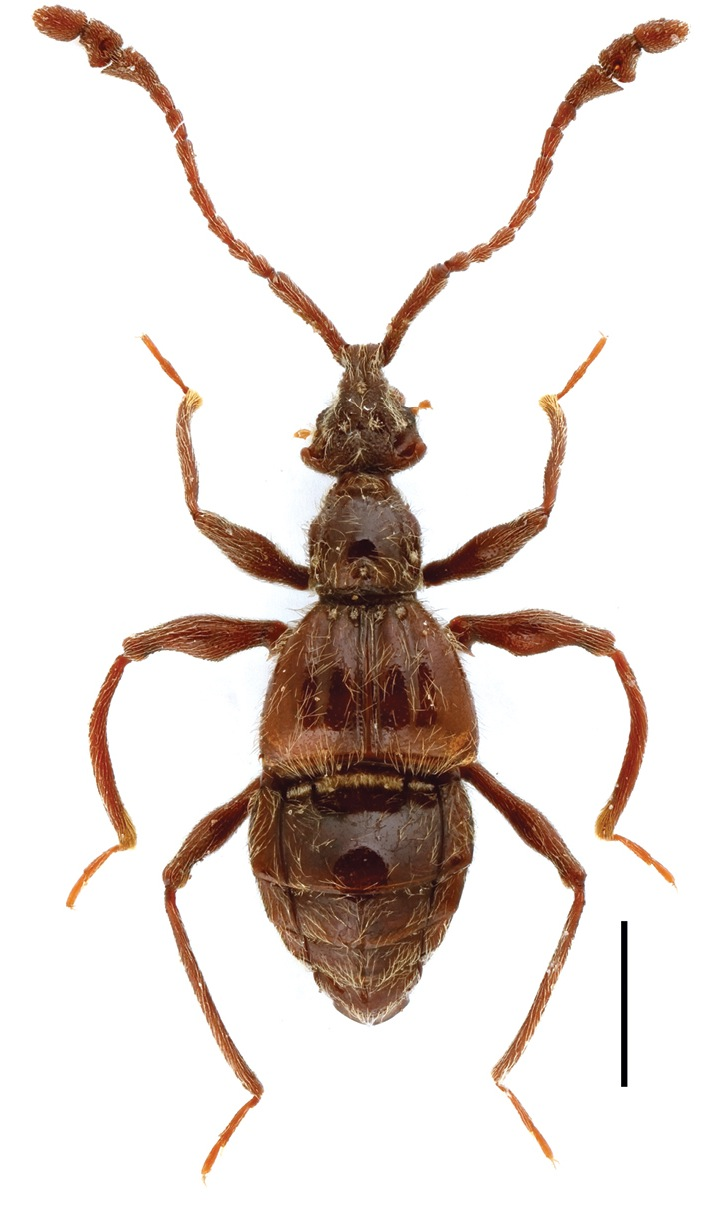

Tyrina is a subtribe of rove beetles.

== Genera ==
- Abascantodes
- Agatyrus
- Anagonus
- Anitra
- Caledonogonus
- Cedius
- Chalcoplectus
- Chasoke
- Collacerothorax
- Dayao
- Durbos
- Gerallus
- Hamotulus
- Kiera
- Labomimus
- Linan
- Megatyrus
- Mipselytrus
- Narrabeen
- Pakistatyrus
- Palimbolus
- Paranagonus
- Phormiobius
- Plesiotyrus
- Pselaphodes
- Rytus
- Spilorhombus
- Taiwanophodes
- Tasmanityrus
- Tyromacrus
- Tyrogetus
- Tyromorphus
- Tyrus
- Vadoniotus
- Zeatyrus
