= Nycteus falsus =

Scientific classification
- Domain: Eukaryota
- Kingdom: Animalia
- Phylum: Arthropoda
- Class: Insecta
- Order: Coleoptera
- Suborder: Polyphaga
- Infraorder: Elateriformia
- Family: Eucinetidae
- Genus: Nycteus
- Species: N. falsus

Binomial name
- Nycteus falsus Vit, 1999

Species of beetle

Nycteus falsus is a species of plate-thigh beetle in the family Eucinetidae. It is found in Central America and North America.
