= Schistodactylini =

Scientific classification
- Kingdom: Animalia
- Phylum: Arthropoda
- Clade: Pancrustacea
- Class: Insecta
- Order: Coleoptera
- Suborder: Polyphaga
- Infraorder: Staphyliniformia
- Family: Staphylinidae
- Supertribe: Pselaphitae
- Tribe: Schistodactylini; Raffray, 1890

Schistodactylini is a tribe of rove beetles in the supertribe Pselaphitae. It was first described by Raffray in 1890. It contains 2 genera with 6 species. Data regarding recorded observations is limited, although to date, all observations of members of Schistodactylini have been made in Australia.

== Genera and species ==
- Leanymus
  - Leanymus mirus
  - Leanymus palpalis
- Schistodactylus
  - Schistodactylus brevipennis
  - Schistodactylus foveiventris
  - Schistodactylus gracilis
  - Schistodactylus phantasma
