= Yanghua, Liuyang =

Rural township in Hunan, China

Coordinates: 27°58′45″N 113°39′32″E

Yanghua Township (simplified Chinese: 杨花乡; traditional Chinese: 楊花鄉; pinyin: Yanghua Xiang) is a rural township in Liuyang City, Changsha City, Hunan Province, People's Republic of China. Yanghua merged to Dayao town on November 18, 2015.

== Cityscape ==
The township is divided into 9 villages, the following areas: Yanghua Village, Duanli Village, Huayuan Village, Shandou Village, Dashan Village, Guange Village, Huanggangchong Village, Yingxin Village, and Laogui Village (杨花村、端里村、华园村、山斗村、大山村、观阁村、黄岗冲村、迎新村、老桂村).
