= Cedius spinosus =

Scientific classification
- Kingdom: Animalia
- Phylum: Arthropoda
- Clade: Pancrustacea
- Class: Insecta
- Order: Coleoptera
- Suborder: Polyphaga
- Infraorder: Staphyliniformia
- Family: Staphylinidae
- Genus: Cedius
- Species: C. spinosus

Binomial name
- Cedius spinosus LeConte, 1849

Synonyms
- Cedius obsoletus Park, 1949

Species of beetle

Cedius spinosus is a species of ant-loving beetle in the family Staphylinidae. It is found in the United States.
