= Dilophus occipitalis =

Scientific classification
- Domain: Eukaryota
- Kingdom: Animalia
- Phylum: Arthropoda
- Class: Insecta
- Order: Diptera
- Family: Bibionidae
- Genus: Dilophus
- Species: D. occipitalis

Binomial name
- Dilophus occipitalis Coquillett, 1904

Synonyms
- Philia oklahomensis Hardy, 1937

Species of fly

Dilophus occipitalis is a species of March fly in the family Bibionidae.
