= Dilophus serotinus =

Scientific classification
- Domain: Eukaryota
- Kingdom: Animalia
- Phylum: Arthropoda
- Class: Insecta
- Order: Diptera
- Family: Bibionidae
- Genus: Dilophus
- Species: D. serotinus

Binomial name
- Dilophus serotinus Loew, 1861

Species of fly

Dilophus serotinus is a species of March fly in the family Bibionidae.
