= Euscaphurus =

Scientific classification
- Kingdom: Animalia
- Phylum: Arthropoda
- Class: Insecta
- Order: Coleoptera
- Suborder: Polyphaga
- Infraorder: Elateriformia
- Family: Eucinetidae
- Genus: Euscaphurus; Casey, 1885

Genus of beetles

Euscaphurus is a genus of plate-thigh beetles in the family Eucinetidae. There are at least three described species in Euscaphurus.

== Species ==
These three species belong to the genus Euscaphurus:

- Euscaphurus nikkon Vít, 1977
- Euscaphurus saltator Casey, 1885
- Euscaphurus spinipes Vit, 1995
