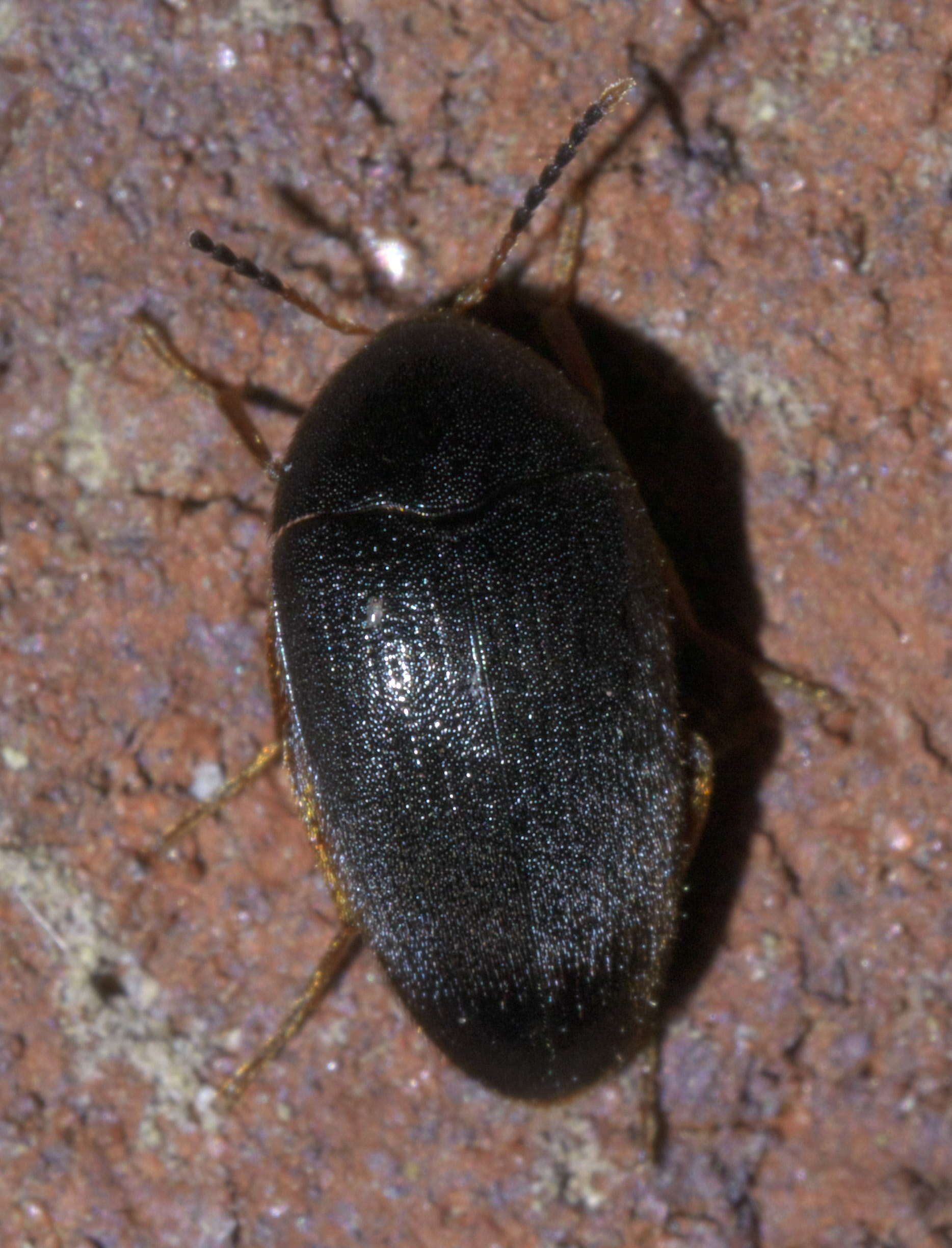
- Eucinetus morio

Scientific classification
- Domain: Eukaryota
- Kingdom: Animalia
- Phylum: Arthropoda
- Class: Insecta
- Order: Coleoptera
- Suborder: Polyphaga
- Infraorder: Elateriformia
- Family: Eucinetidae
- Genus: Eucinetus; Germar, 1818

= Eucinetus =

Genus of beetles

Eucinetus is a genus of plate-thigh beetles in the family Eucinetidae. There are at least four described species in Eucinetus.

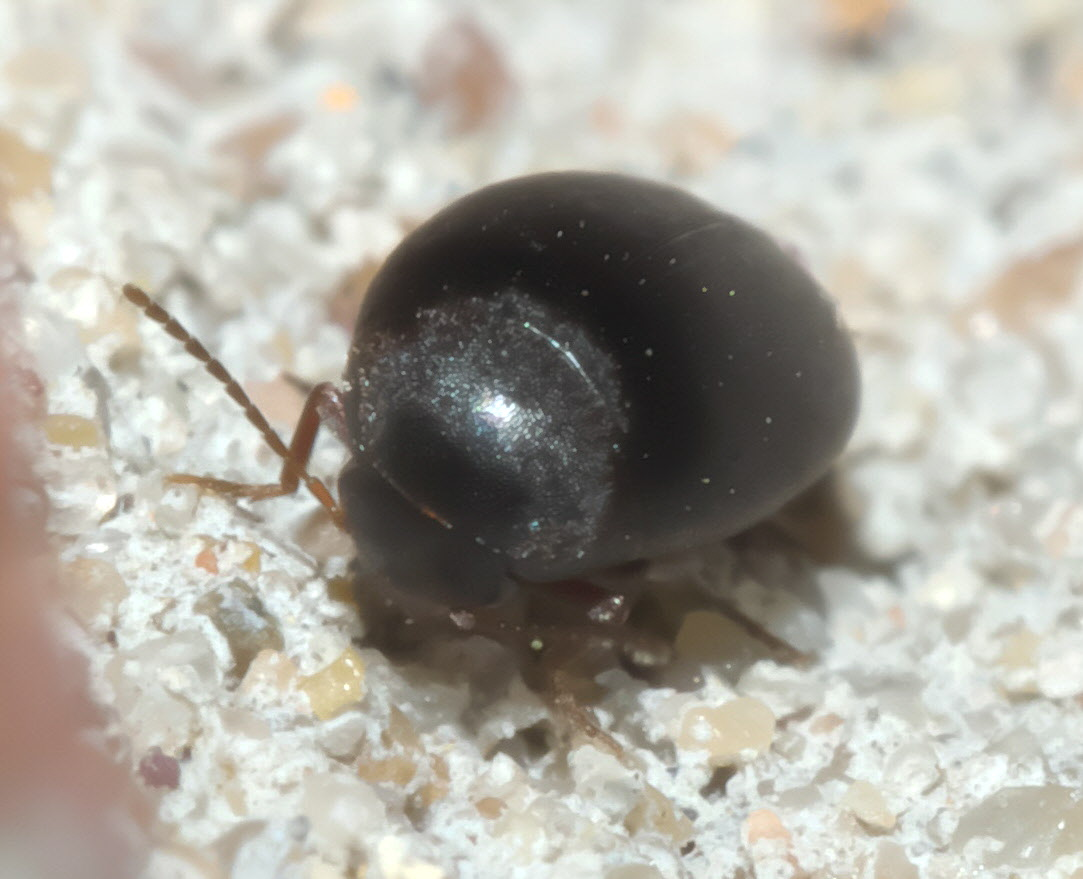
Eucinetus terminalis

== Species ==
These 16 species belong to the genus Eucinetus:

- Eucinetus bicolor Lawrence, 2019
- Eucinetus bicolorellus Lawrence, 2019
- Eucinetus brindabellae Lawrence, 2019
- Eucinetus dorrigo Lawrence, 2019
- Eucinetus haemorrhoidalis (Germar, 1818)^{g b}
- Eucinetus limitaris Lawrence, 2019
- Eucinetus lorien Lawrence, 2019
- Eucinetus minutus Lawrence, 2019
- Eucinetus morio LeConte, 1853^{i c g b}
- Eucinetus nebulosus Lawrence, 2019
- Eucinetus protibialis Lawrence, 2019
- Eucinetus similis Lawrence, 2019
- Eucinetus strigosus LeConte, 1875^{i c g b}
- Eucinetus tasmaniae Lawrence, 2019
- Eucinetus tropicus Lawrence, 2019

Data sources: i = ITIS, c = Catalogue of Life, g = GBIF, b = Bugguide.net
