= Pselaphus bellax =

Scientific classification
- Kingdom: Animalia
- Phylum: Arthropoda
- Class: Insecta
- Order: Coleoptera
- Suborder: Polyphaga
- Infraorder: Staphyliniformia
- Family: Staphylinidae
- Genus: Pselaphus
- Species: P. bellax

Binomial name
- Pselaphus bellax Casey, 1894

Synonyms
- Pselaphus ulkei Bowman, 1934

Species of beetle

Pselaphus bellax is a species of ant-loving beetle in the family Staphylinidae. It is found in North America.
