= Dilophus orbatus =

Scientific classification
- Kingdom: Animalia
- Phylum: Arthropoda
- Class: Insecta
- Order: Diptera
- Family: Bibionidae
- Genus: Dilophus
- Species: D. orbatus

Binomial name
- Dilophus orbatus (Say, 1823)

Synonyms
- Bibio orbatus Say, 1823

Species of fly

Dilophus orbatus is a species of March fly in the family Bibionidae.

Sexual dimorphism in this species can be seen in several forms. Size, with females being longer and males being shorter. Wings, female wings being black and longer while males are transparent. Eyes, with males being far larger, almost appearing conjoined, and taking up a majority of facial space whereas females have smaller eyes.
