= Centrophthalmus elegans =

Scientific classification
- Kingdom: Animalia
- Phylum: Arthropoda
- Class: Insecta
- Order: Coleoptera
- Suborder: Polyphaga
- Infraorder: Staphyliniformia
- Family: Staphylinidae
- Genus: Centrophthalmus
- Species: C. elegans

Binomial name
- Centrophthalmus elegans Raffray, 1912

Species of beetle

Centrophthalmus elegans is a species of rove beetles in the subfamily Pselaphinae. It has a palaearctic distribution.
