= Nycteus (beetle) =

Scientific classification
- Kingdom: Animalia
- Phylum: Arthropoda
- Class: Insecta
- Order: Coleoptera
- Suborder: Polyphaga
- Infraorder: Elateriformia
- Family: Eucinetidae
- Genus: Nycteus; Latreille, 1829

Genus of beetles

Nycteus is a genus of plate-thigh beetles in the family Eucinetidae. There are about 11 described species in Nycteus.

== Species ==
These 11 species belong to the genus Nycteus:

- Nycteus bicolor (Reitter, 1887)^{g}
- Nycteus falsus Vit, 1999^{i c g b}
- Nycteus hopffgarteni (Reitter, 1885)^{g}
- Nycteus infumatus (LeConte, 1853)^{i c g b}
- Nycteus meridionalis Laporte, 1836^{g}
- Nycteus oertzeni (Reitter, 1887)^{g}
- Nycteus oviformis (LeConte, 1866)^{i c g b}
- Nycteus prospector (Vit, 1985)^{g}
- Nycteus punctulatus (LeConte, 1875)^{i c g b}
- Nycteus testaceus (LeConte, 1866)^{i c g b}
- Nycteus wollastoni Vit, 1999^{i c g}

Data sources: i = ITIS, c = Catalogue of Life, g = GBIF, b = Bugguide.net
