= Pselaphus erichsoni =

Scientific classification
- Kingdom: Animalia
- Phylum: Arthropoda
- Class: Insecta
- Order: Coleoptera
- Suborder: Polyphaga
- Infraorder: Staphyliniformia
- Family: Staphylinidae
- Genus: Pselaphus
- Species: P. erichsoni

Binomial name
- Pselaphus erichsoni LeConte, 1840

Species of beetle

Pselaphus erichsoni is a species of ant-loving beetle in the family Staphylinidae. It is found in North America.
