= Ceophyllus =

Scientific classification
- Kingdom: Animalia
- Phylum: Arthropoda
- Class: Insecta
- Order: Coleoptera
- Suborder: Polyphaga
- Infraorder: Staphyliniformia
- Family: Staphylinidae
- Supertribe: Pselaphitae
- Genus: Ceophyllus; LeConte, 1849

Genus of beetles

Ceophyllus is a genus of ant-loving beetles in the family Staphylinidae. There is one described species in Ceophyllus, C. monilis.
