= Dilophus tingi =

Scientific classification
- Domain: Eukaryota
- Kingdom: Animalia
- Phylum: Arthropoda
- Class: Insecta
- Order: Diptera
- Family: Bibionidae
- Genus: Dilophus
- Species: D. tingi

Binomial name
- Dilophus tingi (Hardy, 1942)

Synonyms
- Philia tingi Hardy, 1942

Species of fly

Dilophus tingi is a species of March fly in the family Bibionidae.
