= Euscaphurus spinipes =

Scientific classification
- Domain: Eukaryota
- Kingdom: Animalia
- Phylum: Arthropoda
- Class: Insecta
- Order: Coleoptera
- Suborder: Polyphaga
- Infraorder: Elateriformia
- Family: Eucinetidae
- Genus: Euscaphurus
- Species: E. spinipes

Binomial name
- Euscaphurus spinipes Vit, 1995

Species of beetle

Euscaphurus spinipes is a species of plate-thigh beetle in the family Eucinetidae. It is found in North America.
