= Hybocephalini =

Scientific classification
- Kingdom: Animalia
- Phylum: Arthropoda
- Clade: Pancrustacea
- Class: Insecta
- Order: Coleoptera
- Suborder: Polyphaga
- Infraorder: Staphyliniformia
- Family: Staphylinidae
- Subfamily: Pselaphinae
- Supertribe: Pselaphitae
- Tribe: Hybocephalini; Raffray, 1890

Tribe of beetles

Hybocephalini is a tribe of rove beetles in the supertribe Pselaphitae. It was first described by Raffray in 1890. It contains 12 genera with 76 species. Recorded observations have primarily been made in Japan and China, with some also being made in South Korea.

== Genera ==
- Acmoeonotus
- Apharinodes
- Europharinodes
- Filigerinus
- Filigerodes
- Hybocephalodes
- Hyocephalus
- Mecochelia
- Mestogaster
- Mestogastridus
- Pseudapharina
- Stipesa
