= Dilophus strigilatus =

Scientific classification
- Domain: Eukaryota
- Kingdom: Animalia
- Phylum: Arthropoda
- Class: Insecta
- Order: Diptera
- Family: Bibionidae
- Genus: Dilophus
- Species: D. strigilatus

Binomial name
- Dilophus strigilatus Mcatee, 1922

Species of fly

Dilophus strigilatus is a species of March fly in the family Bibionidae.
