= Attapsenius =

Scientific classification
- Kingdom: Animalia
- Phylum: Arthropoda
- Clade: Pancrustacea
- Class: Insecta
- Order: Coleoptera
- Suborder: Polyphaga
- Infraorder: Staphyliniformia
- Family: Staphylinidae
- Subfamily: Pselaphinae
- Supertribe: Pselaphitae
- Tribe: Attapseniini; Bruch, 1933
- Genus: Attapsenius; Bruch, 1933

Attapseniini is a tribe of rove beetles in the supertribe Pselaphitae. It was first described by Bruch in 1933. It contains one genus, Attapsenius, with two species, Attapsenius chernosvitovi and Attapsenius eidmanni.
