= Tohlezkus =

Scientific classification
- Domain: Eukaryota
- Kingdom: Animalia
- Phylum: Arthropoda
- Class: Insecta
- Order: Coleoptera
- Suborder: Polyphaga
- Infraorder: Elateriformia
- Family: Eucinetidae
- Genus: Tohlezkus; Vít, 1977

Genus of beetles

Tohlezkus is a genus of plate-thigh beetles in the family Eucinetidae. There are at least three described species in Tohlezkus.

== Species ==
These three species belong to the genus Tohlezkus:

- Tohlezkus inexpectus Vit, 1995
- Tohlezkus orientalis Vit, 1981
- Tohlezkus ponticus Vít, 1977
