= Pselaphini =

Scientific classification
- Kingdom: Animalia
- Phylum: Arthropoda
- Clade: Pancrustacea
- Class: Insecta
- Order: Coleoptera
- Suborder: Polyphaga
- Infraorder: Staphyliniformia
- Family: Staphylinidae
- Subfamily: Pselaphinae
- Supertribe: Pselaphitae
- Tribe: Pselaphini; Latreille, 1802

Tribe of beetles

Pselaphini is a tribe of rove beetles in the supertribe Pselaphitae. It was first described by Latreille in 1802. It contains 30 genera and 453 accepted species.

== Genera ==
- Afropselaphus
- Bellenden
- Curclionellus
- Dicentrius
- Geopselaphus
- Himallaphus
- Hirashimanymus
- Kakadu
- Mareeba
- Maydena
- Mentraphus
- Nabepselaphus
- Neopselaphus
- Nepallaphus
- Peckiella
- Pselaphaulax
- Pselaphellus
- Pselaphischnus
- Pselaphogenius
- Pselaphophus
- Pselaphopluteum
- Pselaphorites
- Pselaphostomus
- Pselaphotheseus
- Pselaphotrichus
- Pselaphotumulus
- Pselaphus
- Taomica
- Tyraphus
