= Tmesiphorus costalis =

Scientific classification
- Kingdom: Animalia
- Phylum: Arthropoda
- Class: Insecta
- Order: Coleoptera
- Suborder: Polyphaga
- Infraorder: Staphyliniformia
- Family: Staphylinidae
- Genus: Tmesiphorus
- Species: T. costalis

Binomial name
- Tmesiphorus costalis LeConte, 1849

Synonyms
- Tmesiphorus costalis rostratus Schaufuss, 1888

Species of beetle

Tmesiphorus costalis is a species of ant-loving beetle in the family Staphylinidae. It is found in North America.
