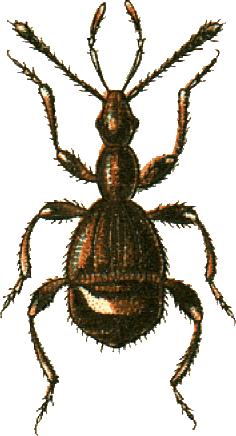
- Pselaphus heisei

Scientific classification
- Kingdom: Animalia
- Phylum: Arthropoda
- Clade: Pancrustacea
- Class: Insecta
- Order: Coleoptera
- Suborder: Polyphaga
- Infraorder: Staphyliniformia
- Family: Staphylinidae
- Subfamily: Pselaphinae
- Supertribe: Pselaphitae
- Tribe: Pselaphini
- Genus: Pselaphus; Herbst, 1792

= Pselaphus =

Genus of beetles

Pselaphus is a genus of ant-loving beetles in the family Staphylinidae. There are at least 20 described species in Pselaphus.

== Species ==
These 20 species belong to the genus Pselaphus:

- Pselaphus acuminatus Motschulsky, 1835
- Pselaphus bellax Casey, 1894
- Pselaphus bulbifer Reichenbach, 1816
- Pselaphus caucasicus Motschulsky, 1845
- Pselaphus erichsoni LeConte, 1840
- Pselaphus fustifer Casey, 1894
- Pselaphus heisei Herbst, 1791
- Pselaphus lomnickii (Reitter, 1901)
- Pselaphus longiclavus LeConte, 1849
- Pselaphus minyops Wollaston, 1871
- Pselaphus mundus Sharp, 1874
- Pselaphus parvus Karaman, 1940
- Pselaphus pauper Sharp, 1874
- Pselaphus salonitanus Karaman, 1940
- Pselaphus securiger Reichenbach, 1816
- Pselaphus skopljensis Karaman
- Pselaphus tenuis Sharp, 1874
- Pselaphus treskanus Karaman
- Pselaphus turkestanicus Karaman
- Pselaphus ventralis Broun, 1895
