= Phalepsus =

Scientific classification
- Kingdom: Animalia
- Phylum: Arthropoda
- Clade: Pancrustacea
- Class: Insecta
- Order: Coleoptera
- Suborder: Polyphaga
- Infraorder: Staphyliniformia
- Family: Staphylinidae
- Subfamily: Pselaphinae
- Supertribe: Pselaphitae
- Tribe: Phalepsini; Jeannel, 1949
- Genus: Phalepsus; Westwood, 1870

Genus of beetles

Phalepsini is a tribe of rove beetles in the supertribe Pselaphitae. It was first described by Jeannel in 1949. It contains one genus, Phalepsus, with 10 species.

== Species ==
- Phalepsus ampliventris
- Phalepsus batesellus
- Phalepsus cavicornis
- Phalepsus fluminicola
- Phalepsus guatemalensis
- Phalepsus marelloides
- Phalepsus nanus
- Phalepsus neotropicus
- Phalepsus subglobosus
- Phalepsus vulgaris
