= Tmesiphorus carinatus =

Scientific classification
- Kingdom: Animalia
- Phylum: Arthropoda
- Class: Insecta
- Order: Coleoptera
- Suborder: Polyphaga
- Infraorder: Staphyliniformia
- Family: Staphylinidae
- Genus: Tmesiphorus
- Species: T. carinatus

Binomial name
- Tmesiphorus carinatus (Say, 1824)

Species of beetle

Tmesiphorus carinatus is a species of ant-loving beetle in the family Staphylinidae. It is found in North America.
