= Pachygastrodini =

Scientific classification
- Kingdom: Animalia
- Phylum: Arthropoda
- Clade: Pancrustacea
- Class: Insecta
- Order: Coleoptera
- Suborder: Polyphaga
- Infraorder: Staphyliniformia
- Family: Staphylinidae
- Subfamily: Pselaphinae
- Supertribe: Pselaphitae
- Tribe: Pachygastrodini; Leleup, 1969

Tribe of beetles

Pachygastrodini is a tribe of rove beetles in the supertribe Pselaphitae. It was first described by Leleup in 1969. It contains 2 genera with 3 species.

== Genera and species ==
- Pachygastrodes
  - Pachygastrodes minimipennis
- Pachygastrodirius
  - Pachygastrodirius descarpentriesi
  - Pachygastrodirius globulicollis
