= Odontalgini =

Scientific classification
- Kingdom: Animalia
- Phylum: Arthropoda
- Clade: Pancrustacea
- Class: Insecta
- Order: Coleoptera
- Suborder: Polyphaga
- Infraorder: Staphyliniformia
- Family: Staphylinidae
- Supertribe: Pselaphitae
- Tribe: Odontalgini; Jeannel, 1949

Odontalgini is a tribe of rove beetles in the supertribe Pselaphitae. It was first described by Jeannel in 1949. It contains 5 genera with 57 species. Recorded observations of members of Odontalgini have been made primarily in Japan, with some also being made in Australia, Kenya, Vietnam, and South Africa.

== Genera ==
- Algodontodes
- Algodontus
- Madontalgus
- Odontalgus
- Warrumbungle
