= Tyrus corticinus =

Scientific classification
- Kingdom: Animalia
- Phylum: Arthropoda
- Class: Insecta
- Order: Coleoptera
- Suborder: Polyphaga
- Infraorder: Staphyliniformia
- Family: Staphylinidae
- Genus: Tyrus
- Species: T. corticinus

Binomial name
- Tyrus corticinus (Casey, 1887)

Synonyms
- Tyrus carinifer Casey, 1897

Species of beetle

Tyrus corticinus is a species of ant-loving beetle in the family Staphylinidae.
