= Caccoplectus =

Scientific classification
- Kingdom: Animalia
- Phylum: Arthropoda
- Class: Insecta
- Order: Coleoptera
- Suborder: Polyphaga
- Infraorder: Staphyliniformia
- Family: Staphylinidae
- Supertribe: Pselaphitae
- Genus: Caccoplectus; Sharp, 1887

Genus of beetles

Caccoplectus is a genus of ant-loving beetles in the family Staphylinidae. There are about nine described species in Caccoplectus.

== Species ==
These nine species belong to the genus Caccoplectus:

- Caccoplectus conicus Chandler & Wolda, 1986
- Caccoplectus degallieri Chandler & Wolda, 1986
- Caccoplectus lucidus Chandler & Wolda, 1986
- Caccoplectus nuttingi Chandler, 1976
- Caccoplectus pectinatus Chandler, 1976
- Caccoplectus schwarzi Chandler & Wolda
- Caccoplectus sentis Chandler, 1976
- Caccoplectus spinipes Schaeffer, 1906 (spine-legged pselaphid)
- Caccoplectus sucineas
