= Dayao, Liuyang =

Dayao Town 大瑶镇
- Town
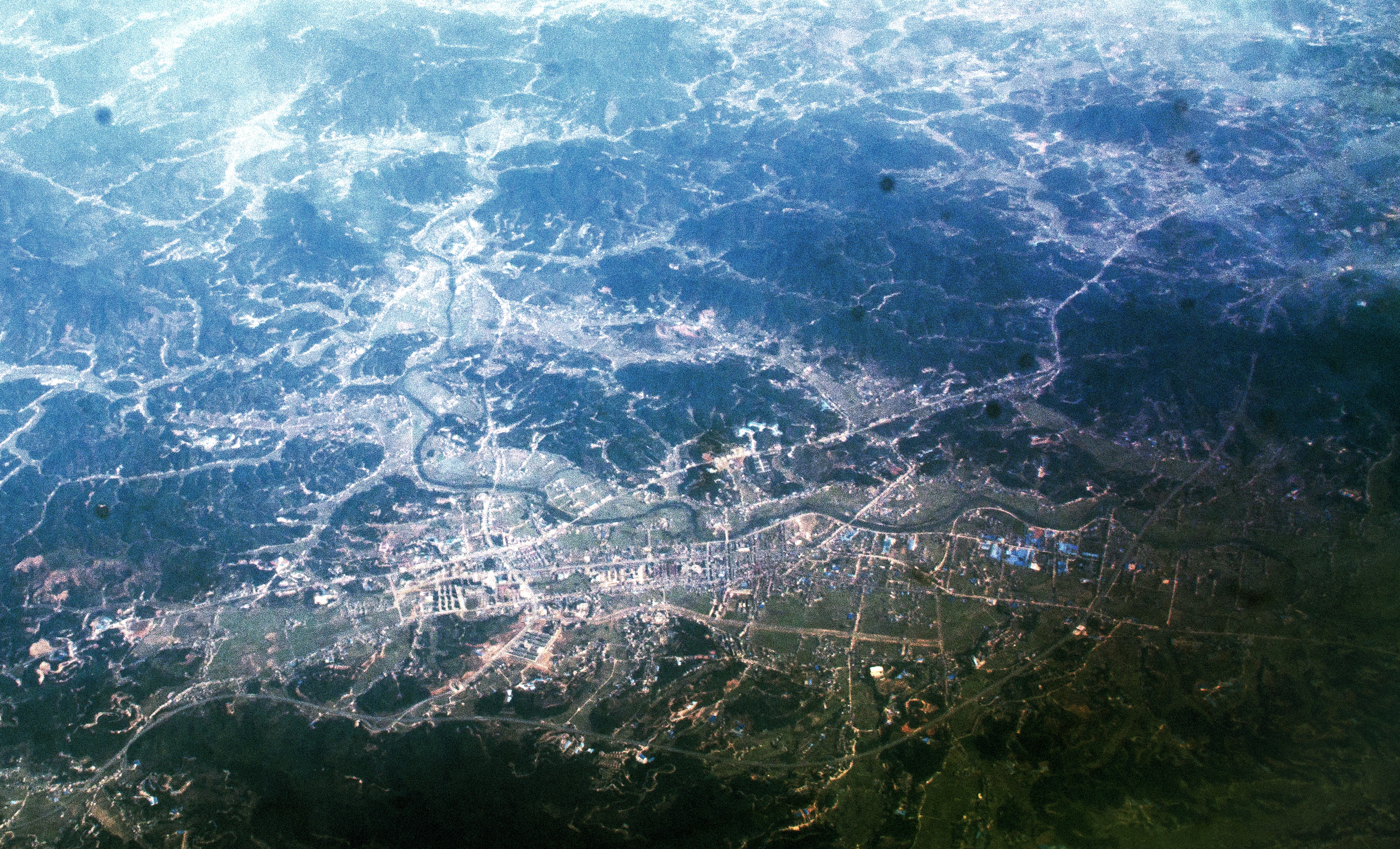
- Dayao from above

- Location in Hunan
- Coordinates: 27°58′30″N 113°43′24″E
- Country: People's Republic of China
- Province: Hunan
- Prefecture-level city: Changsha
- County-level city: Liuyang

Area
  - Total: 149.3 km^{2} (57.6 sq mi)

Population (2015)
  - Total: 91,300
  - Density: 612/km^{2} (1,580/sq mi)
- Time zone: UTC+8 (China Standard)
- Postal code: 410312
- Area code: 0731

Dayao (simplified Chinese: 大瑶镇; traditional Chinese: 大瑤鎮; pinyin: Dàyáo Zhèn) is a rural town under the administration of and in the south of Liuyang, Hunan, China. Dayao is well known for its firework industry. Dayao has an area of 149.3 square kilometres (57.6 sq mi). and a population of 91,300. Yanghua Township merged to Dayao on November 18, 2015. The town is bordered to the north by Hehua Subdistrict, to the east by Chengtanjiang Town, to the south by the towns of Jingang and Litian, and to the west by Chengchong Town.

== History ==
Dayao was incorporated as a township in 1956.

It was upgraded to a town in 1995.

Yanghua Township merged to Dayao on November 18, 2015.

On 14 October 2016, the town was listed among the first group of "Distinctive Towns in China" by the National Development and Reform Commission, Ministry of Finance and Ministry of Housing and Urban-Rural Development.

== Administrative divisions ==
The town is divided into 11 villages and four communities, which include the following areas:

- Nanchuan Community (南川社区)
- Chongwen Community (崇文社区)
- Tianhe Community (天和社区)
- Huifeng Community (汇丰社区)
- Shangsheng Village (上升村)
- Nanshan Village (南山村)
- Nanyang Village (南阳村)
- Litian Village (李畋村)
- Fenglin Village (枫林村)
- Qaingsheng Village (强盛村)
- Laogui New Village (老桂新村)
- Xinhe Village (鑫和村)
- Duanli Village (端里村)
- Huayuan Village (华园村)
- Yanghua Village (杨花村)

== Geography ==
Nanchuan River (南川河) flows through the town.

Mountains located adjacent to and visible from the townsite are: Mount Jiuhua (九华山) and Mount Xianglujian (香炉尖; 477 metres (1,565 ft)).

There are two reservoirs in the Dayao Irrigation District: Tuanjie Reservoir (团结水库) and Tianzi Reservoir (天子水库).

== Economy ==
The town's main industries are fireworks, building materials, ceramics and machinery manufacture.

== Education ==
- Dayao Middle School
- Liuyang No. 2 High School

== Hospital ==
- Liuyang No. 6 Hospital

== Transportation ==
=== Expressway ===
The Changsha–Liuyang Expressway, from Changsha, running north to south through the town to Jiangxi.

=== National Highway ===
The town is connected to two National highways: G319 and G106.

=== Provincial Highway ===
The Provincial Highway S310 passes across the town west to east.

=== County Roads ===
The town has three county roads: Daqing County Road, Dayang County Road and Yangda County Road.

== Religion ==
Qiuxiangu Temple (邱仙姑庙), Sanyuan Palace (三元宫), Temple of the God of Wealth (财神庙) and Shejun Temple (社君庙) are Taoist temples in the town.

Jinshushan Temple (金树山寺) is a Buddhist temple in the town.

== Attractions ==
The main attractions are the Grand House of Qiu Family, Former Residence of Li Tian and Li Tian Park.

There are a number of popular mountains located immediately adjacent to the townsite which include Mount Lion (狮子岩), Mount Jiuhua (九华山) and Mount Yuntai (云台山).

== Notable people ==
- Li Tian (李畋), the inventor of fireworks
- Zhang Shaoxiu (张绍修), physician
- Ouyang Shouting (欧阳寿廷), Xiang opera performer
- Wang Zhengquan (王正权), educator
- Wang Renmei, actress
- Wang Renyi (王人艺), musician
- Deng Gongwei (邓公卫), revolutionary martyr
