= Cedius =

Scientific classification
- Kingdom: Animalia
- Phylum: Arthropoda
- Clade: Pancrustacea
- Class: Insecta
- Order: Coleoptera
- Suborder: Polyphaga
- Infraorder: Staphyliniformia
- Family: Staphylinidae
- Subtribe: Tyrina
- Genus: Cedius; LeConte, 1849

Genus of beetles

Cedius is a genus of ant-loving beetles in the family Staphylinidae. They occur in eastern North America.

== Species ==
There are three recognized species in Cedius:

- Cedius cruralis Park, 1949
- Cedius spinosus LeConte, 1849
- Cedius ziegleri LeConte, 1849
