= Tmesiphorus =

Scientific classification
- Kingdom: Animalia
- Phylum: Arthropoda
- Class: Insecta
- Order: Coleoptera
- Suborder: Polyphaga
- Infraorder: Staphyliniformia
- Family: Staphylinidae
- Supertribe: Pselaphitae
- Genus: Tmesiphorus; LeConte, 1849

Synonyms
- Sintectes Westwood, 1870

Genus of beetles

Tmesiphorus is a genus of ant-loving beetles in the family Staphylinidae. There are about eight described species in Tmesiphorus.

== Species ==
These eight species belong to the genus Tmesiphorus:

- Sintectes carinatus Westwood, 1870
- Tmesiphorus andrewesi Jeannel, 1960
- Tmesiphorus brevipennis Jeannel, 1960
- Tmesiphorus carinatus (Say, 1824)
- Tmesiphorus championi Jeannel, 1960
- Tmesiphorus costalis LeConte, 1849
- Tmesiphorus iyeri Jeannel, 1960
- Tmesiphorus kinomurai Inoue et al., 2019
- Tmesiphorus nitens Jeannel, 1960
- Tmesiphorus okinawensis Inoue et al., 2019
