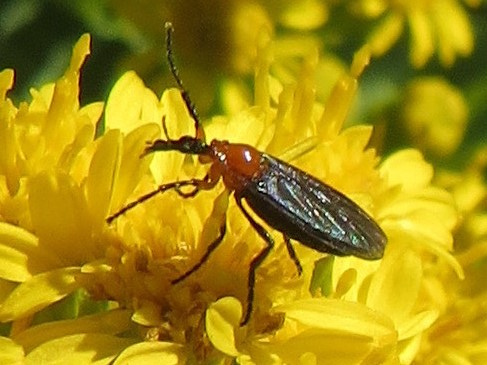

Scientific classification
- Domain: Eukaryota
- Kingdom: Animalia
- Phylum: Arthropoda
- Class: Insecta
- Order: Diptera
- Family: Bibionidae
- Genus: Dilophus
- Species: D. spinipes

Binomial name
- Dilophus spinipes Say, 1823

Synonyms
- Dilophus dimidiatus Loew, 1869; Dilophus thoracicus Say, 1823; Plecia bimaculata Walker, 1856

= Dilophus spinipes =

Species of fly

Dilophus spinipes is a species of March fly in the family Bibionidae.
