= Caccoplectus spinipes =

Scientific classification
- Kingdom: Animalia
- Phylum: Arthropoda
- Class: Insecta
- Order: Coleoptera
- Suborder: Polyphaga
- Infraorder: Staphyliniformia
- Family: Staphylinidae
- Genus: Caccoplectus
- Species: C. spinipes

Binomial name
- Caccoplectus spinipes Schaeffer, 1906

Species of beetle

Caccoplectus spinipes, the spine-legged pselaphid, is a species of ant-loving beetle in the family Staphylinidae. It is found in Central America and North America.
