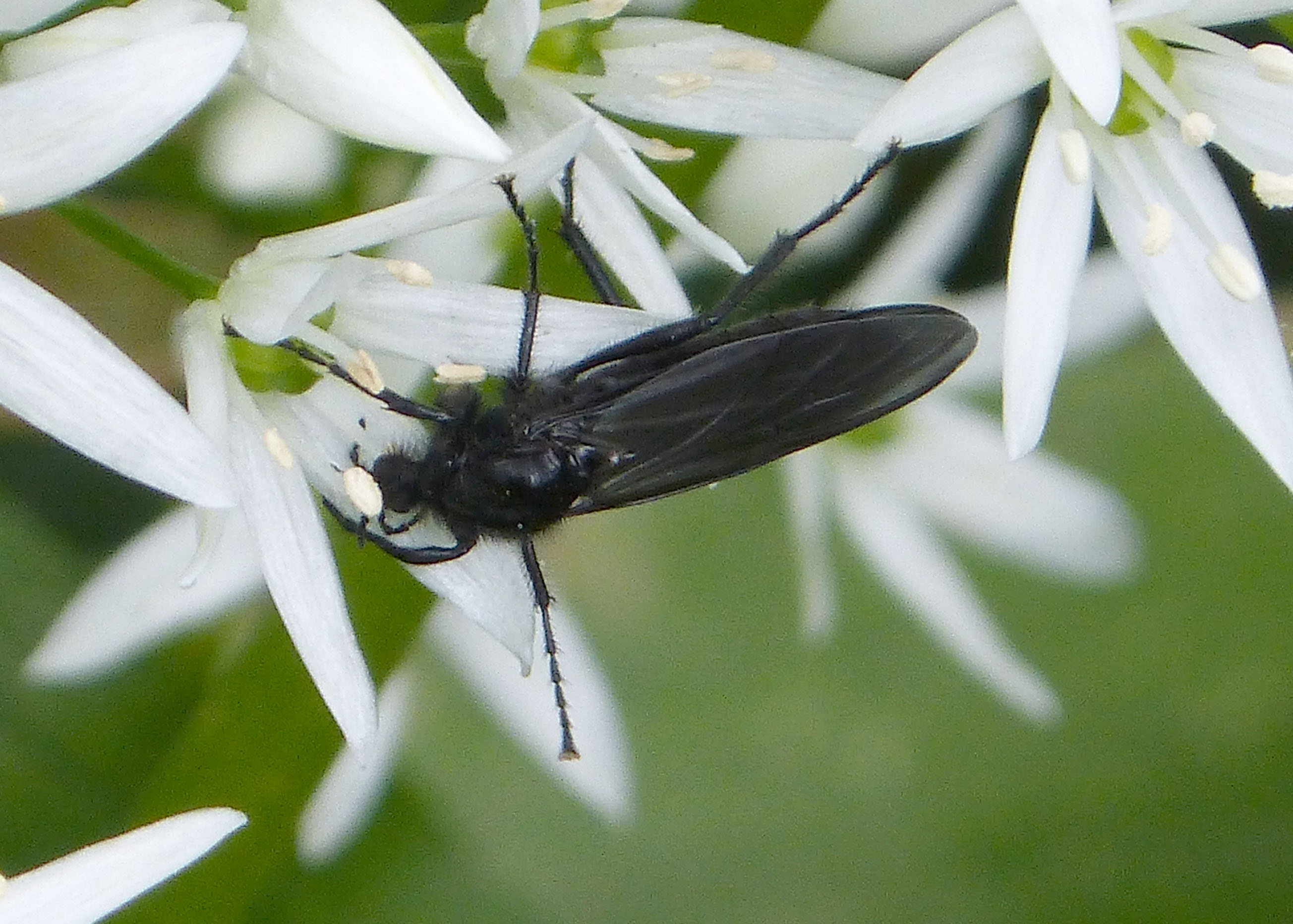

Scientific classification
- Kingdom: Animalia
- Phylum: Arthropoda
- Class: Insecta
- Order: Diptera
- Family: Bibionidae
- Genus: Dilophus
- Species: D. febrilis

Binomial name
- Dilophus febrilis (Linnaeus, 1758)

= Dilophus febrilis =

Species of fly

Dilophus febrilis is a species of fever fly in the family Bibionidae. It is found in the Palearctic.
