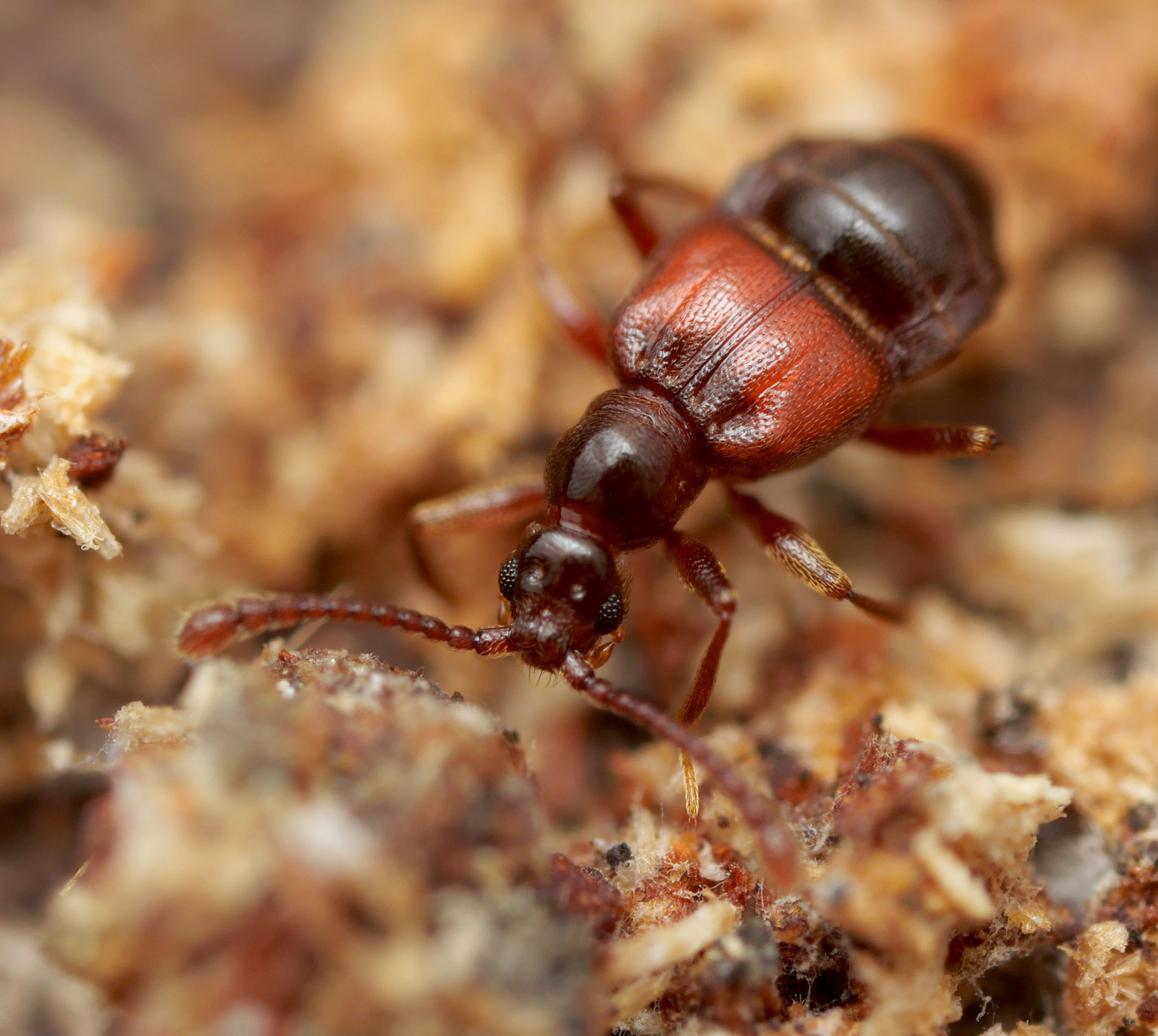
- Tyrus mucronatus

Scientific classification
- Kingdom: Animalia
- Phylum: Arthropoda
- Class: Insecta
- Order: Coleoptera
- Suborder: Polyphaga
- Infraorder: Staphyliniformia
- Family: Staphylinidae
- Subtribe: Tyrina
- Genus: Tyrus; Aubé, 1833

Synonyms
- Pseudotyrus Raffray, 1890; Pytna Casey, 1887

= Tyrus (beetle) =

Genus of beetles

Tyrus is a genus of ant-loving beetles in the family Staphylinidae. There are about five described species in Tyrus.

== Species ==
These five species belong to the genus Tyrus:

- Tyrus corticinus (Casey, 1887)^{i c b}
- Tyrus humeralis (Aubé, 1844)^{i c g}
- Tyrus mucronatus (Panzer, 1803)^{g}
- Tyrus peyroni Saulcy, 1874^{g}
- Tyrus semiruber Casey, 1897^{i c g b}

Data sources: i = ITIS, c = Catalogue of Life, g = GBIF, b = Bugguide.net
