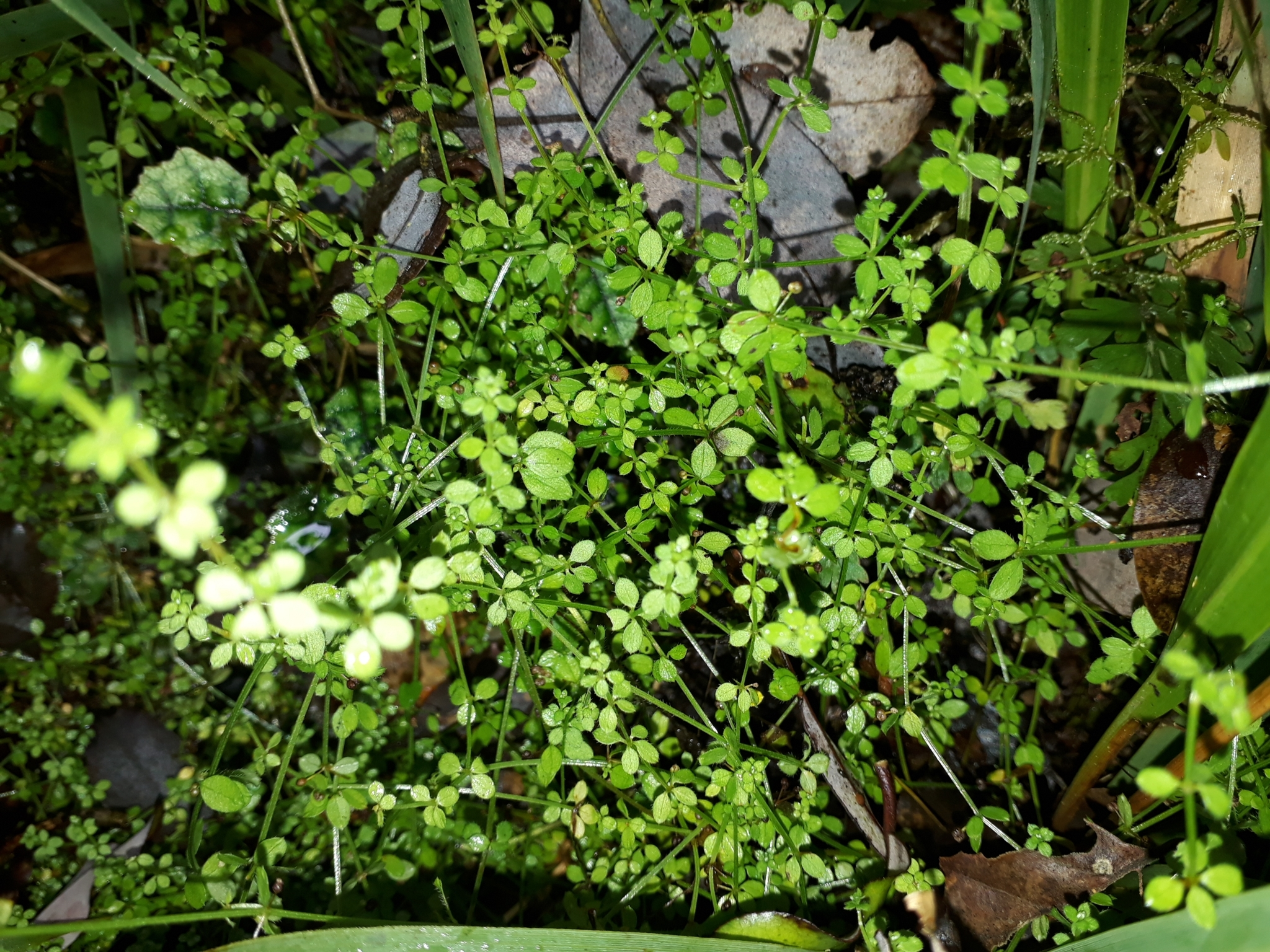

Scientific classification
- Kingdom: Plantae
- Clade: Tracheophytes
- Clade: Angiosperms
- Clade: Eudicots
- Clade: Asterids
- Order: Gentianales
- Family: Rubiaceae
- Genus: Galium
- Species: G. propinquum

Binomial name
- Galium propinquum Cunningham

= Galium propinquum =

Species of plant

Galium propinquum is a species of plant in the family Rubiaceae.

It is native to New Zealand and East and South East Australia.
