= Bisaya nossidiiformis =

Scientific classification
- Kingdom: Animalia
- Phylum: Arthropoda
- Clade: Pancrustacea
- Class: Insecta
- Order: Coleoptera
- Suborder: Polyphaga
- Infraorder: Elateriformia
- Superfamily: Scirtoidea
- Family: Eucinetidae
- Genus: Bisaya; Reitter, 1884
- Species: B. nossidiiformis

Binomial name
- Bisaya nossidiiformis Reitter, 1884

Species of beetle

Bisaya nossidiiformis is a beetle that is native to Iran and the sole member of the genus Bisaya. Its diet consists mainly of dead wood and leaf litter .
