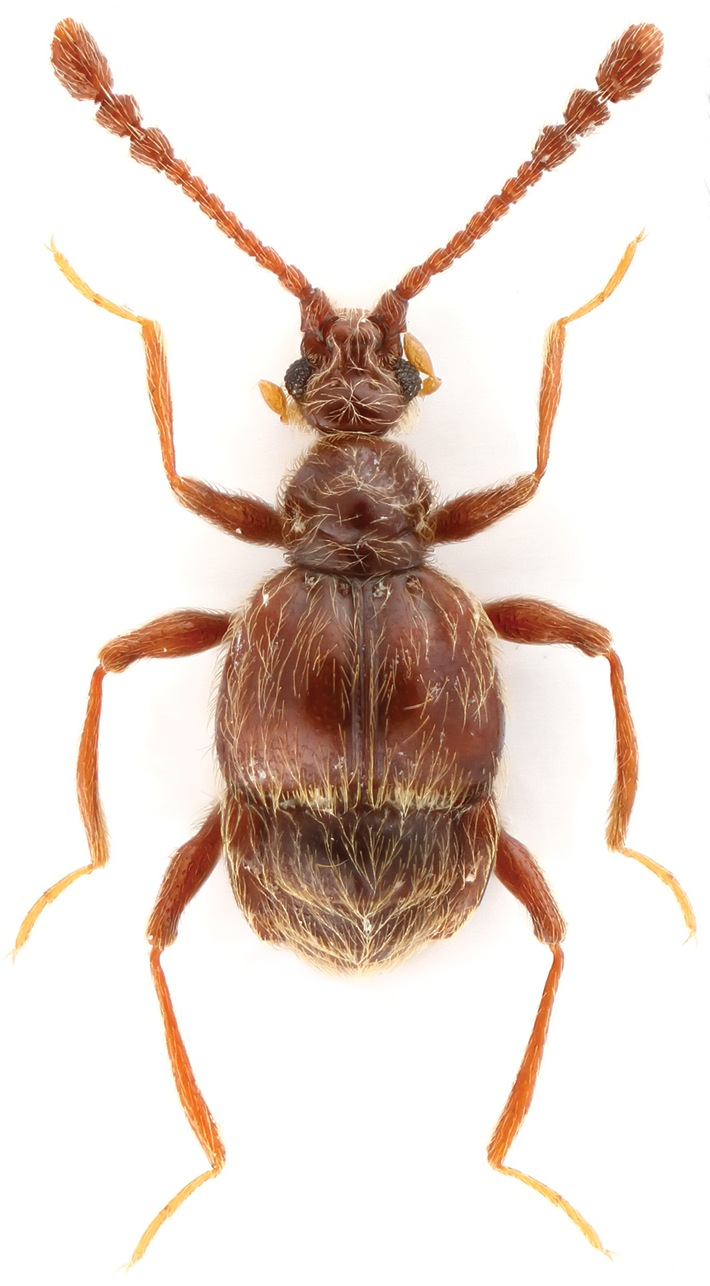
- Tyrodes jenisi

Scientific classification
- Kingdom: Animalia
- Phylum: Arthropoda
- Clade: Pancrustacea
- Class: Insecta
- Order: Coleoptera
- Suborder: Polyphaga
- Infraorder: Staphyliniformia
- Family: Staphylinidae
- Supertribe: Pselaphitae
- Tribe: Tyrini; Reitter, 1882

= Tyrini =

Tribe of beetles

Tyrini is a tribe of rove beetle.

== Subtribes ==
- Centrophthalmina
- Janusculina
- Somatipionina
- Tyrina
