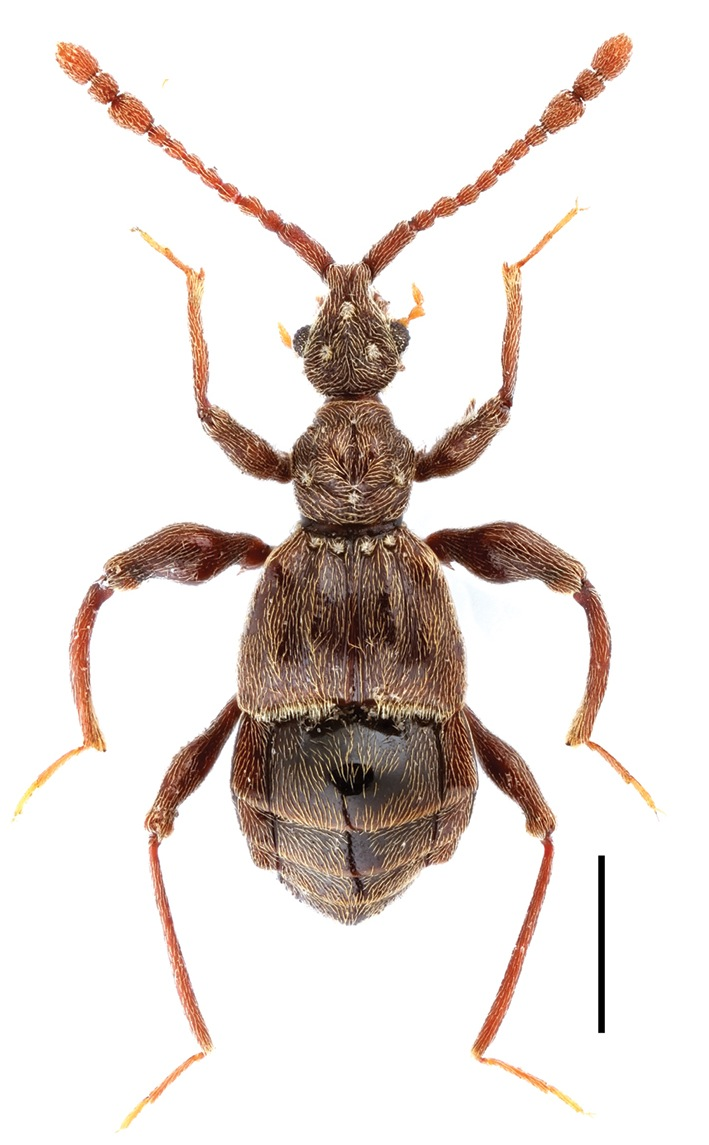
- Labomimus paratorus

Scientific classification
- Kingdom: Animalia
- Phylum: Arthropoda
- Clade: Pancrustacea
- Class: Insecta
- Order: Coleoptera
- Suborder: Polyphaga
- Infraorder: Staphyliniformia
- Family: Staphylinidae
- Subfamily: Pselaphinae
- Supertribe: Pselaphitae; Latreille, 1802

= Pselaphitae =

Supertribe of beetles

The Pselaphitae are a supertribe of rove beetles.

== Tribes ==
- Arhytodini
- Attapseniini
- Colilodionini
- Ctenistini
- Hybocephalini
- Odontalgini
- Pachygastrodini
- Phalepsini
- Pselaphini
- Schistodactylini
- Tmesiphorini
- Tyrini

== Genera ==
These 13 genera belong to the supertribe Pselaphitae:

- Atinus Horn, 1868^{i c g b}
- Biotus Casey, 1887^{i c g b}
- Caccoplectus Sharp, 1887^{i c g b}
- Cedius LeConte, 1849^{i c g b}
- Ceophyllus LeConte, 1849^{i c g b}
- Ctenisis Raffray, 1890^{i c g b}
- Ctenisodes Raffray, 1897^{i c g b}
- Hamotus Aubé, 1844^{i c g b}
- Mipseltyrus Park, 1953^{i c g b}
- Pselaphus Herbst, 1792^{i c g b}
- Tmesiphorus LeConte, 1849^{i c g b}
- Tyrus Aubé, 1833^{i c g b}
- Upoluna Schaufuss, 1886^{b}

Data sources: i = ITIS, c = Catalogue of Life, g = GBIF, b = Bugguide.net
