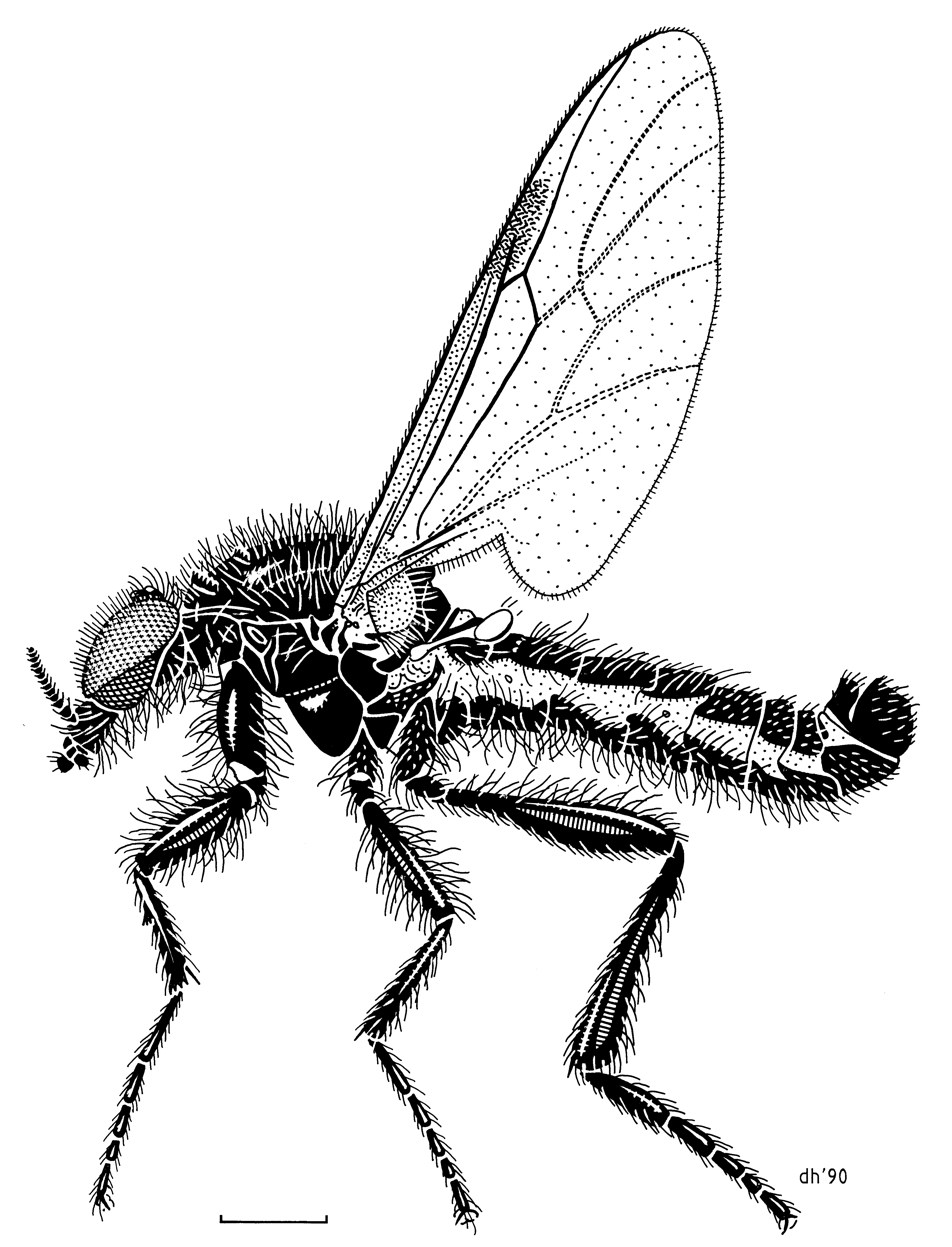
- Dilophus nigrostigma

Scientific classification
- Domain: Eukaryota
- Kingdom: Animalia
- Phylum: Arthropoda
- Class: Insecta
- Order: Diptera
- Family: Bibionidae
- Genus: Dilophus; Meigen, 1803

Type species
- Tipula febrilis Linnaeus, 1758

Synonyms
- Acanthocnemis Blanchard, 1852; Cnemidoctenia Enderlein, 1934; Dactylodiscia Enderlein, 1934; Philia Meigen, 1800; Tridicroctena Enderlein, 1934

= Dilophus =

Genus of flies

Dilophus is a genus of March flies in the family Bibionidae. There are at least 200 described species in Dilophus.

== Species found in Europe ==
- Dilophus antipedalis
- Dilophus beckeri
- Dilophus bispinosus
- Dilophus borealis
- Dilophus febrilis
- Dilophus femoratus
- Dilophus hiemalis
- Dilophus humeralis
- Dilophus lingens
- Dilophus maderae
- Dilophus minor
- Dilophus neglectus
- Dilophus oceanus
- Dilophus sardous
- Dilophus tenuis
- Dilophus tridentatus

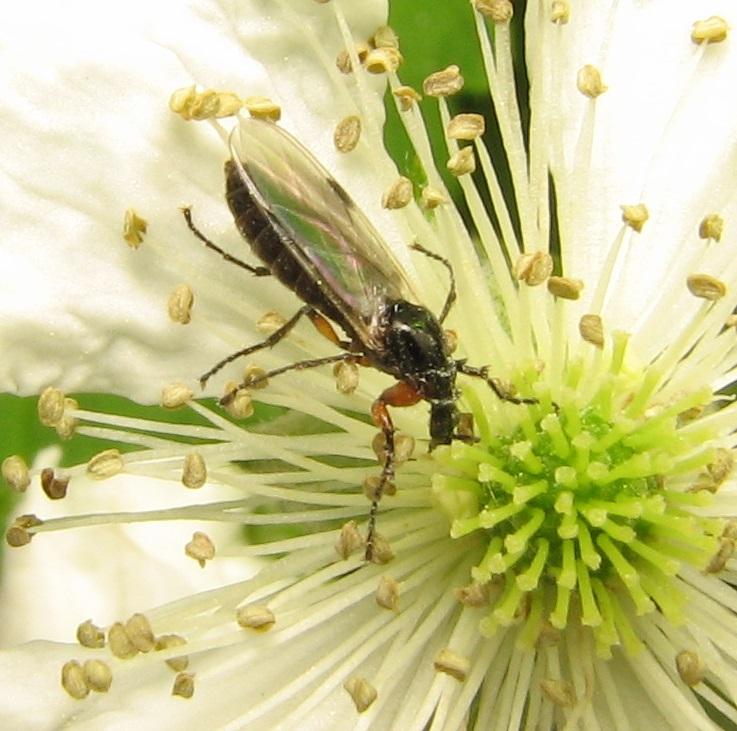
Dilophus sp., female

== See also ==
- List of Dilophus species
