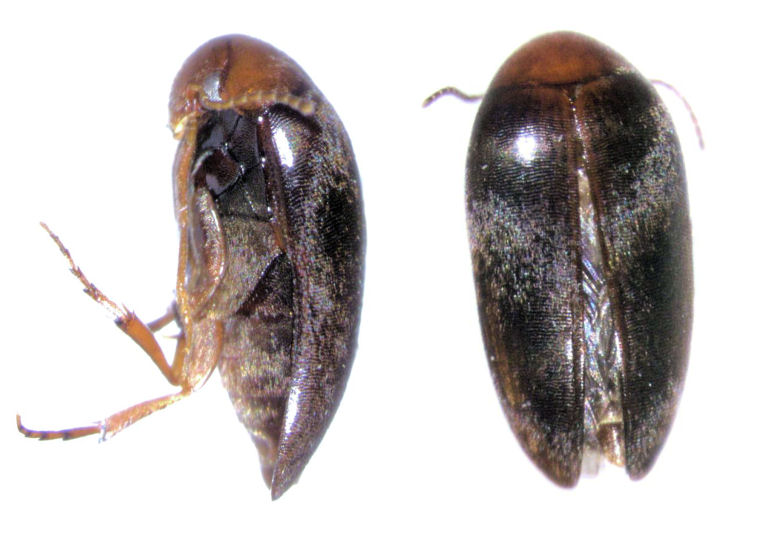
- Eucinetus stewarti

Scientific classification
- Kingdom: Animalia
- Phylum: Arthropoda
- Clade: Pancrustacea
- Class: Insecta
- Order: Coleoptera
- Suborder: Polyphaga
- Infraorder: Elateriformia
- Superfamily: Scirtoidea
- Family: Eucinetidae; Lacordaire, 1857

= Eucinetidae =

Eucinetidae Temporal range: Early Cretaceous–Recent

Family of beetles

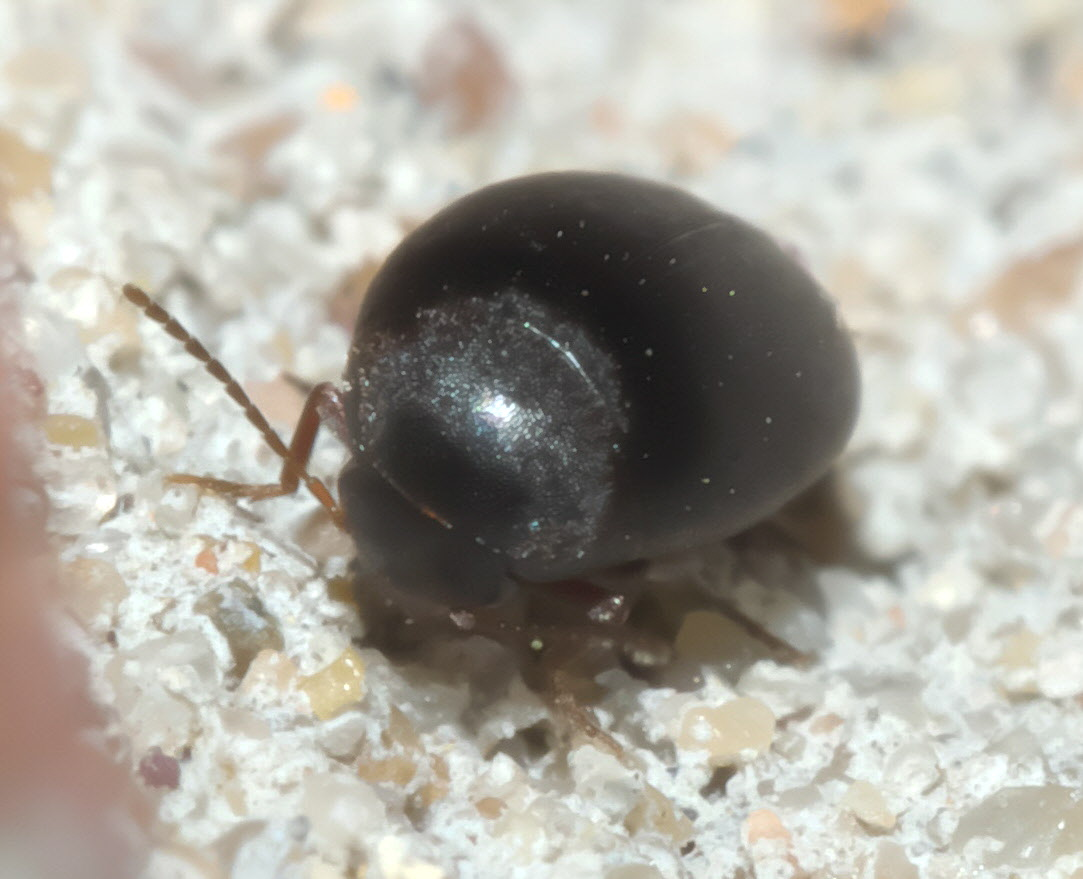
Eucinetus terminalis

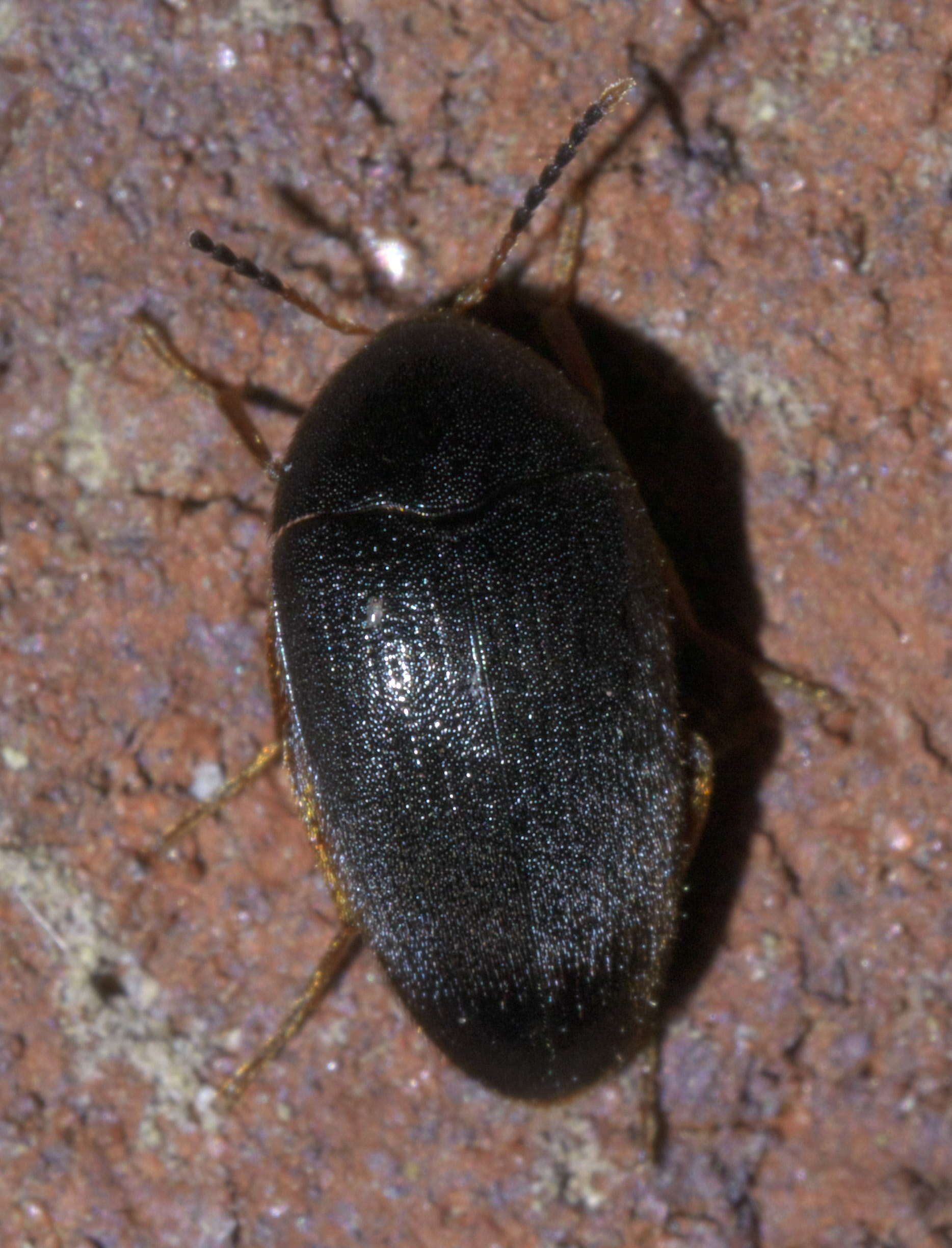
Eucinetus morio

Eucinetidae is a family of beetles, notable for their large coxal plates that cover much of the first ventrite of the abdomen, sometimes called plate-thigh beetles. The family is small for beetles, with about 50 species in 11 genera, but are found worldwide.

Adults are generally elliptical in shape, ranging from 0.8 to 4.0 mm in length, and black or brown in color. The head is small and bent underneath.

Eucinetids live in detritus or in fungus-covered tree bark, where both adults and larvae are assumed to eat various sorts of fungi. Around half of the genera possess strongly modified mouthparts, particularly the labrum, adapted for suctorial feeding.

== Genera ==
These genera belong to the family Eucinetidae:

- Eucinetella
- Eucinetus Germar, 1818
- Euscaphurus Casey, 1885
- Noteucinetus Bullians & Leschen, 2005
- Nycteus Latreille, 1829
- Peltocoleops Ponomarenko, 1990
- Subulistomella Sakai, 1980
- †Huaxiacinectus Hong 1995 Huachi-Huanhe Formation, China, Early Cretaceous (Hauterivian)
- Suctorial clade:
  - Eucilodes Vit, 1985
  - †Cretohlezkus Jałoszyński 2019 Burmese amber, Myanmar, mid Cretaceous (Albian-Cenomanian)
  - Bisaya Reitter, 1884
  - Jentozkus Vít, 1977
  - Tohlezkus Vít, 1977
  - Proeuzkus Vit, 2000
