= Sagola =

Sagola or Sagola may refer to:

- Sagola, a genus of beetle
- Sagola Township, Michigan
