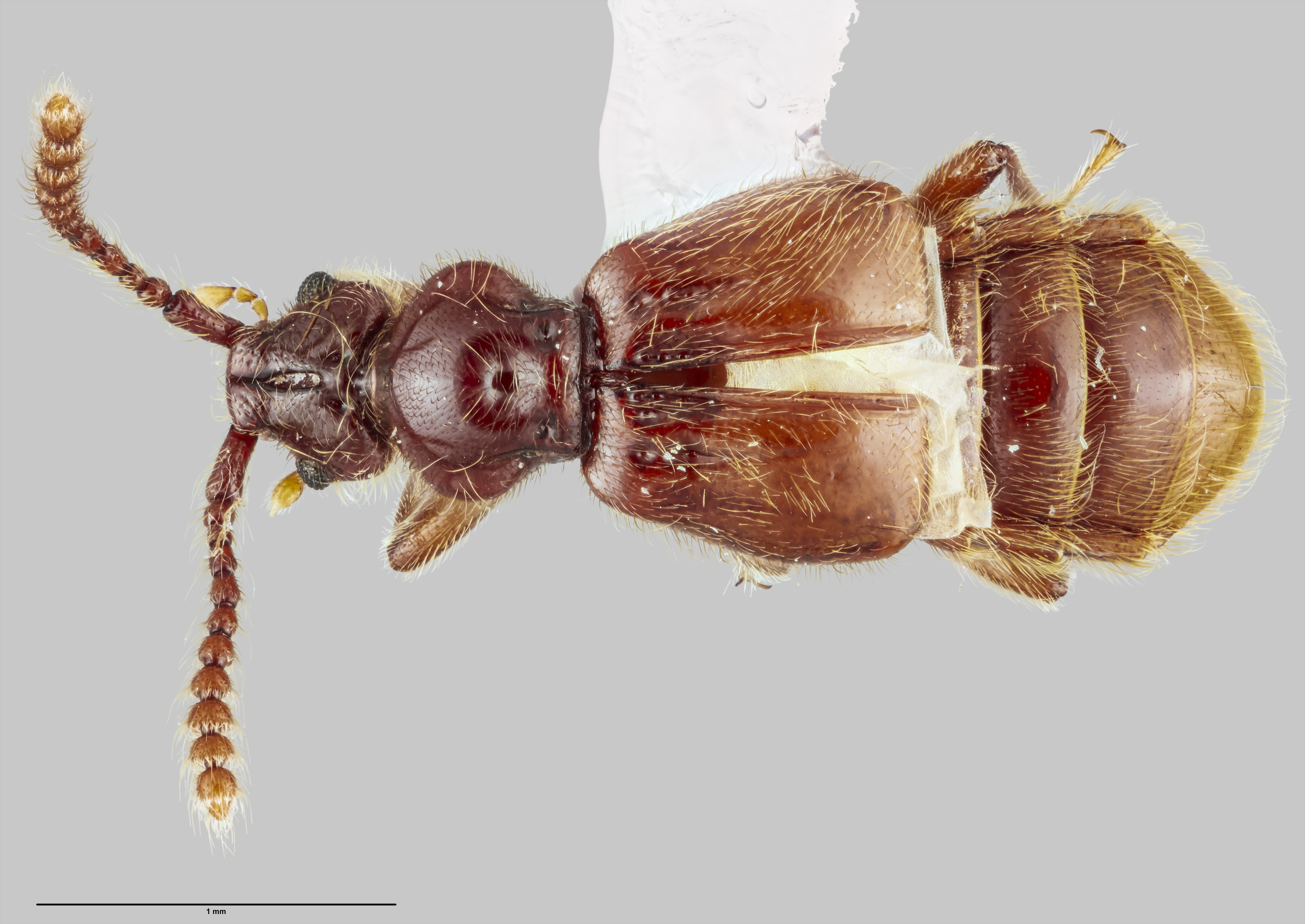
- Dorsal view of holotype specimen from the collections of Auckland War Memorial Museum
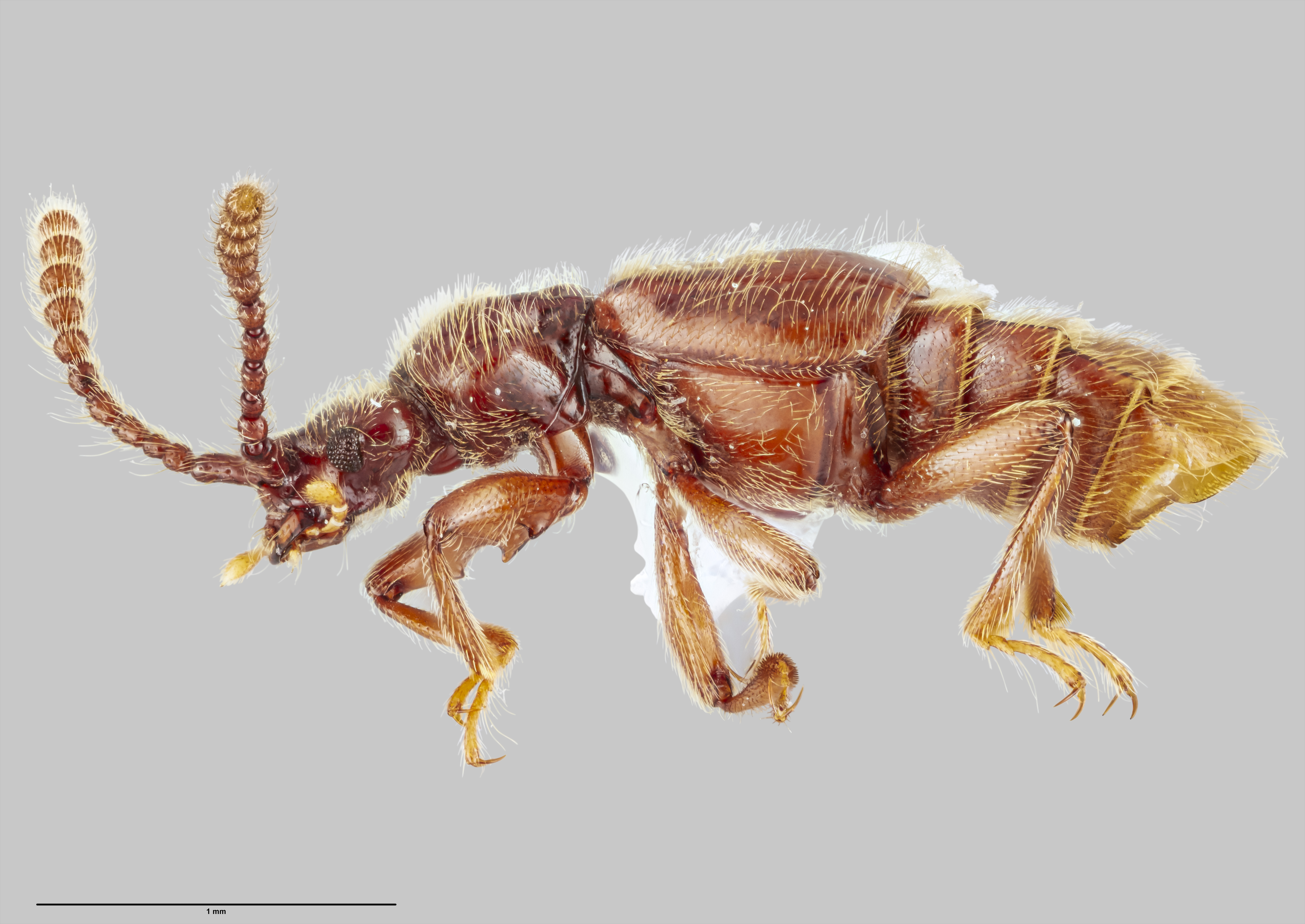
- Ventral view of holotype specimen from the collections of Auckland War Memorial Museum

Scientific classification
- Kingdom: Animalia
- Phylum: Arthropoda
- Clade: Pancrustacea
- Class: Insecta
- Order: Coleoptera
- Suborder: Polyphaga
- Infraorder: Staphyliniformia
- Family: Staphylinidae
- Genus: Sagola
- Species: S. thorpei

Binomial name
- Sagola thorpei Park & Carlton, 2014

= Sagola thorpei =

Species of beetle

Sagola thorpei is a species of rove beetle belonging to the family Staphylinidae. The species was first described by Jong-Seok Park and Christopher E. Carlton in 2014, and is endemic to New Zealand.

== Taxonomy ==
The species was identified by Slovakian entomologist Jong-Seok Park and Christopher E. Carlton in 2014, based on a holotype collected by John Early and Stephen E. Thorpe in November 1999 from Cuvier Island. Park and Carlton named the species after Thorpe.

== Description ==
S. thorpei has a brown body and a length between 2.7–3.2 mm (0.11–0.13 in). It can be distinguished from other members of Sagola due to having antennomeres 1 and 4 elongated (three times longer than side), well-developed hind wings and a unique genitalia shape.

== Distribution and habitat ==
The species is endemic to New Zealand, known to occur in islands of the Hauraki Gulf and off the northeast coast of the Coromandel Peninsula, North Island.
