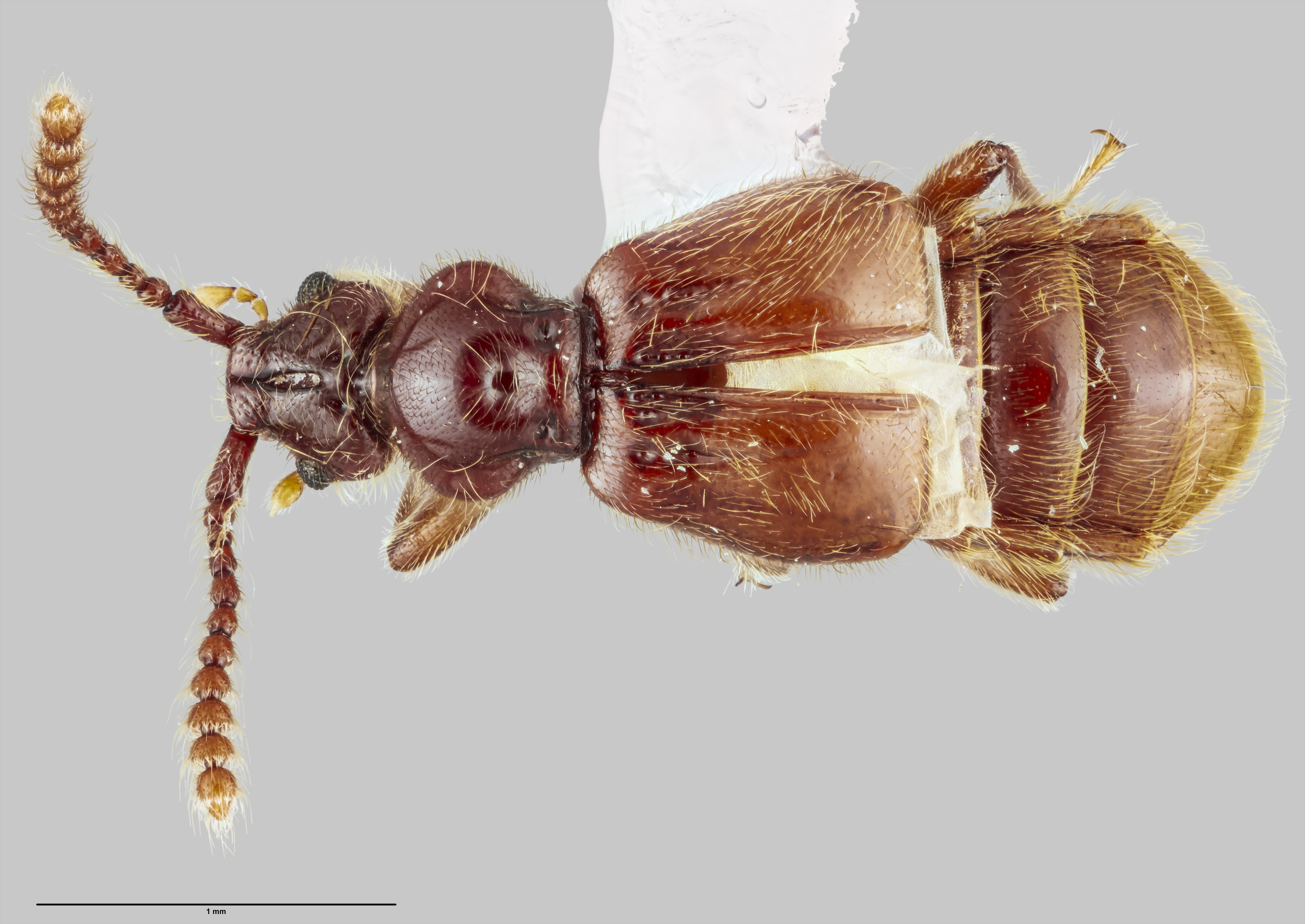
- Sagola thorpei

Scientific classification
- Kingdom: Animalia
- Phylum: Arthropoda
- Class: Insecta
- Order: Coleoptera
- Suborder: Polyphaga
- Infraorder: Staphyliniformia
- Family: Staphylinidae
- Subfamily: Pselaphinae
- Supertribe: Faronitae
- Genus: Sagola; Sharp, 1874

= Sagola (beetle) =

Genus of beetles

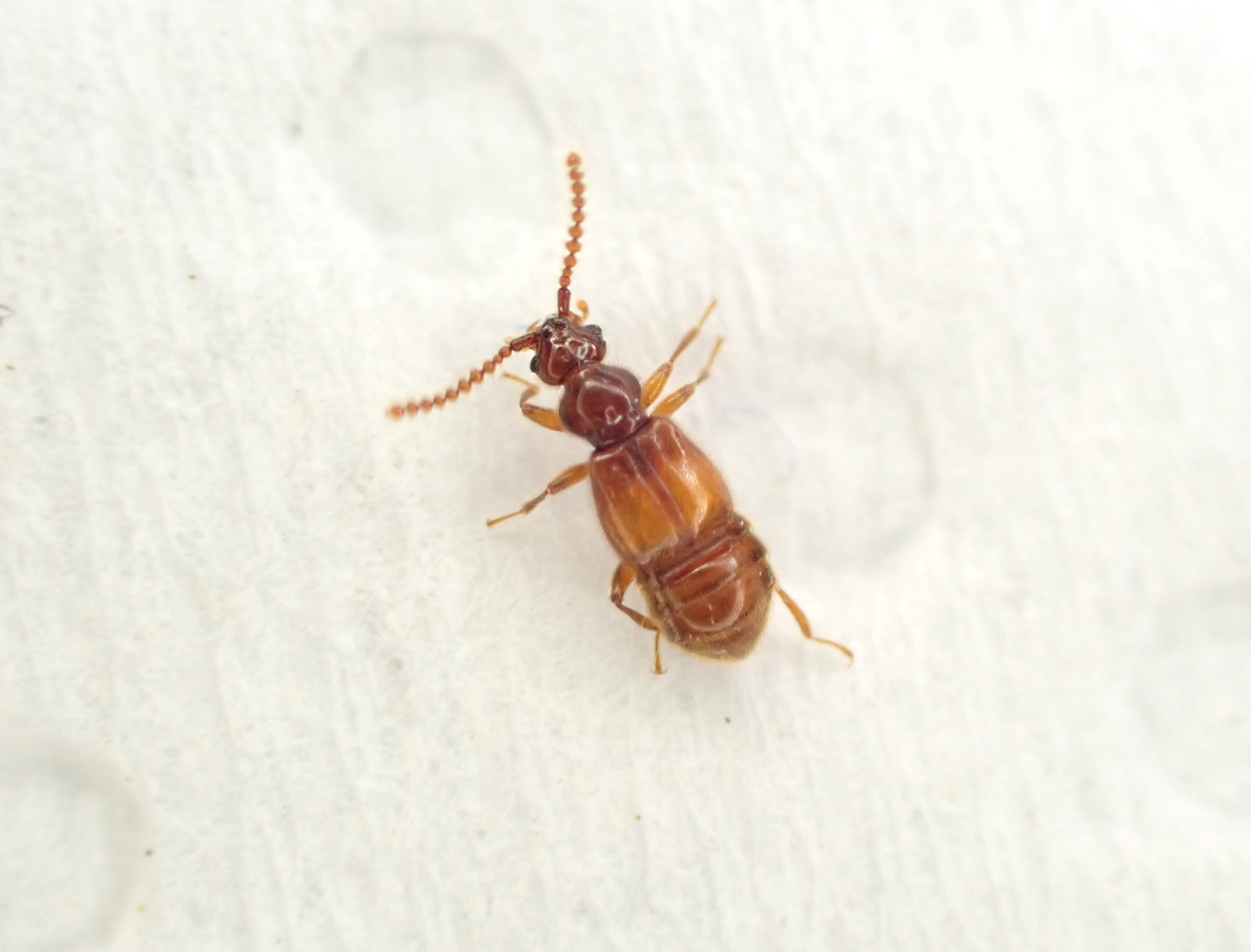
Sagola, New Zealand

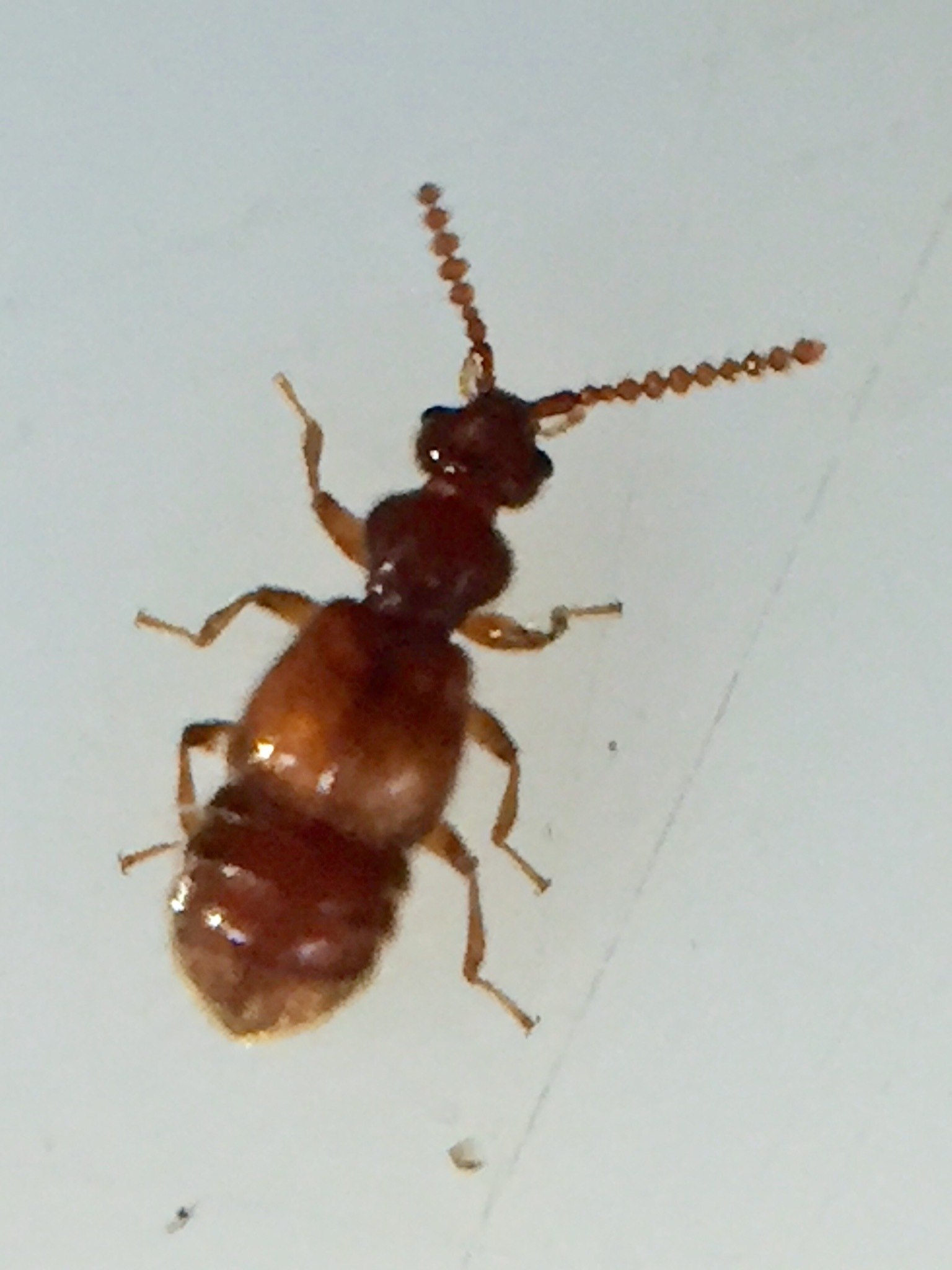
Sagola parva, New Zealand

Sagola is a genus of beetles in the Staphylinidae family, found in New Zealand and Australia. It was first described by the entomologist David Sharp in 1874. The New Zealand species within the genus were revised in 2014 with numerous new species being described.

== Species ==
Species include:

- Sagola angulifera Broun, 1911 (New Zealand)
- Sagola anisarthra Broun, 1893 (New Zealand)
- Sagola arboricola Broun, 1921 (New Zealand)
- Sagola aucklandensis Park, Jong-Seok & Carlton, 2014 (New Zealand)
- Sagola auripila Broun, 1911 (New Zealand)
- Sagola australiae Lea, 1912 (Australia)
- Sagola baiknami Park, Jong-Seok & Carlton, 2014 (New Zealand)
- Sagola baylessae Park, Jong-Seok & Carlton, 2014 (New Zealand)
- Sagola bifida Broun, 1915 (New Zealand)
- Sagola bipunctata Broun, 1886 (New Zealand)
- Sagola bituberata Broun, 1914 (New Zealand)
- Sagola boonei Park, Jong-Seok & Carlton, 2014 (New Zealand)
- Sagola boothi Park, Jong-Seok & Carlton, 2014 (New Zealand)
- Sagola boudreauxae Park, Jong-Seok & Carlton, 2014 (New Zealand)
- Sagola brevipennides Newton, 2017 (Australia)
- Sagola brookesi Park, Jong-Seok & Carlton, 2014 (New Zealand)
- Sagola brouni Park, Jong-Seok & Carlton, 2014 (New Zealand)
- Sagola brumfieldi Park, Jong-Seok & Carlton, 2014 (New Zealand)
- Sagola buckleyi Park, Jong-Seok & Carlton, 2014 (New Zealand)
- Sagola bullerensis Park, Jong-Seok & Carlton, 2014 (New Zealand)
- Sagola butcherae Park, Jong-Seok & Carlton, 2014 (New Zealand)
- Sagola canterburyensis Park, Jong-Seok & Carlton, 2014 (New Zealand)
- Sagola castanea Broun, 1886 (New Zealand)
- Sagola chandleri Park, Jong-Seok & Carlton, 2014 (New Zealand)
- Sagola chathamensis Park, Jong-Seok & Carlton, 2014 (New Zealand (Chatham Is.))
- Sagola choeunae Park, Jong-Seok & Carlton, 2014 (New Zealand)
- Sagola clarkei Park, Jong-Seok & Carlton, 2014 (New Zealand)
- Sagola clunieae Park, Jong-Seok & Carlton, 2014 (New Zealand)
- Sagola convexa Broun, 1886 (New Zealand)
- Sagola coromandelensis Park, Jong-Seok & Carlton, 2014 (New Zealand)
- Sagola crawi Park, Jong-Seok & Carlton, 2014 (New Zealand)
- Sagola cuvierensis Park, Jong-Seok & Carlton, 2014 (New Zealand)
- Sagola deformipes Broun, 1880 (New Zealand)
- Sagola denticollis Broun, 1880 (New Zealand)
- Sagola dugdalei Park, Jong-Seok & Carlton, 2014 (New Zealand)
- Sagola duplicata Broun, 1886 (New Zealand)
- Sagola earlyi Park, Jong-Seok & Carlton, 2014 (New Zealand)
- Sagola egmontensis Park, Jong-Seok & Carlton, 2014 (New Zealand)
- Sagola embersoni Park, Jong-Seok & Carlton, 2014 (New Zealand)
- Sagola eminens Broun, 1895 (New Zealand)
- Sagola excavata Broun, 1886 (New Zealand)
- Sagola fairburni Park, Jong-Seok & Carlton, 2014 (New Zealand)
- Sagola ferroi Park, Jong-Seok & Carlton, 2014 (New Zealand)
- Sagola filixicola Oke, 1928 (Australia)
- Sagola fiordlandensis Park, Jong-Seok & Carlton, 2014 (New Zealand)
- Sagola flavipes Broun, 1893 (New Zealand)
- Sagola flemingensis Park, Jong-Seok & Carlton, 2014 (New Zealand (Auckland Is.))
- Sagola formicicola Oke, 1925 (Australia)
- Sagola foveicornis Oke, 1932 (Australia)
- Sagola furcata Broun, 1921 (New Zealand)
- Sagola genalis Broun, 1881 (New Zealand)
- Sagola gilae Park, Jong-Seok & Carlton, 2014 (New Zealand)
- Sagola gimmeli Park, Jong-Seok & Carlton, 2014 (New Zealand)
- Sagola gisbornensis Park, Jong-Seok & Carlton, 2014 (New Zealand)
- Sagola gourlayi Park, Jong-Seok & Carlton, 2014 (New Zealand)
- Sagola gyudongi Park, Jong-Seok & Carlton, 2014 (New Zealand)
- Sagola hanae Park, Jong-Seok & Carlton, 2014 (New Zealand)
- Sagola hectorii Broun, 1917 (New Zealand)
- Sagola helenae Oke, 1925 (Australia)
- Sagola helmorei Park, Jong-Seok & Carlton, 2014 (New Zealand)
- Sagola hirtalis Broun, 1893 (New Zealand)
- Sagola horokakaensis Park, Jong-Seok & Carlton, 2014 (New Zealand)
- Sagola humpridgensis Park, Jong-Seok & Carlton, 2014 (New Zealand)
- Sagola hunterensis Park, Jong-Seok & Carlton, 2014 (New Zealand)
- Sagola hunuaensis Park, Jong-Seok & Carlton, 2014 (New Zealand)
- Sagola huvali Park, Jong-Seok & Carlton, 2014 (New Zealand)
- Sagola ignota Broun, 1921 (New Zealand)
- Sagola incisa Théry & Leschen, 2013 (New Zealand (Three Kings Is.))
- Sagola insignis Broun, 1893 (New Zealand)
- Sagola jeongnamae Park, Jong-Seok & Carlton, 2014 (New Zealand)
- Sagola kahurangiensis Park, Jong-Seok & Carlton, 2014 (New Zealand)
- Sagola keejeongi Park, Jong-Seok & Carlton, 2014 (New Zealand)
- Sagola kuscheli Park, Jong-Seok & Carlton, 2014 (New Zealand)
- Sagola laticeps Broun, 1911 (New Zealand)
- Sagola latistriata Broun, 1911 (New Zealand)
- Sagola lescheni Park, Jong-Seok & Carlton, 2014 (New Zealand)
- Sagola lewisensis Park, Jong-Seok & Carlton, 2014 (New Zealand)
- Sagola mackenziensis Park, Jong-Seok & Carlton, 2014 (New Zealand)
- Sagola major Sharp, 1874 (New Zealand)
- Sagola marlboroughensis Park, Jong-Seok & Carlton, 2014 (New Zealand)
- Sagola marrisi Park, Jong-Seok & Carlton, 2014 (New Zealand (Three Kings Is.))
- Sagola mayae Park, Jong-Seok & Carlton, 2014 (New Zealand)
- Sagola mercuryensis Park, Jong-Seok & Carlton, 2014 (New Zealand)
- Sagola misella Sharp, 1874 (New Zealand)
- Sagola moehauensis Park, Jong-Seok & Carlton, 2014 (New Zealand)
- Sagola monstrosa Reitter, 1880 (New Zealand)
- Sagola monticola Broun, 1912 (New Zealand)
- Sagola muirae Park, Jong-Seok & Carlton, 2014 (New Zealand)
- Sagola murchisonensis Park, Jong-Seok & Carlton, 2014 (New Zealand)
- Sagola newtoni Park, Jong-Seok & Carlton, 2014 (New Zealand)
- Sagola northlandensis Park, Jong-Seok & Carlton, 2014 (New Zealand)
- Sagola notabilis Broun, 1880 (New Zealand)
- Sagola nunni Park, Jong-Seok & Carlton, 2014 (New Zealand)
- Sagola opercularis Broun, 1915 (New Zealand)
- Sagola otagoensis Park, Jong-Seok & Carlton, 2014 (New Zealand)
- Sagola otteai Park, Jong-Seok & Carlton, 2014 (New Zealand)
- Sagola owensae Park, Jong-Seok & Carlton, 2014 (New Zealand)
- Sagola parva Sharp, 1874 (New Zealand)
- Sagola pecki Park, Jong-Seok & Carlton, 2014 (New Zealand)
- Sagola pertinax Broun, 1893 (New Zealand)
- Sagola pittensis Park, Jong-Seok & Carlton, 2014 (New Zealand (Chatham Is.))
- Sagola planipennis Broun, 1921 (New Zealand)
- Sagola plentyensis Park, Jong-Seok & Carlton, 2014 (New Zealand)
- Sagola poortmani Park, Jong-Seok & Carlton, 2014 (New Zealand)
- Sagola prisca Sharp, 1874 (New Zealand)
- Sagola prowellae Park, Jong-Seok & Carlton, 2014 (New Zealand)
- Sagola pulchra Broun, 1880 (New Zealand)
- Sagola punctulata Raffray, 1893 (New Zealand)
- Sagola ramsayi Park, Jong-Seok & Carlton, 2014 (New Zealand)
- Sagola ranatungae Park, Jong-Seok & Carlton, 2014 (New Zealand)
- Sagola robustula Broun, 1917 (New Zealand)
- Sagola rugicornis Oke, 1932 (Australia)
- Sagola rugifrons Broun, 1895 (New Zealand)
- Sagola rustica Broun, 1915 (New Zealand)
- Sagola sharpi Raffray, 1893 (New Zealand)
- Sagola sheldoni Park, Jong-Seok & Carlton, 2014 (New Zealand)
- Sagola snaresensis Park, Jong-Seok & Carlton, 2014 (New Zealand (Snares Is.))
- Sagola socia Broun, 1915 (New Zealand)
- Sagola sokolovi Park, Jong-Seok & Carlton, 2014 (New Zealand)
- Sagola solodovnikovi Park, Jong-Seok & Carlton, 2014 (New Zealand)
- Sagola southlandensis Park, Jong-Seok & Carlton, 2014 (New Zealand)
- Sagola spiniventris Broun, 1912 (New Zealand)
- Sagola stewartensis Park, Jong-Seok & Carlton, 2014 (New Zealand (Stewart I.))
- Sagola strialis Broun, 1921 (New Zealand)
- Sagola sulcator Broun, 1886 (New Zealand)
- Sagola sunsookae Park, Jong-Seok & Carlton, 2014 (New Zealand)
- Sagola taegyui Park, Jong-Seok & Carlton, 2014 (New Zealand)
- Sagola taranakiensis Park, Jong-Seok & Carlton, 2014 (New Zealand)
- Sagola tararuaensis Park, Jong-Seok & Carlton, 2014 (New Zealand)
- Sagola tasmaniae Lea, 1911 (Australia)
- Sagola taupoensis Park, Jong-Seok & Carlton, 2014 (New Zealand)
- Sagola tekoauensis Park, Jong-Seok & Carlton, 2014 (New Zealand)
- Sagola tenebrica Broun, 1921 (New Zealand)
- Sagola tennysonensis Park, Jong-Seok & Carlton, 2014 (New Zealand)
- Sagola terricola Broun, 1886 (New Zealand)
- Sagola thayerae Park, Jong-Seok & Carlton, 2014 (New Zealand)
- Sagola thorpei Park, Jong-Seok & Carlton, 2014 (New Zealand)
- Sagola threekingsensis Park, Jong-Seok & Carlton, 2014 (New Zealand (Three Kings Is.))
- Sagola tishechkini Park, Jong-Seok & Carlton, 2014 (New Zealand)
- Sagola townsendi Park, Jong-Seok & Carlton, 2014 (New Zealand)
- Sagola triregia Théry & Leschen, 2013 (New Zealand (Three Kings Is.))
- Sagola turretensis Park, Jong-Seok & Carlton, 2014 (New Zealand)
- Sagola unuwhaoensis Park, Jong-Seok & Carlton, 2014 (New Zealand)
- Sagola valida Broun, 1921 (New Zealand)
- Sagola victoriae Oke, 1925 (Australia)
- Sagola waikatoensis Park, Jong-Seok & Carlton, 2014 (New Zealand)
- Sagola waipouaensis Park, Jong-Seok & Carlton, 2014 (New Zealand)
- Sagola wairarapaensis Park, Jong-Seok & Carlton, 2014 (New Zealand)
- Sagola walkerae Park, Jong-Seok & Carlton, 2014 (New Zealand)
- Sagola watti Park, Jong-Seok & Carlton, 2014 (New Zealand)
- Sagola weiri Park, Jong-Seok & Carlton, 2014 (New Zealand)
- Sagola wellingtonensis Park, Jong-Seok & Carlton, 2014 (New Zealand)
