= Determination (biology) =

Process of matching a specimen of an organism to a known taxon

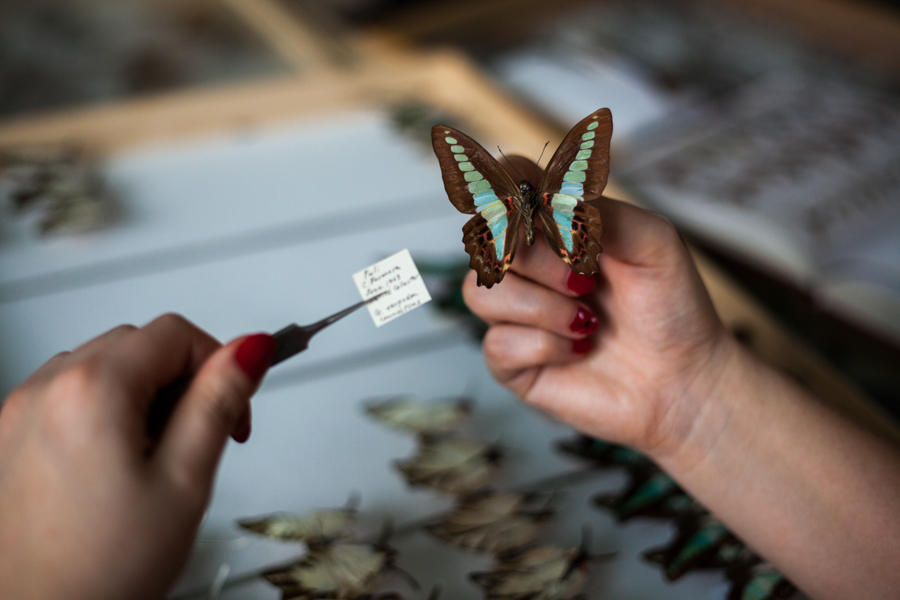
The labeling of a specimen after its taxonomic identity has been determined.

In biology, determination is the process of matching a specimen or sample of an organism to a known taxon, for example identifying a plant as belonging to a particular species. Expert taxonomists may perform this task, but structures created by taxonomists are sometimes used by non-specialists. Modern tools include single or multi-access identification keys, which can be printed or computer-assisted.

== Overview ==
The need to identify which plant is which has existed for time immemorial. The ability depends to a large extent on what criteria and whose system is used. Determination now relies on modern taxonomy to identify organisms. Taxonomy is the branch of biology which deals with identity, nomenclature and classification. The term was first coined in 1813 by Swiss botanist Augustin Pyramus de Candolle. Carl Linnaeus, who began modern taxonomy, used the term 'systematics' himself.

Determination then requires comparisons of certain characteristics and then assigning a particular specimen to a known taxonomic group, hopefully ultimately arriving at a species or infraspecific name. The characteristics used are usually morphological, such as colours, numbers, shapes and sizes of particular organs. Where possible, this is traditionally done using dichotomous keys. Keys are traditionally found in works such as floras, field guides or monographs. Botanical or entomological keys have been coded as computer programs. Applications are even available now which use artificial intelligence to identify plants on the basis of photographs. There are not always keys available for certain regions or plant groups, and the person determining the specimen will then have to rely on characteristics in the species description or discovered through comparison of multiple specimens with the type. Using DNA barcoding is a modern method that does not require the determiner to be highly trained. Another similar method uses the alkaloid profiles of specimens to determine the species. The total weight or length of the genome as measured in base-pairs can be used to identify species. Paleontologists must be able to identify their specimens based only on the shapes and sizes of fossilised bones. In forestry, especially in the tropics, identifying trees based on the flowers or leaves high up in the crown can be difficult, a method of identifying tree species in this case is called a 'slash', a shallow machete cut to the trunk to expose the colours of the different layers inside, and show the type of sap. The science of identifying plant species using their pollen is called palynology. Geography and habitat can also sometimes help in narrowing down the identity of a specimen. Sometimes the determiner will be unable to identify a specimen clearly, and use such additions as cf. or aff. to convey this.

Reference collections of identified plant specimens are collected into herbaria. Most plant parts are dried, pressed, mounted on herbarium sheets and stored; succulents and some other types of plants are normally kept in alcohol solution. The sheets are a standard size of 16 1/2 × 11 1/2 inches or 41.25 × 28.75 cm. The identified plant ideally includes all parts including roots, flowers and fruits, strobili, etc. Especially the flowers are important when trying to identify a specimen.

== Computer-assisted identification ==
Automated species identification uses artificial intelligence to identify species based on the images of the species. Projects like iNaturalist and Pl@ntNet relies on crowdsourced data and assists identification through automatic as well as community input. Aerial images from planes or UAVs may also be employed to monitor ecosystem composition using artificial neural networks trained to delineate plant species, although the transferrability of those models in time and space is often limited.

== See also ==
- Alpha taxonomy
- Field guide
- Plant morphology
- Pollen DNA barcoding
