= Australian online fauna & flora databases =

Australian online fauna & flora databases: Both the Commonwealth of Australia and its various states maintain a number of online databases which encompass both native and naturalised fauna and flora. Some are taxonomic. Some are descriptive. Some are both. Some indicate threatened or nuisance species. The list below is incomplete.

== Australian databases ==
ABRS (Australian Biological Resources Study) online resources lists:

- Australian Faunal Directory lists Australian fauna and gives the AFD ID used for finding information about Australian fauna, and appearing on the taxonbar for species such as Koala.
- Australian Fresh Water Algal Name Index (not yet used in wikidata)
- Flora of Australia used for the id FoAO2 and found on the taxonbar for e.g., Boronia. This database gives a full description of the plant (for plants which have so far been included).
- Australian Weeds gives the wikidata ID, Australian Weed ID.
- Australian Tropical Rainforest Plants which gives the wikidata ATRF id, seen for example in the taxonbar for Acacia celsa. The home site includes a lucid key which allows identification of Australian Tropical Rainforest plants, via a multi-access key.
- Species Profile and Threats database which gives the wikidata ID, Sprat ID, seen for example in the taxonbar for Albert's lyrebird, and Acacia ammophila.

and numerous other databases.

=== Supported by Council of Heads of Australasian Herbaria ===
- Australian Plant Name Index: a taxonomic & name database for plants
- Fungi database: gives the AusFungiID, for native and naturalised fungi. (This is a taxonomic and name database.)
- Lichen database: gives the wikidata ID, AusLichenID for native and naturalised lichen.
- AusMoss (not yet used in wikidata)

== State databases ==
The majority of these are curated by state herbaria (but Queensland produces a government originated database).

- Queensland biota includes both fauna and flora found in Queensland (and is useful for this fact), and gives the taxon's status under the Queensland conservation act. Taxon names do not necessarily match current usage. This database is used for Queensland Biota ID in wikidata (not currently included in the taxonbar).
- Flora NT: Northern Territory Flora online gives the wikidata id, NT Flora ID, seen for example in the taxonbar for Lysiphyllum cunninghamii.
- PlantNET, FloraBase, efloraSA, VicFlora are all state herbaria curated databases which are both descriptive and taxonomic. Each supplies IDs to wikidata which are seen in the taxonbar. See, e.g., Newcastelia cephalantha, and Muellerina eucalyptoides.
