= Articerodes =

Scientific classification
- Domain: Eukaryota
- Kingdom: Animalia
- Phylum: Arthropoda
- Class: Insecta
- Order: Coleoptera
- Suborder: Polyphaga
- Infraorder: Staphyliniformia
- Family: Staphylinidae
- Subfamily: Pselaphinae
- Supertribe: Clavigeritae
- Tribe: Clavigerini
- Subtribe: Clavigeriodina
- Genus: Articerodes; Raffray, 1890

Type species
- Articerodes syriacus (Sauley, 1865)

Species
- See text

Genus of beetles

Articerodes is a genus of beetles belonging to the family Staphylinidae. Species of Articerodes have been found within the Palearctic, Oriental, and Afrotropical biogeographic realms. In the Oriental realm, four species were known, all from islands. The first examples found on the Asian mainland were discovered and described in 2008 by Dr. Shuhei Nomura, Dr. Watana Sakchoowong and Dr. Jariya Chanpaisaeng.

They are placed within subtribe Clavigeriodina due to their occipital carina, elytral pubescence, and composite tergite. Members of Articerodes have three-segmented antennae.

== Species ==
- Articerodes jariyae Nomura, Sakchoowong, and Chanpaisaeng, 2008
- Articerodes kishimotoi Nomura, 2001
- Articerodes kurosawai Nomura, 2001
- Articerodes longiceps Nomura, Sakchoowong, and Chanpaisaeng, 2008
- Articerodes ohmomoi Nomura, Sakchoowong, and Chanpaisaeng, 2008
- Articerodes syriacus Sauley, 1865
- Articerodes thailandicus Nomura, Sakchoowong, and Chanpaisaeng, 2008
