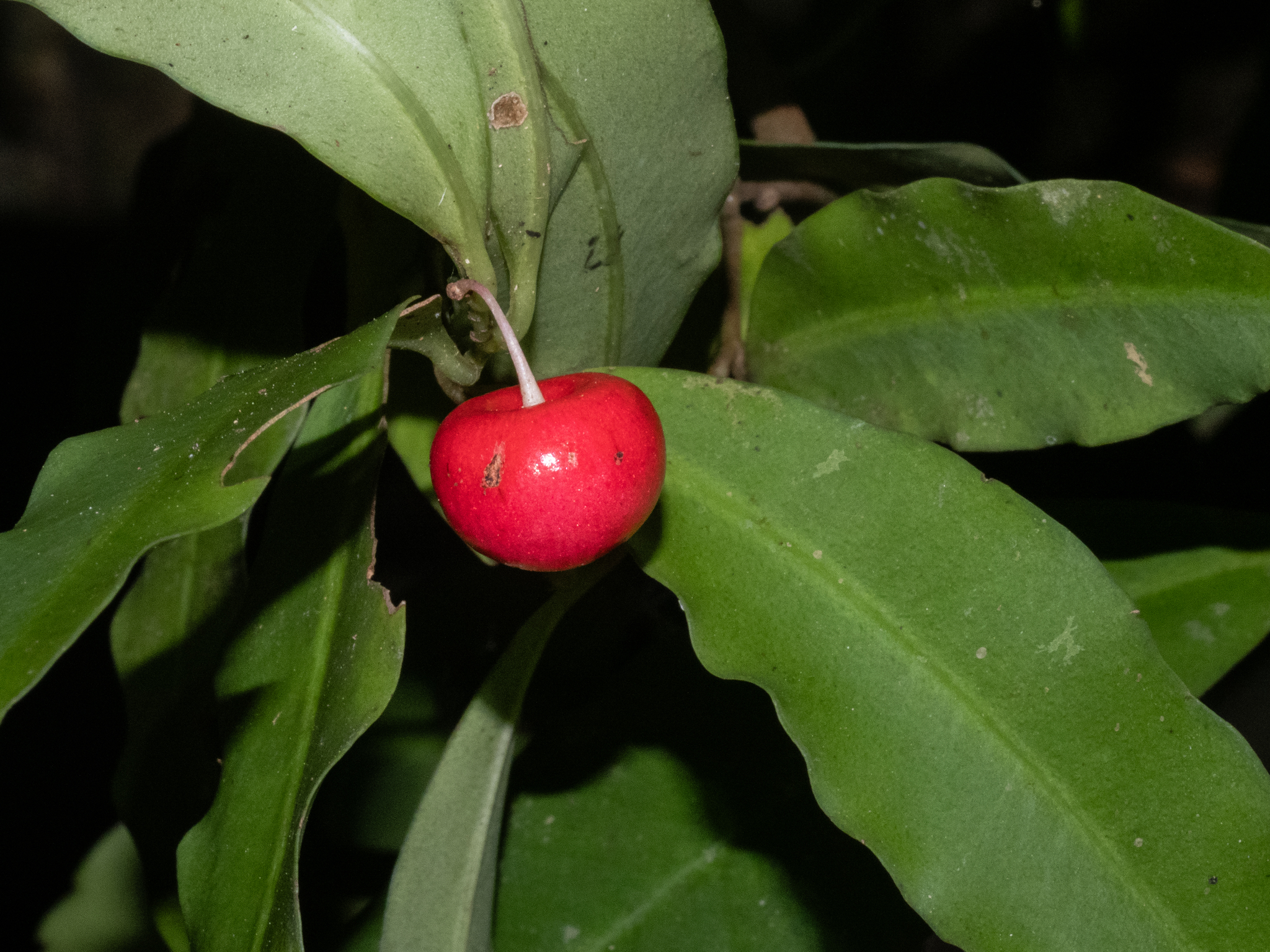
- Fruit

Conservation status
- Least Concern (IUCN 3.1)

Scientific classification
- Kingdom: Plantae
- Clade: Embryophytes
- Clade: Tracheophytes
- Clade: Spermatophytes
- Clade: Angiosperms
- Clade: Eudicots
- Clade: Asterids
- Order: Ericales
- Family: Primulaceae
- Genus: Ardisia
- Species: A. brevipedata

Binomial name
- Ardisia brevipedata F.Muell.

Synonyms
- Bladhia brevipedata (F.Muell.) F.Muell.; Tinus brevipedata (F.Muell.) Kuntze; Ardisia apus Mez

= Ardisia brevipedata =

Species of flowering plant

Ardisia brevipedata, commonly known as rambling spearflower, is a species of plant in the primrose family Primulaceae. It is native to the Wet Tropics bioregion of Queensland, Australia.

== Description ==
Ardisia brevipedata is an understorey shrub or small tree usually growing to about 3 m (9.8 ft) in height, and occasionally to 6 m (20 ft). The leaves are arranged on the twigs either alternately or spirally, and are attached by petioles about 7 mm (0.3 in) long. The leaf blades are elliptic to obovate, up to 17 cm (6.7 in) long and 5 cm (2.0 in) wide, and the venation is obscure.

Inflorescences of 12—25 individual flowers emerge from the leaf axils in umbels. The flowers five petals and sepals which are pale translucent pink, cream or green, and measure about 3 mm (0.12 in) long and 5 mm (0.20 in) wide. The fruit is a red globose berry about 10 by 13 mm (0.39 by 0.51 in).

== Taxonomy ==
It was first described in 1868 by the German-Australian botanist Ferdinand von Mueller, and published in his massive work Fragmenta phytographiæ Australiæ. The description was based on an unnumbered specimen collected by John Dallachy in Rockingham Bay.

== Distribution and habitat ==
The species is found in the Wet Tropics bioregion of northeast Queensland, ranging from Paluma Range National Park in the south to the area around Rossville in the north. It inhabits rainforests at altitudes from sea level to about 1,400 m (4,600 ft).

Plants of the World Online and the Global Biodiversity Information Facility state that the plant also occurs in New Guinea, while Australian Tropical Rainforest Plants and Flora of Australia both state that it is endemic to Queensland.

== Conservation ==
As of September 2025, this species has been assessed to be of least concern by the International Union for Conservation of Nature (IUCN) and by the Queensland Government under its Nature Conservation Act.

== Gallery ==
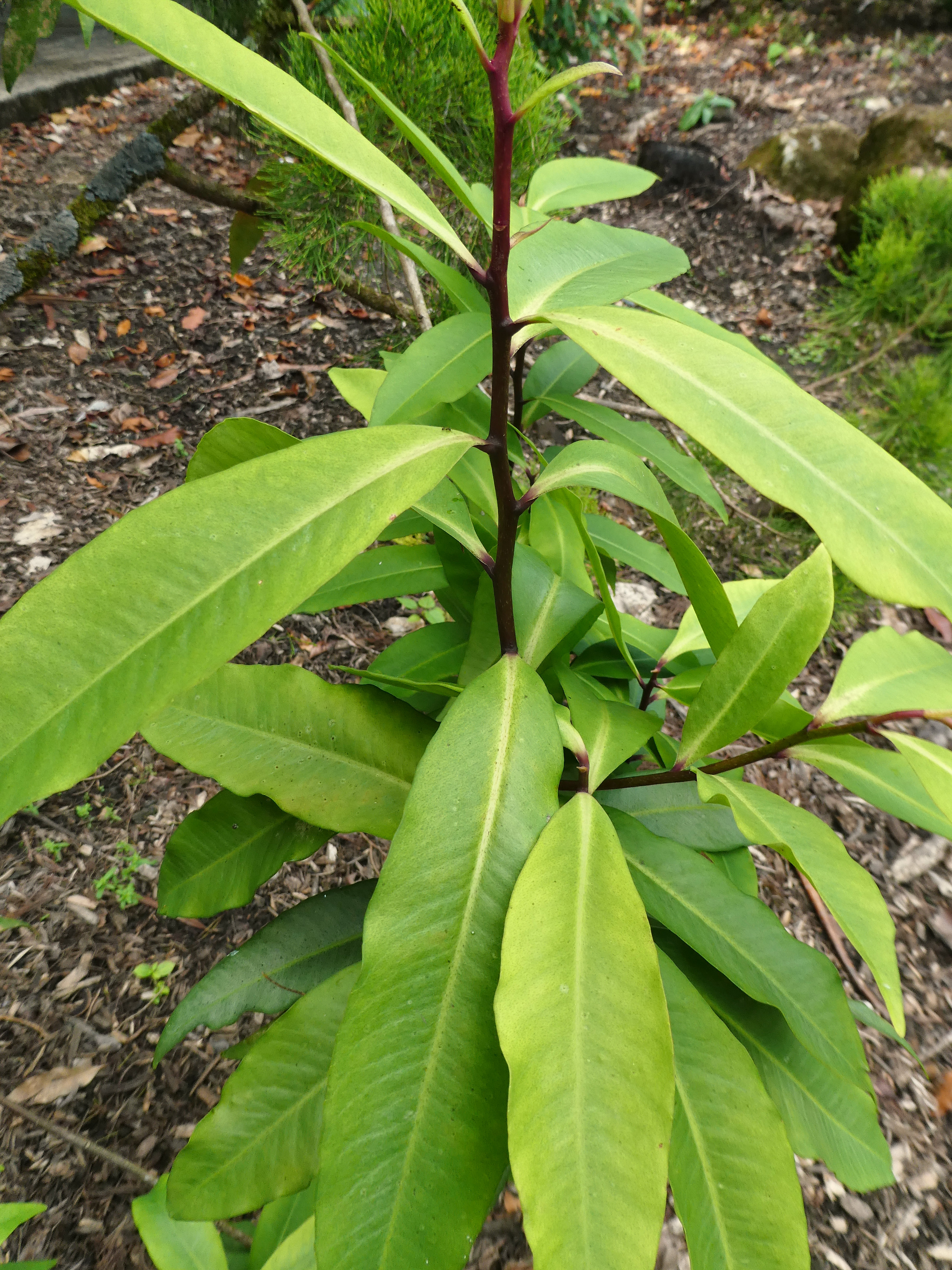
Habit, at Cairns Botanic Gardens

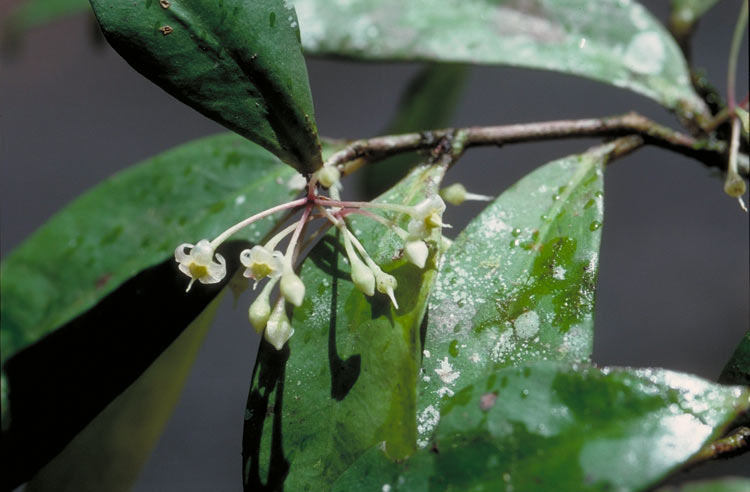
Flowers

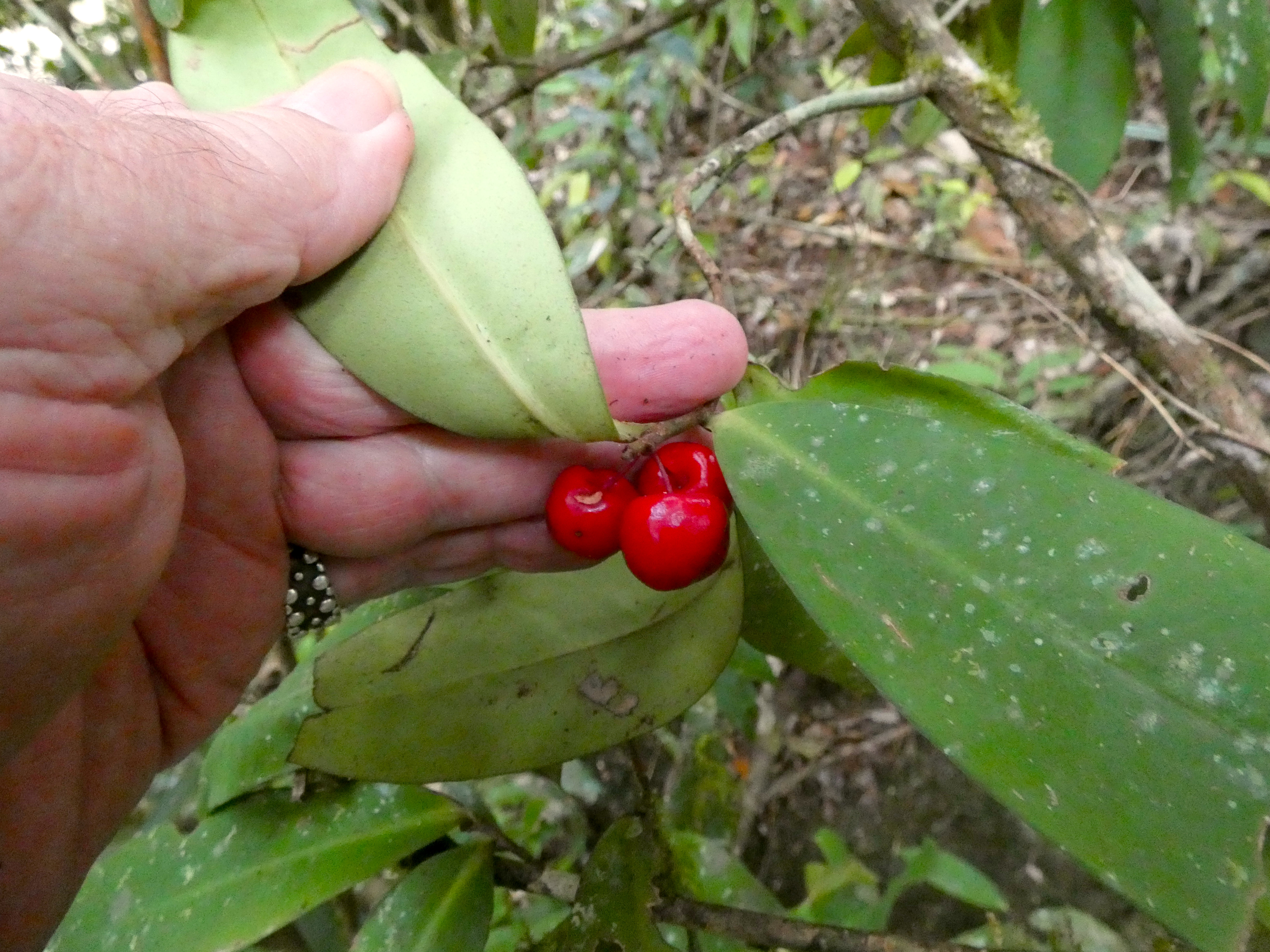
With fruit in Mossman Gorge

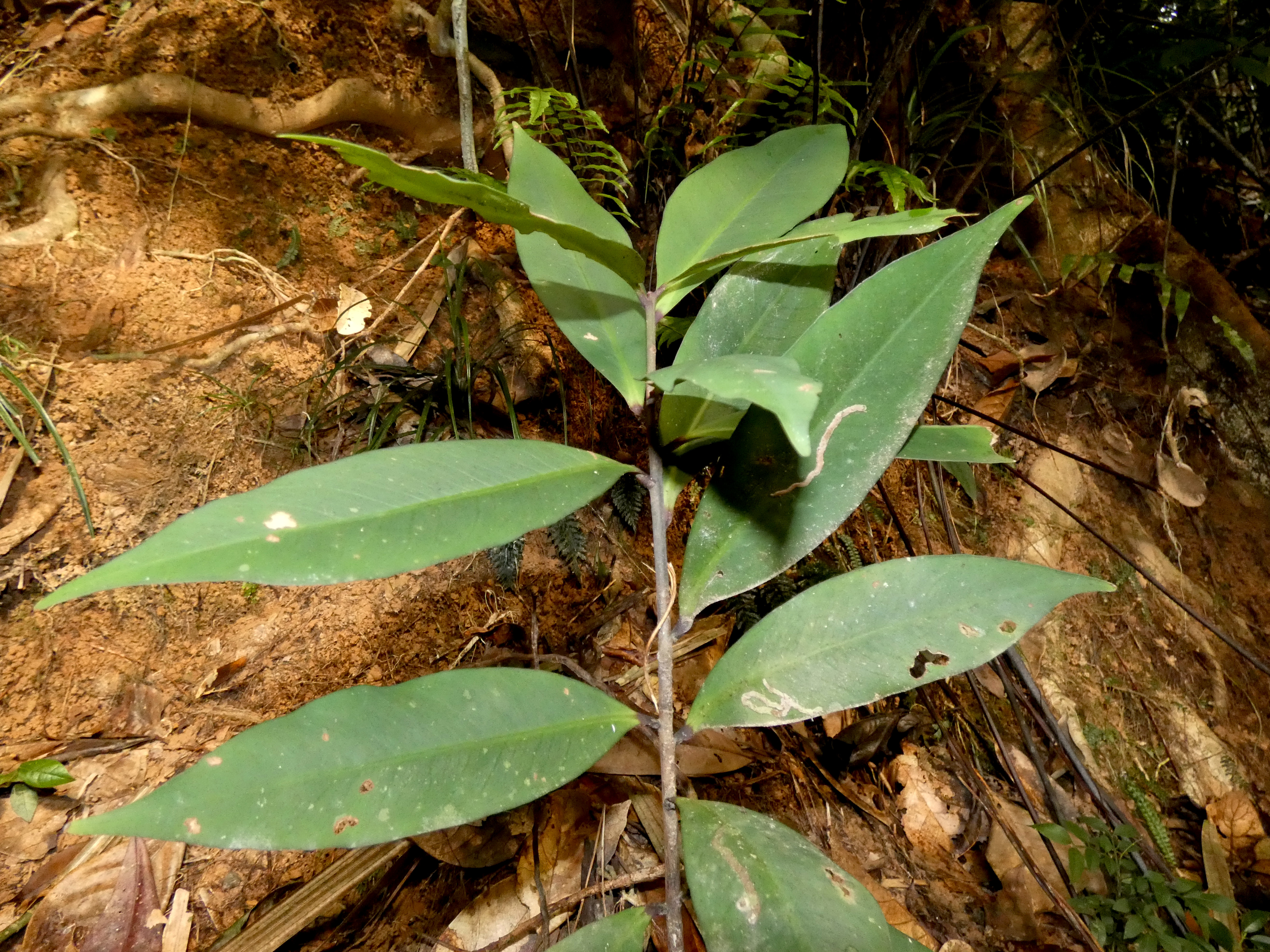
Foliage
