= Australian Tropical Rainforest Plants =

Botanical identification key

- Website type: Botanical identification key
- Available in: English
- Headquarters: Atherton, {{{location_country}}}
- Key people: Frank A. Zich, B.P.M. Hyland, Trevor Whiffin, Raelee A. Kerrigan (Edition 8)
- Website: https://apps.lucidcentral.org/rainforest/text/intro/index.html
- Commercial: No
- Launched: December 2010

Australian Tropical Rainforest Plants, also known as RFK, is an identification key giving details—including images, taxonomy, descriptions, range, habitat, and other information—of almost all species of flowering plants (i.e. trees, shrubs, vines, forbs, grasses and sedges, epiphytes, palms and pandans) found in tropical rainforests of Australia, with the exception of most orchids which are treated in a separate key called Australian Tropical Rainforest Orchids (see External links section). A key for ferns is under development. RFK is a project initiated by the Australian botanist Bernie Hyland.

== History ==
The information system had its beginnings when Hyland started working for the Queensland Department of Forestry in the 1960s. It was during this time that he was tasked with the creation of an identification system for rainforest trees, but given no direction as to its format. Having little belief in single-access keys, he began work on creating a multi-access key (or polyclave) which would eventually become RFK. He discussed the project with Neil Harvey from the Department's Brisbane office and received considerable assistance from him. Harvey was able to take the raw data given him by Hyland and convert it (using a Fortran program he wrote himself) into a format that could be used to create a key using the then standard 80-column punched cards.

=== Early versions ===
These cards formed the basis of the key and were used in conjunction with a handbook. Edition 1 was published in 1972 and covered just 584 taxa, using 48 bark characteristics and 45 leaf characteristics to make an identification. Edition 2, published in 1983, expanded the number of taxa covered to 799, however this was almost the maximum capacity for the card-based system, and a new technology was required to expand it further.

=== Digitisation ===
In 1983 Hyland began a collaboration with Trevor Whiffin of La Trobe University, whom he had met in 1973, to expand the key even further. As well as planning for a computer version of the key, more species were added to the database as well as flower, fruit and seedling features and x-ray images of the leaves. This was a massive undertaking and Edition 3 was not completed until 1992, and released in November 1993 It was published on CD-ROMs, covered 1056 taxa, and was available for the public to buy and use on Windows and Mac computers. It is possibly the first computer-based identification key in the world. Edition 4 was published in 2000, followed by Edition 5 in 2003, both CD-roms, bringing the total number of species covered up to 2154.

=== Online access ===
In 2002 Bernie Hyland retired from the CSIRO where he then worked, but continued on as a CSIRO Honorary Research Fellow to continue to provide input to the project, which has since been headed by Frank Zich. The next milestone in its development was Edition 6 (published 2010), which was transferred to the Lucid software^{a} platform and released online for the first time, enabling free access to RFK for any interested person. It covered 2553 taxa and used 730 characteristics. Edition 7 added another 200 taxa and was published in 2018.

=== Current version ===
Edition 8 (published 2020) represents another significant technological step forward, being available as a mobile app for iOS and Android devices, as well as the online version. It now covers 2762 species, uses over 730 features to make identifications, and contains around 14,000 images.

== Notes ==
^aLucidcentral both hosts the development of multi-access and other keys, together with the many interactive biological keys developed using Lucid software.
