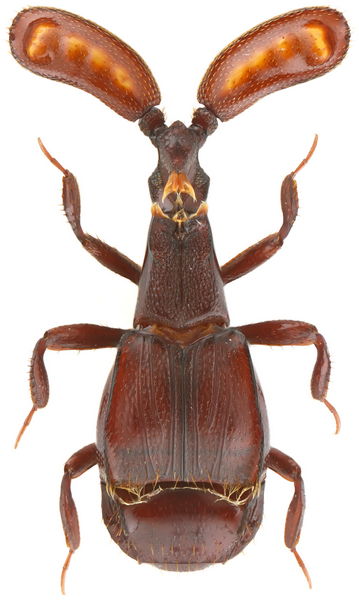
- Holotype hold in the Natural History Museum of Geneva

Scientific classification
- Kingdom: Animalia
- Phylum: Arthropoda
- Class: Insecta
- Order: Coleoptera
- Suborder: Polyphaga
- Infraorder: Staphyliniformia
- Family: Staphylinidae
- Genus: Colilodion
- Species: C. schulzi

Binomial name
- Colilodion schulzi Yin & Cuccodoro, 2016

= Colilodion schulzi =

Species of beetle

Colilodion schulzi is a species of beetles belonging to the family Staphylinidae. This small, robust, reddish-brown rove beetle is known from a single specimen, a 2.37 millimetres (0.093 in) long female. It resembles the species C. concinnus and C. inopinatus with its enlarged antennomeres III, but it is easily distinguished by the greater maximum width and less variable width of these appendages, and by other morphological characteristics. Although its ecology is unknown, the presence of trichomes and the knowledge of related species, such as Staphylinidae suggests that this insect is myrmecophilous. The holotype was collected in 2009 in Palawan (Philippines) while sifting plant debris in a coniferous forest. The species was described in 2016 by the coleopterists Zi-Wei Yin from Shanghai Normal University and Giulio Cuccodoro from the Natural History Museum of Geneva, where the type specimen is part of the collection. The taxon's specific denomination is dedicated to the German myrmecologist Andreas Schulz, collector of the specimen.

== Description ==
=== Morphology ===
The morphology of Colilodion schulzi is only known from its holotype, a female individual 2.37 mm long. The habitus is reddish-brown, and the pubescence is short and recumbent. The head is elongated, measuring 0.43 mm long and 0.34 mm wide. It is narrowed apically, with its summit convex as seen in profile and slightly below the level of the pronotum. The top of the head is roughly punctuated, the forehead as well but more sparsely and with a fine pubescence. Each compound eye consists of about 22 facets, and is divided by a lateral carina separating about 20 dorsal facets from two ventral ones. The antennae carry three articles, all visible dorsally and covered with short setae. The first two antennomeres are short, but the third is long (0.92 mm) and widely broadened (0.39 mm). The pronotum, 0.63 mm long, is trapezoidal, widening regularly towards the back. The elytra, wider than long, measure 0.73 mm by 0.95 mm, and are roughly punctuated and streaked longitudinally. The elytra bear long, thick golden bristles at their posterior margin. The abdomen is 0.58 mm long and 0.89 mm wide. The tibiae are constricted in their basal third, and bear conspicuous rows of erect setae on their dorsal side.

=== Similar species ===
In the genus Colilodion, C. schulzi resembles the species C. concinnus and C. inopinatus that share the enlarged antennomeres III with a flattened dorsal surface with smooth fields. These antennae are, however, widened over most of their length in C. schulzi, while they are distinctly narrowed at their base in the other two species. The pronotum of C. concinnus and C. inopinatus is also less stout and finely punctuated, the base of their elytra is narrower and the posterior border of the latter does not bear the golden setae that are present in C. schulzi.

== Ecology ==
Species of the supertribe Clavigeritae, including those of the genus Colilodion, are presumed to be myrmecophiles due to the presence of trichomes exuding appeasement pheromones favouring their adoption by ants. The most common ant genera in the type locality of Colilodion schulzi are Camponotus, Paratrechina, and some other genera of the subfamily Myrmicinae. The role of broadened antennomeres is unknown. Their compact form could be an adaptation to myrmecophily, perhaps preventing their breakage when the beetles are transported by the ants to their colony.

== Distribution and habitat ==
The species is only known from a single specimen found at the type locality (10°11′37″N 118°52′21″E), located between 500 metres (1,600 ft) and 700 metres (2,300 ft) above sea level on Mount Bloomfield in Sabang, a small village of Palawan, an island of the Philippines. The site on a hill top is climatologically quite dry and hot and characterised by a rocky surface. The holotype was collected during sifting of vegetable debris from a sparse coniferous forest.

== Systematics ==
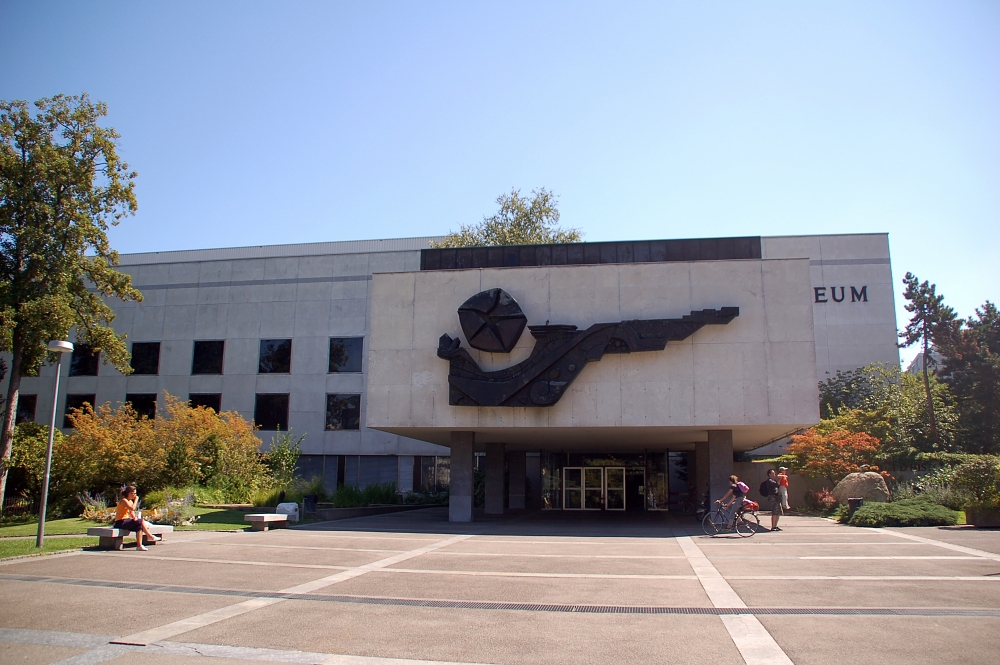
The entrance of the Natural History Museum of Geneva, that holds the type material of Colilodion schulzi

The species is described in 2016 by the coleopterists Zi-Wei Yin, from the Shanghai Normal University, and Giulio Cuccodoro, from the Natural History Museum of Geneva, on the basis of a single specimen. This holotype, housed in the Swiss institution, is a female collected on December 10, 2009, by the German myrmecologist Andreas Schulz, to whom the descriptors dedicated the specific epithet, schulzi. Colilodion schulzi joins the seven species already described in the genus Colilodion. Its description is published in the Revue suisse de Zoologie, along with photographs of habitat for all of the eight species of the genus and a dichotomous identification key for them. The exact systematic placement of the genus remains uncertain; it is the only member of the Colilodionini tribe, sharing certain characteristics with Clavigeritae, where it was originally placed by Claude Besuchet in 1991, and others that resemble the Pselaphitae.

== In the culture ==
In January 2017, Colilodion schulzi is named "species of the year 2017 of the Swiss Systematics Society", among 153 species described by Swiss researchers during the year 2016. For the nonce, members of the genus Colilodion are designated under the name of "rabbit beetles".

== Bibliography ==
- Yin, Zi-Wei; Cuccodoro, Giulio (2016). "Colilodion schulzi sp. n. (Coleoptera: Staphylinidae: Pselaphinae) from Palawan, the Philippines, with habitus photographs and a revised key to all Colilodion species". Revue suisse de Zoologie. 123 (1): 153–158. doi:10.5281/zenodo.46295. S2CID 229232179.
- Société suisse de systématique (January 16, 2017). "Un coléoptère à oreilles de lapin, espèce de l'année 2017 de la SSS" (in French).
