= Single-access key =

Branching identification key

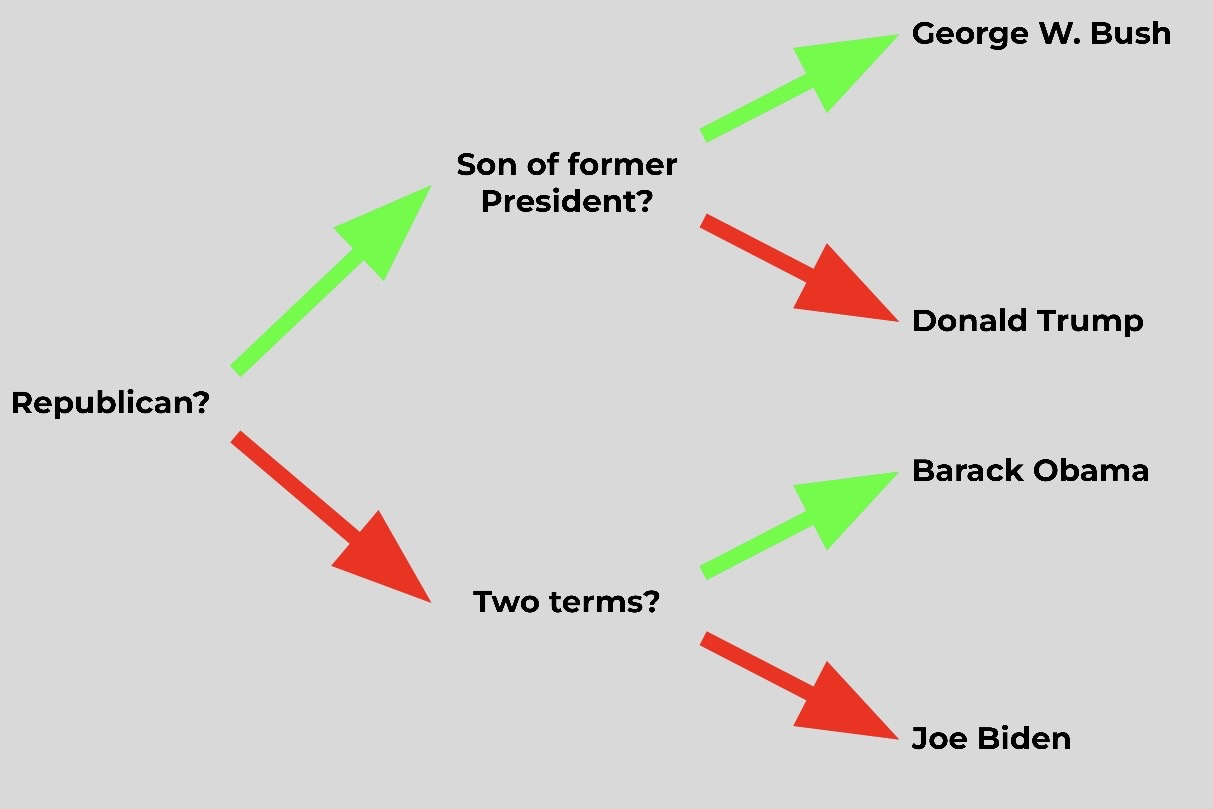
Single-access key of U.S. presidents elected after 2000

A single-access key (also called dichotomous key, sequential key, analytical key, or pathway key) is an identification key where the sequence and structure of identification steps is fixed by the author of the key. At each point in the decision process, multiple alternatives are offered, each leading to a result or a further choice. The alternatives are commonly called "leads", and the set of leads at a given point a "couplet".

Single access keys are closely related to decision trees and binary search trees. However, to improve the usability and reliability of keys, many single-access keys incorporate reticulation, changing the tree structure into a directed acyclic graph. Single-access keys have been in use for several hundred years. They may be printed in various styles (e. g., linked, nested, indented, graphically branching) or used as interactive, computer-aided keys. In the latter case, either a longer part of the key may be displayed (optionally hyperlinked), or only a single question may be displayed at a time.

If the key has several choices it is described as polychotomous or polytomous. If the entire key consists of exactly two choices at each branching point, the key is called dichotomous. The majority of single-access keys are dichotomous.

== Diagnostic ('artificial') versus synoptic ('natural') keys ==
Any single-access key organizes a large set of items into a structure that breaks them down into smaller, more accessible subsets, with many keys leading to the smallest available classification unit (a species or infraspecific taxon typically in the form of binomial nomenclature). However, a trade-off exists between keys that concentrate on making identification most convenient and reliable (diagnostic keys), and keys which aim to reflect the scientific classification of organisms (synoptic keys). The first type of keys limits the choice of characteristics to those most reliable, convenient, and available under certain conditions. Multiple diagnostic keys may be offered for the same group of organisms: Diagnostic keys may be designed for field (field guides) or laboratory use, for summer or winter use, and they may use geographic distribution or habitat preference of organisms as accessory characteristics. They do so at the expense of creating artificial groups in the key.

An example of a diagnostic key is shown below. It is not based on the taxonomic classification of the included species — compare with the botanical classification of oaks.

In contrast, synoptic keys follow the taxonomic classification as close as possible. Where the classification is already based on phylogenetic studies, the key represents the evolutionary relationships within the group. To achieve this, these keys often have to use more difficult characteristics, which may not always be available in the field, and which may require instruments like a hand lens or microscope. Because of convergent evolution, superficially similar species may be separated early in the key, with superficially different, but genetically closely related species being separated much later in the key. Synoptic keys are typically found in scientific treatments of a taxonomic group ("monographs").

An example of a synoptic key (corresponding to the diagnostic key shown below) is shown further below. In plants, flower and fruit characteristics often are important for primary taxonomic classification:

Example of a diagnostic dichotomous key for some eastern United States oaks based on leaf characteristics

1. Leaves usually without teeth or lobes: 2
1. Leaves usually with teeth or lobes: 5

2. Leaves evergreen: 3
2. Leaves not evergreen: 4

3. Mature plant a large tree — southern live oak Quercus virginiana
3. Mature plant a small shrub — dwarf live oak Quercus minima

4. Leaf narrow, about 4-6 times as long as broad — willow oak Quercus phellos
4. Leaf broad, about 2-3 times as long as broad — shingle oak Quercus imbricaria

5. Lobes or teeth bristle-tipped: 6
5. Lobes or teeth rounded or blunt-pointed, no bristles: 7

6. Leaves mostly with 3 lobes — blackjack oak Quercus marilandica
6. Leaves mostly with 7-9 lobes — northern red oak Quercus rubra

7. Leaves with 5-9 deep lobes — white oak Quercus alba
7. Leaves with 21-27 shallow lobes — swamp chestnut oak Quercus prinus

This key first differentiates between oaks with entire leaves with normally smooth margins (live oaks, willow oak, shingle oak), and other oaks with lobed or toothed leaves. The following steps created smaller and smaller groups (e. g., red oak, white oak), until the species has been keyed out.

Example of a synoptic (taxonomic) dichotomous key for some eastern United States oaks, reflecting taxonomic classification

1. Styles short; acorns mature in 6 months, sweet or slightly bitter, inside of acorn shell hairless (Quercus sect. Quercus, white oaks): 2
1. Styles long, acorns mature in 18 months, very bitter, inside of acorn shell woolly (Quercus sect. Lobatae, red oaks): 5

2. Leaves evergreen: 3
2. Leaves not evergreen: 4

3. Mature plant a large tree — southern live oak Quercus virginiana
3. Mature plant a small shrub — dwarf live oak Quercus minima

4. Leaves with 5-9 deep lobes — white oak Quercus alba
4. Leaves with 21-27 shallow lobes — Swamp chestnut oak Quercus prinus

5. Leaves usually without teeth or lobes: 6
5. Leaves usually with teeth or lobes: 7

6. Leaf narrow, about 4-6 times as long as broad — Willow oak Quercus phellos
6. Leaf broad, about 2-3 times as long as broad — Shingle oak Quercus imbricaria

7. Leaves mostly with 3 lobes — Blackjack oak Quercus marilandica
7. Leaves mostly with 7-9 lobes — Northern red oak Quercus rubra

== Structural variants of single-access keys ==
The distinction between dichotomous (bifurcating) and polytomous (multifurcating) keys is a structural one, and identification key software may or may not support polytomous keys. This distinction is less arbitrary than it may appear. Allowing a variable number of choices is disadvantageous in the nested display style, where for each couplet in a polytomous key the entire key must be scanned to the end to determine whether more than a second lead may exist or not. Furthermore, if the alternative lead statements are complex (involving more than one characteristic and possibly "and", "or", or "not"), two alternative statements are significantly easier to understand than couplets with more alternatives. However, the latter consideration can easily be accommodated in a polytomous key where couplets based on a single characteristic may have more than two choices, and complex statements may be limited to two alternative leads.

Another structural distinction is whether only lead statements or question-answer pairs are supported. Most traditional single-access keys use the "lead-style", where each option consists of a statement, only one of which is correct. Especially computer-aided keys occasionally use the "question-answer-style" instead, where a question is presented with a choice of answers. The second style is well known from multiple choice testing and therefore more intuitive for beginners. However, it creates problems when multiple characteristics need to be combined in a single step (as in "Flower red and spines present" versus "Flowers yellow to reddish-orange, spines absent").

Lead style

1. Flowers red ... 2
Flowers white ... 3
Flowers blue ... 4

Question-answer-style

1. What is the flower color?
- red ... 2
- white ... 3
- blue ... 4

== Presentation styles ==
Single-access keys may be presented in different styles. The two most frequently encountered styles are the

- Nested style in which all couplets immediately follow their lead, at the expense of separating the leads within a couplet.
  - The most frequent subtype of nested keys are called "indented key", where indentation increases with each level. With a large key this can lead to much whitespace in print, and consequently little remaining room for lead text and illustrations. Although "indented key" is sometimes used as a synonym for nested key, the indentation itself is not an essential feature of a nested key. (Examples of non-hyperlinked, indented nested keys may be found at www.env.gov.bc.ca)
- Linked style: The leads within a couplet immediately follow each other, making polytomous keys easy to achieve. At the end of each lead some form of pointer (a numbering system, hyperlinks, etc.) create the connection to the couplets that follow this lead.

The nested style gives an excellent overview over the structure of the key. With a short key and moderate indentation it can be easy to follow and even backtrace an erroneous identification path. The nested style is problematic with polytomous keys, where each key must be scanned to the end to verify that no further leads exist within a couplet. It also does not easily support reticulation (which requires a link method similar to the one used in the linked style).

== Advantages and disadvantages ==
A large amount of knowledge about reliable and efficient identification procedures may be incorporated in good single-access keys. Characteristics that are reliable and convenient to observe most of the time and for most species (or taxa), and which further provide a well-balanced key (the leads splitting number of species evenly) will be preferred at the start of the key. However, in practice it is difficult to achieve this goal for all taxa in all conditions. If the information for a given identification step is not available, several potential leads must be followed and identification becomes increasingly difficult.

Although software exists that helps in skipping questions in a single-access key, the more general solution to this problem is the construction and use of multi-access keys, allowing a free choice of identification steps and are easily adaptable to different taxa (e.g., very small or very large) as well as different circumstances of identification (e. g., in the field or laboratory).

== See also ==
- Multi-access key
