= Odontocynips nebulosa =

Scientific classification
- Kingdom: Animalia
- Phylum: Arthropoda
- Clade: Pancrustacea
- Class: Insecta
- Order: Hymenoptera
- Family: Cynipidae
- Genus: Odontocynips
- Species: O. nebulosa

Binomial name
- Odontocynips nebulosa Bassett, 1881

Species of wasp

Odontocynips nebulosa is a species of cynipid wasp that induces large, woody, subterranean galls on the roots of oaks.

For many years, this species was incorrectly associated with a common, mealy-white gall found on oak leaves; however, that gall is now known to be induced by a different, undescribed species.

== Description ==
The adult wasp is small and rarely observed. The galls are the most common sign of its presence. They form on the roots of young oak shoots, sometimes 5–10 cm underground. Single galls are globular and 10–13 mm in diameter, but they are often aggregated into irregular, lobed, polythalamous (many-chambered) masses that can be as large as 8 cm in diameter. When fresh, they are covered with smooth, light-colored bark similar to the host root, and they become hard and woody when dry. The internal larval cavities are 6–8 mm in diameter.

== Range ==
The wasp is found across the southeastern and central United States, with its range extending from Florida to Texas and north to Missouri and Arkansas.

== Habitat ==
This species is found on the tangled roots of young oak shoots growing in dense thickets where humus has accumulated.

== Ecology and life cycle ==
Odontocynips nebulosa requires an oak as a host. Known host species include Quercus chapmanii, Quercus fusiformis, Quercus geminata, Quercus lyrata, Quercus minima, Quercus stellata, and Quercus virginiana.

The female wasp lays her eggs in the root tissue of the host oak. Chemical secretions from the developing larva stimulate the oak to form the gall, which serves as both a source of food and protection. The life cycle may take two years to complete. Galls collected in the fall have been found to contain pupae in October and mature adults later that month. Adults emerge from the galls in late winter to early spring, between February and March.

== Taxonomy and misidentification ==
The species was first described by the American entomologist Homer Franklin Bassett in 1881 as Cynips q. nebulosa. Bassett's description was based on a gall from Florida covered with a "mealy-white substance", which he believed was a leaf gall. However, his type specimens were lost and never re-examined.

Later work by entomologist L.H. Weld clarified that the species actually creates a large subterranean root gall. In his 1957 book Cynipid Galls of the Western United States, Weld concluded that Bassett's original specimen was likely a root gall that had been mislabeled as coming from a leaf. Therefore, the name Odontocynips nebulosa correctly applies only to the root gall wasp. The common "mealy oak gall" found on leaves is induced by an as-yet-undescribed species.

The specific epithet, nebulosa, is Latin for "cloudy," a name Bassett chose to describe the white, mealy coating on the gall he observed.
