= Ambrosiger =

Scientific classification
- Kingdom: Animalia
- Phylum: Arthropoda
- Clade: Pancrustacea
- Class: Insecta
- Order: Coleoptera
- Suborder: Polyphaga
- Infraorder: Staphyliniformia
- Family: Staphylinidae
- Subfamily: Pselaphinae
- Supertribe: Clavigeritae
- Tribe: Clavigerini
- Genus: Ambrosiger; Silvestri, 1926
- Species: A. gravis

Binomial name
- Ambrosiger gravis Silvestri, 1926<

Genus of beetles

Ambrosiger is a genus of ant-loving beetles in the family Staphylinidae. There is one known extant species, Ambrosiger gravis.
