= Branching identification key =

A branching identification key within taxonomy (the practice and science of categorization or classification), is a presentation form of a single-access key where the structure of the decision tree is displayed graphically as a branching structure, involving lines between items. Depending on the number of branches at a single point, a branching key may be dichotomous or polytomous.

In a diagnostic key, the branching structure of the key should not be mistaken for a phylogenetic or cladistic branching pattern.

All single-access keys form a decision tree (or graph if reticulation exists), and thus all such keys have a branching structure. "Branching key" may therefore occasionally be used as a synonym for single-access key.

== Examples of branching presentations ==
- Figure 19.5 in
- Page 8 in.
