= KeyBase =

KeyBase is a database and web application for managing and deploying interactive taxonomic keys for plants and animals developed by the Royal Botanic Gardens Victoria. KeyBase provides a medium where pathway keys which were traditionally developed for print and other classical types of media, can be used more effectively in the internet environment. The platform uses a concept called "keys" which can be easily linked together, joined with other keys, or merged into larger other seamless keys groups, with each still available to be browsed independently. Keys in the KeyBase database can be filtered and displayed in a variety of ways, filters, and formats.
