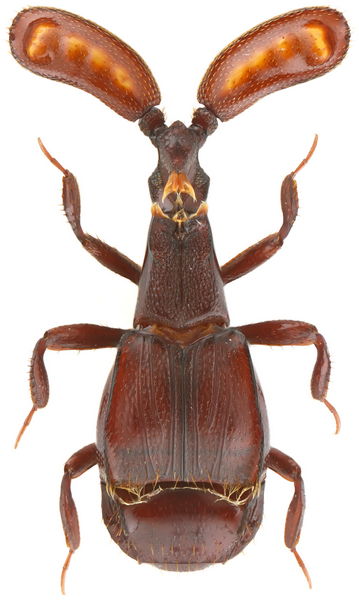
- Holotype of Colilodion schulzi deposited in the Natural History Museum of Geneva.

Scientific classification
- Domain: Eukaryota
- Kingdom: Animalia
- Phylum: Arthropoda
- Class: Insecta
- Order: Coleoptera
- Suborder: Polyphaga
- Infraorder: Staphyliniformia
- Family: Staphylinidae
- Subfamily: Pselaphinae
- Supertribe: Clavigeritae
- Tribe: Colilodionini; Besuchet, 1991
- Genus: Colilodion; Besuchet, 1991

= Colilodion =

Genus of beetles

Colilodion, sole member of the tribe Colilodionini, is a genus of beetles belonging to the family Staphylinidae and comprising eight species from Southeast Asia.

== Ecology ==
Species of the genus Colilodion are presumed to be myrmecophiles due to the presence of trichomes retaining ant pheromones.

== Systematics ==
The exact systematic placement of the genus remains uncertain; it is the only member of the Colilodionini tribe, sharing certain characteristics with Clavigeritae, where it was originally placed by Claude Besuchet in 1991, and others that resemble the Pselaphitae. Eight species have been described:

- Colilodion concinnus Besuchet, 1991
- Colilodion incredibilis Besuchet, 1991
- Colilodion inopinatus Besuchet, 1991
- Colilodion mirus Besuchet, 1991
- Colilodion schulzi Yin & Cuccodoro, 2016
- Colilodion tetramerus Löbl, 1998
- Colilodion thienmu Nomura & Sugaya, 2007
- Colilodion wuesti Löbl, 1994

== Bibliography ==
- Besuchet, Claude (1991). "Révolution chez les Clavigerinae (Coleoptera, Pselaphidae)". Revue suisse de Zoologie (in French). 98 (3): 499–515. doi:10.5962/bhl.part.79801.
