= Lineage (evolution) =

Sequence of populations, organisms, cells, or genes that form a line of descent

An evolutionary lineage is a temporal series of populations, organisms, cells, or genes connected by a continuous line of descent from ancestor to descendant. Lineages are subsets of the evolutionary tree of life. Lineages are often determined by the techniques of molecular systematics.

== Phylogenetic representation of lineages ==
A rooted tree of life into three ancient monophyletic lineages: bacteria, archaea, and eukaryotes based on rRNA genes

Lineages are typically visualized as subsets of a phylogenetic tree. A lineage is a single line of descent or linear chain within the tree, while a clade is a (usually branched) monophyletic group, containing a single ancestor and all its descendants. Phylogenetic trees are typically created from DNA, RNA or protein sequence data. Apart from this, morphological differences and similarities have been, and still are used to create phylogenetic trees. Sequences from different individuals are collected and their similarity is quantified. Mathematical procedures are used to cluster individuals by similarity.

Members of a species are considered to evolve as a single unit (or lineage) when they repeatedly share the same genes. The nodes would represent a split in lineage due to a breaking of genetic connections: when a single lineage is divided into two subsets, with the individuals not exchanging genes, they will accumulate differences in genes. If they do not fuse back again, it will create a new distinct descendant clade.

Just as a map is a scaled approximation of true geography, a phylogenetic tree is an approximation of the true complete evolutionary relationships. For example, in a full tree of life, the entire clade of animals can be collapsed to a single branch of the tree. However, this is merely a limitation of rendering space. In theory, a true and complete tree for all living organisms or for any DNA sequence could be generated.

Nevertheless, phylogenies can sometimes appear in a non-treelike form. Branches on the tree of life may grow together, a phenomenon called reticulation, which occurs due to different biological processes. Another process, introgression, occurs when hybrids between distinct lineages transfer novel genetic material through subsequent crossing. In other cases, hybrid speciation takes place when lineages hybridize to form a new, distinct lineage. Horizontal gene transfer, involving the introgression of very few genes, usually appears as a treelike population history with some genes having a discordant history. Thus, the tree-like representation would be proper as long as introgression and hybrid speciation are rare or limited to closely related tips (of lineages). In some cases, evolutionary relantionships should be depicted better in the form of a network.

== Lineages with sexual reproduction ==
Most species of multicellular plants, animals and fungi reproduce sexually as do many protists. Therefore, the evolution of the lineages of such species has likely been substantially influenced by sexual interactions. In the fossil record, lineages with the capability for sexual reproduction first appeared about 2.0 billion years ago in the Proterozoic Eon, although a later date, 1.2 billion years ago has also been proposed. Lineages of sexually reproducing eukaryotic organisms may have evolved from a single-celled common ancestor.

== See also ==
- Clade
- Linnaean taxonomy
