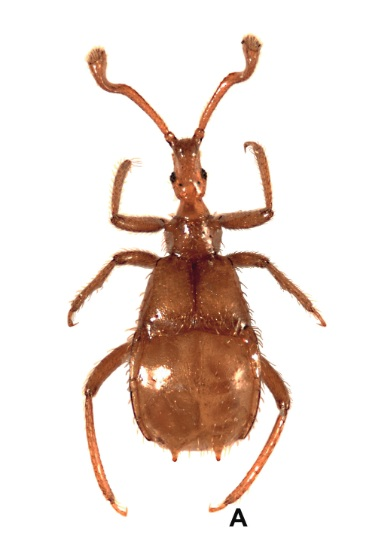

Scientific classification
- Kingdom: Animalia
- Phylum: Arthropoda
- Class: Insecta
- Order: Coleoptera
- Suborder: Polyphaga
- Infraorder: Staphyliniformia
- Family: Staphylinidae
- Genus: Apoderiger
- Species: A. torticornis

Binomial name
- Apoderiger torticornis Jeannel, 1960

Synonyms
- Apoderiger cervinus torticornis Jeannel, 1960

= Apoderiger torticornis =

Species of beetle

Apoderiger torticornis is a species of beetle in the family Staphylinidae. This species is found in Madagascar (Antongila Bay).

Adults reach a length of about 1.85–1.90 mm and have a yellowish-brown body.

The host ant of this species is Paratrechina amblyops rubescens.
