= Apoderiger cervinus =

Scientific classification
- Kingdom: Animalia
- Phylum: Arthropoda
- Class: Insecta
- Order: Coleoptera
- Suborder: Polyphaga
- Infraorder: Staphyliniformia
- Family: Staphylinidae
- Genus: Apoderiger
- Species: A. cervinus

Binomial name
- Apoderiger cervinus Wasmann, 1897

Species of beetle

Apoderiger cervinus is a species of beetle of the Staphylinidae family. This species is found in Madagascar (Imerina Plateau).

Adults reach a length of about 1.73 mm and have a yellowish-brown body.

The host ant of this species is Paratrechina amblyops rubescens.
