= Apoderiger sikorai =

Scientific classification
- Kingdom: Animalia
- Phylum: Arthropoda
- Class: Insecta
- Order: Coleoptera
- Suborder: Polyphaga
- Infraorder: Staphyliniformia
- Family: Staphylinidae
- Genus: Apoderiger
- Species: A. sikorai

Binomial name
- Apoderiger sikorai Hlaváč, 2025

Species of beetle

Apoderiger sikorai is a species of beetle of the Staphylinidae family. This species is found in Madagascar (Anjozorobe-Andasibe massif).

Adults reach a length of about 1.70–1.80 mm and have a yellowish-brown body.

== Etymology ==
The species is named after the collector of the type serie, Mr Sikora.
