= Protoclaviger =

Protoclaviger Temporal range: Eocene, 52 Ma

Scientific classification
- Kingdom: Animalia
- Phylum: Arthropoda
- Class: Insecta
- Order: Coleoptera
- Suborder: Polyphaga
- Infraorder: Staphyliniformia
- Family: Staphylinidae
- Subfamily: Pselaphinae
- Supertribe: Clavigeritae
- Tribe: †Protoclavigerini
- Genus: †Protoclaviger; Parker and Grimaldi, 2014
- Species: †P. trichodens

Binomial name
- †Protoclaviger trichodens Parker and Grimaldi, 2014

Genus of beetles

Protoclaviger is an extinct Early Eocene transitional fossil myrmecophile of the rove beetle subfamily Pselaphinae, and a stem group of the modern supertribe Clavigeritae, of which Claviger is a representative. All modern Clavigeritae are morphologically specialized obligate colony parasites of ant nests, soliciting food via trophallaxis from worker ants, and preying on the nest brood.

The amber-embedded holotype specimen of the single species, Protoclaviger trichodens, was recovered from a piece of 52 million-year-old Cambay amber from Gujarat, India. P. trichodens differs to modern Clavigeritae in its possession of a segmented dorsal abdomen; in extant species, the abdominal tergites are fused into single large segment. P. trichodens also possesses 8 antennal segments and mouthparts that extend outside the oral cavity, whereas modern species have between 3 and 6 antennal segments, and mouthparts that are contained within the oral cavity.

Protoclaviger is believed to represent an intermediate stage in the evolution of morphological specialization that adapted modern Clavigeritae to life inside ant colonies. Its discovery in Cambay amber, which holds one of the earliest diverse assemblages of modern ant subfamilies, indicates that the ant-beetle symbiosis is evolutionarily ancient.
