= Articerodes jariyae =

Scientific classification
- Kingdom: Animalia
- Phylum: Arthropoda
- Class: Insecta
- Order: Coleoptera
- Suborder: Polyphaga
- Infraorder: Staphyliniformia
- Family: Staphylinidae
- Genus: Articerodes
- Species: A. jariyae

Binomial name
- Articerodes jariyae Nomura, Sakchoowong, and Chanpaisaeng, 2008

Species of beetle

Articerodes jariyae is a rove beetle discovered in Thailand in 2008. It was named for Professor Jariya Chanpaisaen, who collaborated on the study that located it. It is closely related to Articerodes ohmomoi and Articerodes thailandicus, discovered during the same study.
