= Apoderiger =

Scientific classification
- Kingdom: Animalia
- Phylum: Arthropoda
- Clade: Pancrustacea
- Class: Insecta
- Order: Coleoptera
- Suborder: Polyphaga
- Infraorder: Staphyliniformia
- Family: Staphylinidae
- Tribe: Clavigerini
- Genus: Apoderiger; Wasmann, 1897

Synonyms
- Soalala Dajoz, 1982

Genus of beetles

Apoderiger is a genus of ant-loving beetles in the family Staphylinidae.

== Species ==
- Apoderiger banari Hlaváč, 2025
- Apoderiger cervinus Wasmann, 1897
- Apoderiger grandis Hlaváč, 2025
- Apoderiger sikorai Hlaváč, 2025
- Apoderiger spinosus (Dajoz, 1982)
- Apoderiger torticornis Jeannel, 1960
