= Articerodes thailandicus =

Scientific classification
- Kingdom: Animalia
- Phylum: Arthropoda
- Clade: Pancrustacea
- Class: Insecta
- Order: Coleoptera
- Suborder: Polyphaga
- Infraorder: Staphyliniformia
- Family: Staphylinidae
- Genus: Articerodes
- Species: A. thailandicus

Binomial name
- Articerodes thailandicus Nomura, Sakchoowong, and Chanpaisaeng, 2008

Species of beetle

Articerodes thailandicus is a rove beetle discovered in Thailand in 2008. It was named for Thailand, where it was first discovered. It is closely related to Articerodes jariyae and Articerodes ohmomoi, discovered during the same study.
