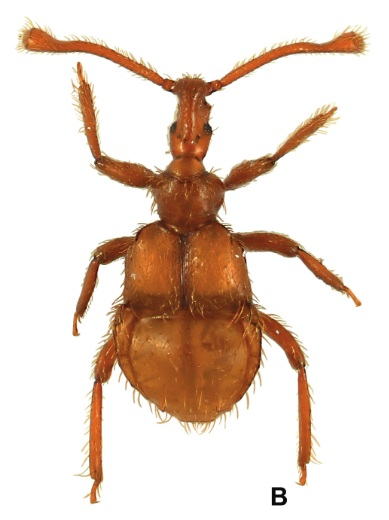

Scientific classification
- Kingdom: Animalia
- Phylum: Arthropoda
- Class: Insecta
- Order: Coleoptera
- Suborder: Polyphaga
- Infraorder: Staphyliniformia
- Family: Staphylinidae
- Genus: Apoderiger
- Species: A. banari

Binomial name
- Apoderiger banari Hlaváč, 2025

= Apoderiger banari =

Species of beetle

Apoderiger banari is a species of beetle of the Staphylinidae family. This species is found in Madagascar (Anjozorobe).

Adults reach a length of about 1.65–1.70 mm and have a yellowish-brown body.

== Etymology ==
The species is named after a good friend of the author, Peter Baňař, who collected many pselaphines in Madagascar.
