= Disarthricerini =

Scientific classification
- Kingdom: Animalia
- Phylum: Arthropoda
- Clade: Pancrustacea
- Class: Insecta
- Order: Coleoptera
- Suborder: Polyphaga
- Infraorder: Staphyliniformia
- Family: Staphylinidae
- Subfamily: Pselaphinae
- Supertribe: Clavigeritae
- Tribe: Disarthricerini; Jeannel, 1949

Tribe of beetles

Disarthricerini is a tribe of rove beetles in the supertribe Clavigeritae. It was first described by Jeannel in 1949. It contains two genera and 5 species.

== Genera and species ==
- Disarthricerus
  - Disarthricerus bruneicus
  - Disarthricerus dulcissimus
  - Disarthricerus integer
  - Disarthricerus moultoni
- Kurbatoviella
  - Kurbatoviella antennata
