= Tiracerini =

Scientific classification
- Kingdom: Animalia
- Phylum: Arthropoda
- Clade: Pancrustacea
- Class: Insecta
- Order: Coleoptera
- Suborder: Polyphaga
- Infraorder: Staphyliniformia
- Family: Staphylinidae
- Subfamily: Pselaphinae
- Supertribe: Clavigeritae
- Tribe: Tiracerini; Besuchet, 1986

Tribe of beetles

Tiracerini is a tribe of rove beetles in the supertribe Clavigeritae. It was first described by Besuchet in 1986. It contains 6 genera and 53 species.

== Genera ==
- Dzumaca
- Tiracaleda
- Tiracerus
- Tiramieua
- Tiraspirus
- Ziweia
