= Apoderiger spinosus =

Scientific classification
- Kingdom: Animalia
- Phylum: Arthropoda
- Clade: Pancrustacea
- Class: Insecta
- Order: Coleoptera
- Suborder: Polyphaga
- Infraorder: Staphyliniformia
- Family: Staphylinidae
- Genus: Apoderiger
- Species: A. spinosus

Binomial name
- Apoderiger spinosus (Dajoz, 1982)

Synonyms
- Soalala spinosa Dajoz, 1982

Species of beetle

Apoderiger spinosus is a species of beetle in the family Staphylinidae. This species is found in Madagascar (Soalala district).

Adults reach a length of about 1.40 mm and have a yellowish-brown body.
