= Articerodes ohmomoi =

Scientific classification
- Kingdom: Animalia
- Phylum: Arthropoda
- Class: Insecta
- Order: Coleoptera
- Suborder: Polyphaga
- Infraorder: Staphyliniformia
- Family: Staphylinidae
- Genus: Articerodes
- Species: A. ohmomoi

Binomial name
- Articerodes ohmomoi Nomura, Sakchoowong, and Chanpaisaeng, 2008

Species of beetle

Articerodes ohmomoi is a rove beetle discovered in Thailand in 2008. It was named for Dr. Sadahiro Ohmomo, a biochemistry professor at the University of Tsukuba, who collected the holotype for the species. It is closely related to Articerodes jariyae and Articerodes thailandicus, discovered during the same study.
