= Apoderiger grandis =

Scientific classification
- Kingdom: Animalia
- Phylum: Arthropoda
- Class: Insecta
- Order: Coleoptera
- Suborder: Polyphaga
- Infraorder: Staphyliniformia
- Family: Staphylinidae
- Genus: Apoderiger
- Species: A. grandis

Binomial name
- Apoderiger grandis Hlaváč, 2025

Species of beetle

Apoderiger grandis is a species of beetle of the Staphylinidae family. This species is found in Madagascar (Manongarivo Special Reserve).

Adults reach a length of about 2.20 mm and have a yellowish-brown body.

The host ant of this species is Paratrechina amblyops rubescens.

== Etymology ==
The species is named after the large size of the body.
