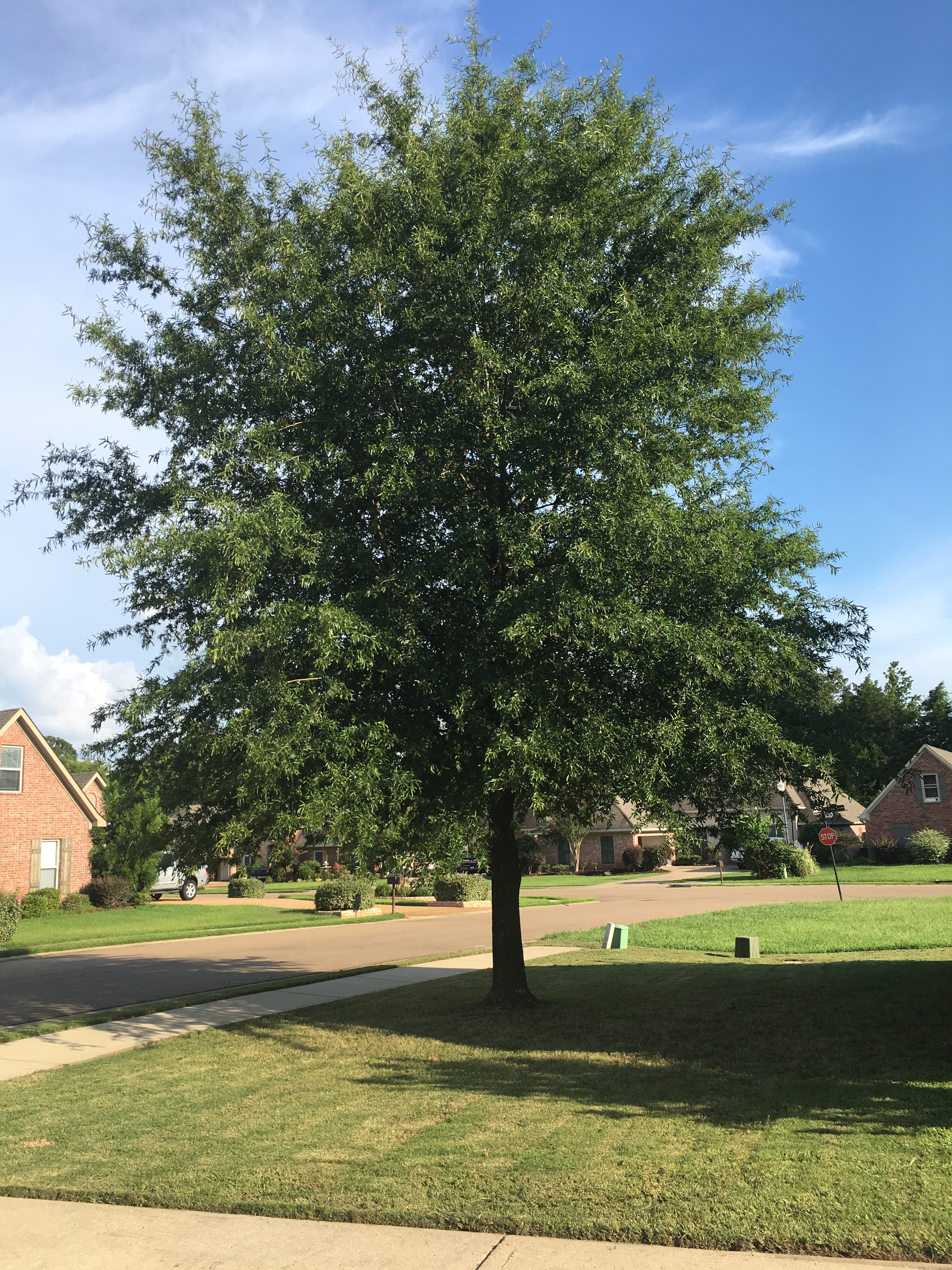
- Quercus phellos in Mississippi, United States

Conservation status
- Least Concern (IUCN 3.1)

- Secure (NatureServe)

Scientific classification
- Kingdom: Plantae
- Clade: Tracheophytes
- Clade: Angiosperms
- Clade: Eudicots
- Clade: Rosids
- Order: Fagales
- Family: Fagaceae
- Genus: Quercus
- Subgenus: Quercus subg. Quercus
- Section: Quercus sect. Lobatae
- Species: Q. phellos

Binomial name
- Quercus phellos L.
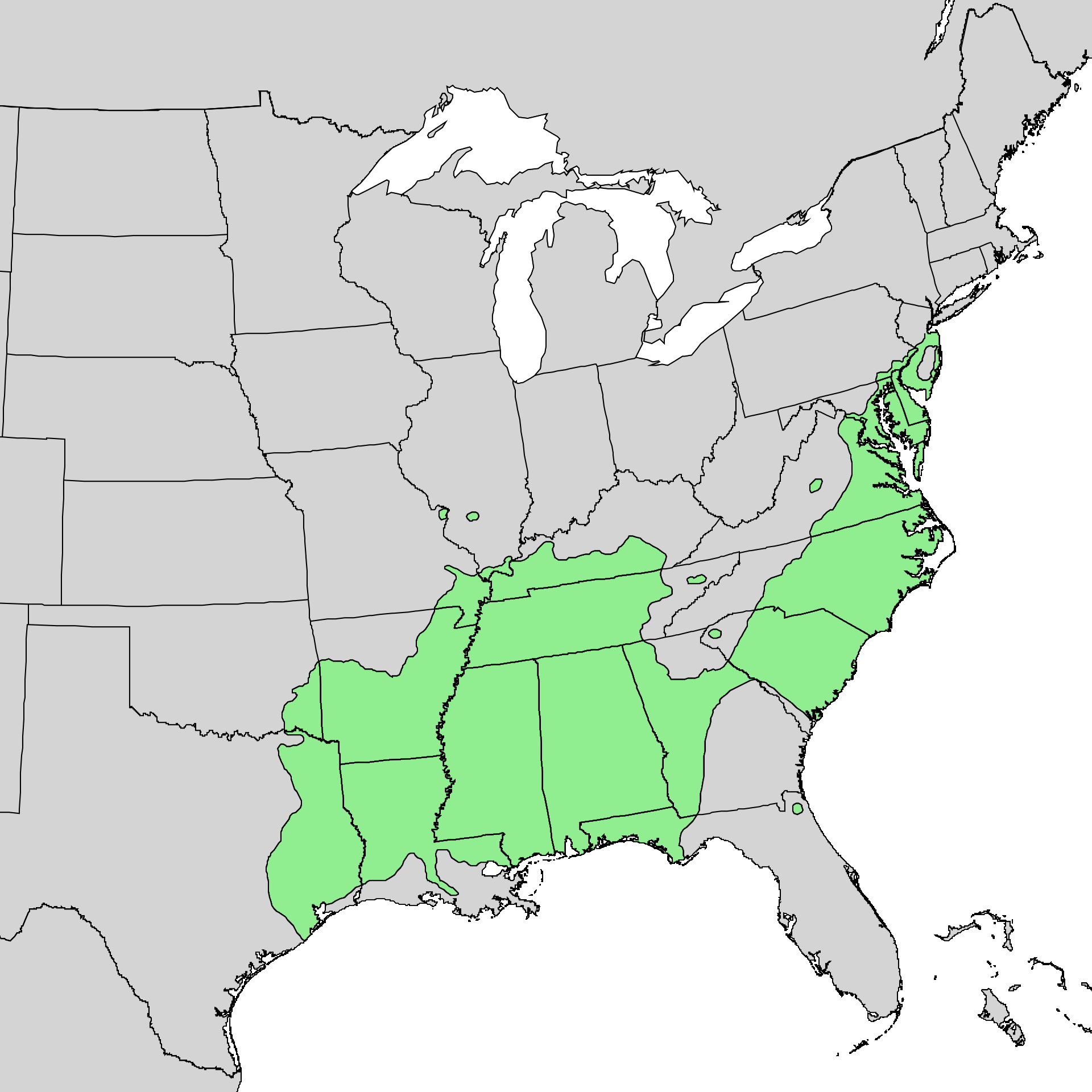

= Quercus phellos =

Willow oak

Species of oak tree

Quercus phellos, the willow oak, also peach oak, water oak, and swamp chestnut oak, is a North American species of deciduous tree in the red oak group of oaks. It is native to the south-central and eastern United States.

== Description ==
It is a medium-sized tree growing to 20–30 meters (65–100 feet) tall (exceptionally to 39 m, 128 ft), with a trunk up to 1–1.5 m (3 1/2–5 ft) in diameter (exceptionally 2 m or 6 1/2 ft).

=== Bark ===
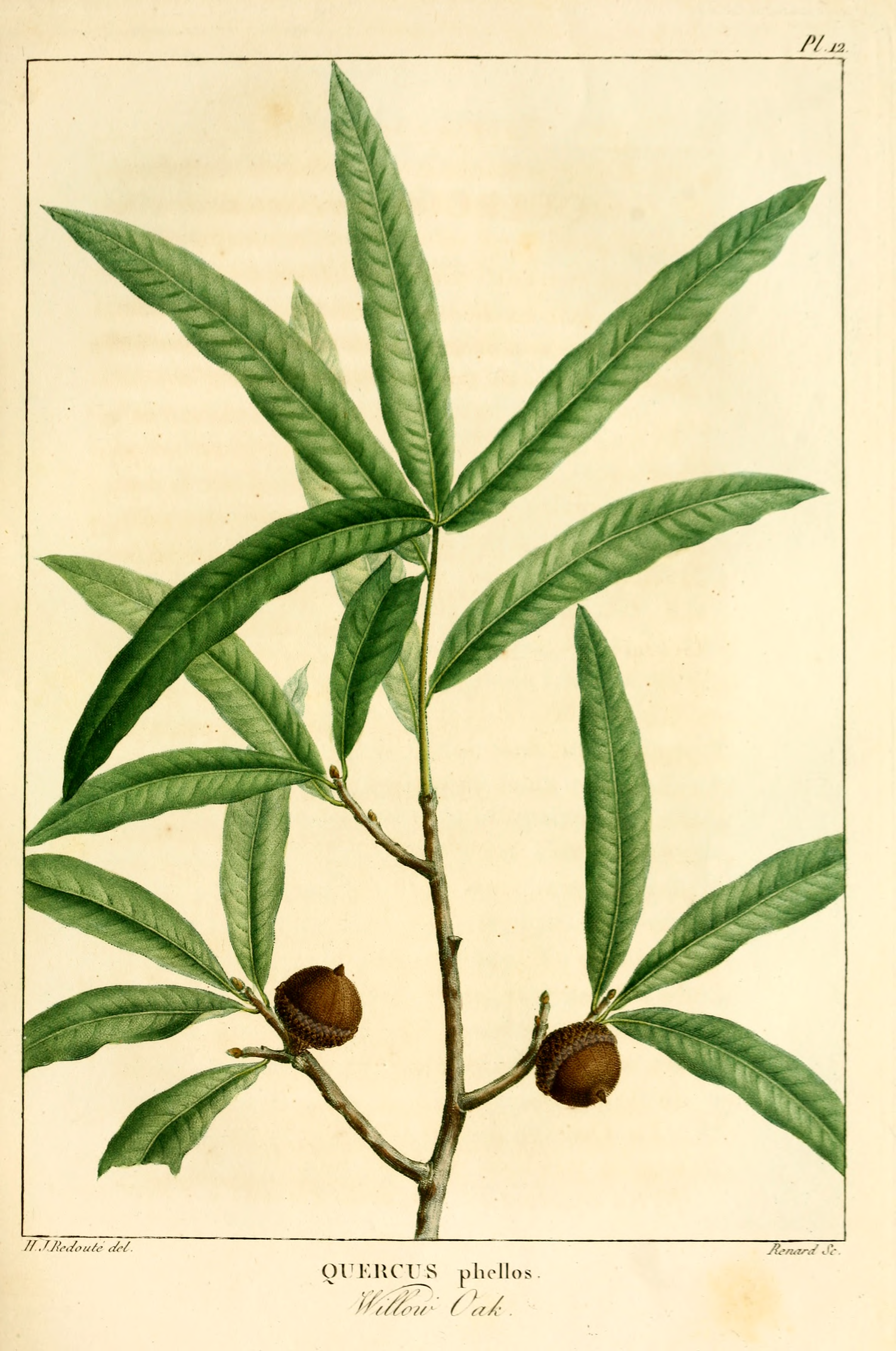
Branch with acorns and leaves

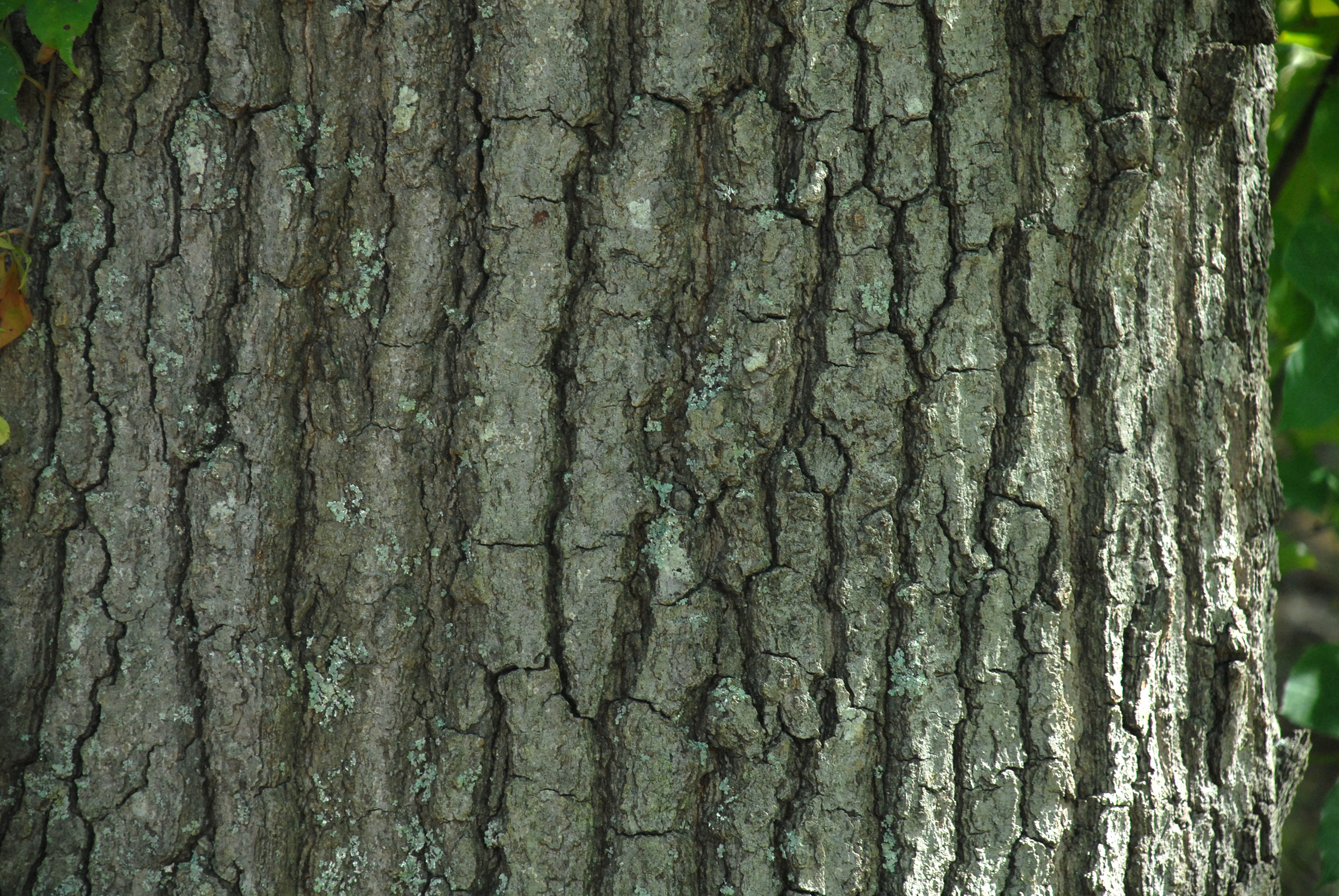
Mature Bark

Willow oak bark on young stems is smooth, gray, and tight, becoming dark and furrowed as it ages.

=== Leaves ===
It is distinguished from most other oaks by its leaves, which are shaped like willow leaves, with an entire (untoothed and unlobed) margin; they are bright green above, paler beneath, usually hairless but sometimes downy beneath.

The leaves of the willow oak are 2-5 inches long, alternate, simple, linear in shape (resembling those of a Willow, from which it bears its name), with a bristle tip. In the fall, the color will be yellow, orange-brown, to red-brown.

=== Fruit ===
The willow oak is monoecious. Male and female flowers on the willow oak are unisex, and pollination occurs through wind. The female flowers develop into acorns, while the male flowers appear as catkins. Flowering typically takes place between February and May, and acorns mature between August and October of their second year.

The fruit is an acorn, 8–12 millimeters (5/16–15/32 in) long, and almost as wide as long, with a shallow cup; it is one of the most prolific producers of acorns. The tree starts acorn production around 15 years of age, earlier than many oak species.

=== Form ===
Willow oaks are pyramid-shaped in their youth and rounded in their maturity.

Willow oaks can grow moderately fast (height growth up to 60 cm or 2 ft a year), and tend to be conic to oblong when young, rounding out and gaining girth at maturity (i.e., more than 50 years).

The largest willow oak was found in Northampton, VA, by students at Virginia Tech. The willow oak recorded was 106 ft tall with a circumference of 333 in. It was measured in 2004 and was recognized as the National Champion until 2024, when it was recognized as co-champion. As of October 2025, the champion willow oak is being removed due to extensive inner rot.

== Distribution and habitat ==
The species is most common in the American south and eastern states. It can be found from Long Island Sound south to northern Florida, and west to southernmost Illinois, Missouri, Oklahoma, and eastern Texas. Its natural range extends into southeastern Pennsylvania and southern New Jersey. It has also historically been recorded as occurring in Lancaster, Bucks, Chester, Delaware, and Philadelphia counties, chiefly on wet sites, occasionally in drier, upland ones. Much of that area has been built over and developed since World War II, and the tree is now classified as endangered in the state.

It is most commonly found growing on lowland floodplains, often along streams, but rarely also in uplands with poor drainage, up to 400 m (1,300 ft) in altitude.

=== Climate ===
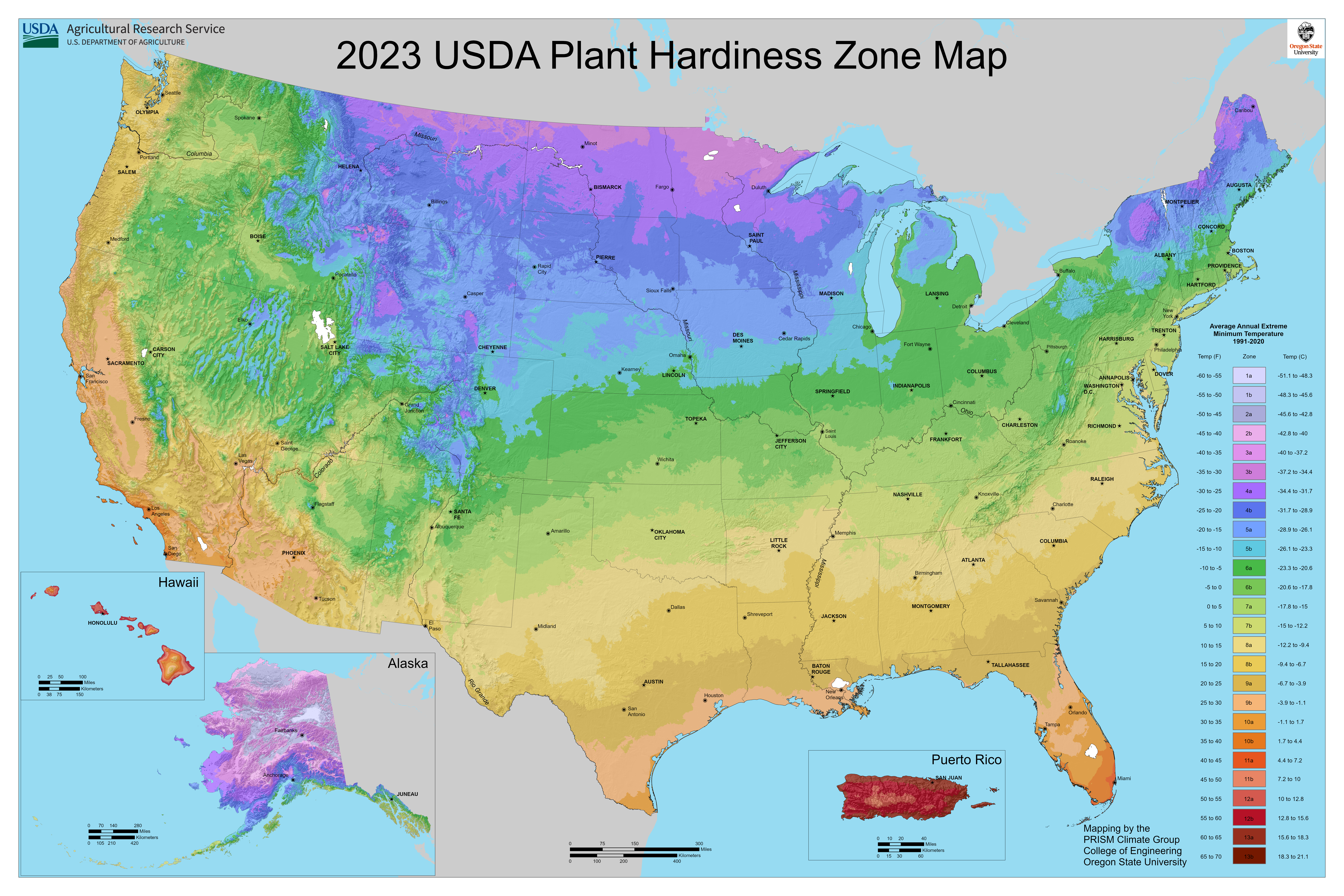
USDA Hardiness Zone Map

Willow oaks can be found in humid and temperate climates. The areas in which willow oaks mainly grow are characterized by daily temperatures above 0 °C, and where the temperature in the summer averages 21° to 27 °C. Winter temperatures range from -4° to 13° with annual temperatures ranging from 10° to 21°. Humidity averages 60 to 70 percent in January and 50 to 70 percent in July. Precipitation is fairly evenly distributed throughout the year, with more in the summer.

=== Soil ===
Willow oaks are typically found on ridges and high flats, as well as ridges, flats, and sloughs. They grow best on clay loam ridges in soils that are deep, medium textured, silty or loamy, and are granular at the roots. To achieve the best results, the topsoil should be at least 15 cm deep, contain more than 2 percent organic matter, with a pH between 4.5 and 5.5.

== Wildlife significance ==
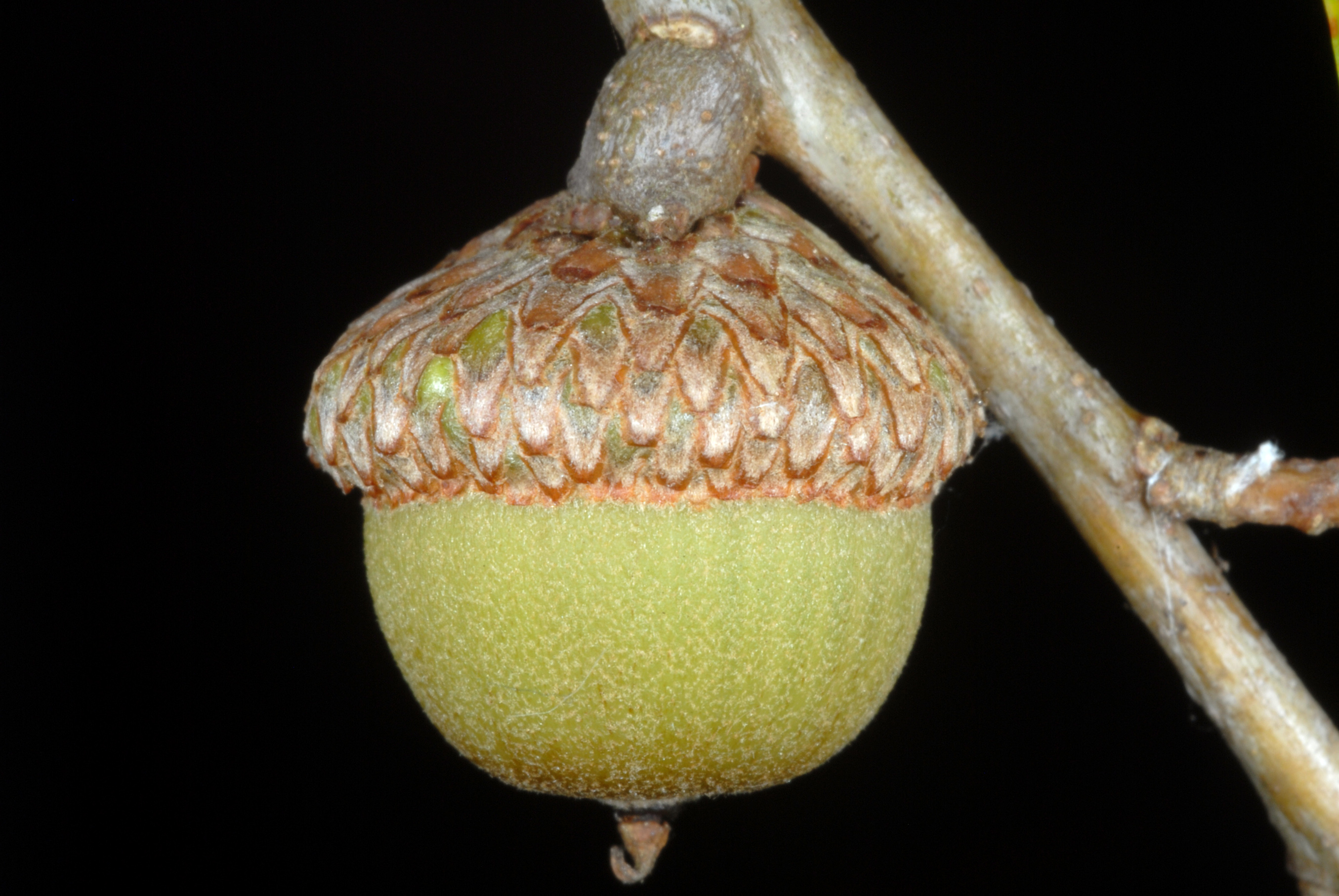
Acorn

Willow oak provides food for butterflies, moth larvae, and the Northern Walkingstick insect, as well as leafhoppers, leaf beetles, weevils, and the larvae of long-horned beetles. Willow oak acorns provide food for waterfowl, wild turkeys, woodpeckers, white-tailed deer, gray squirrels, and small rodents. Its foliage and branches also provide habitats for many animals such as caterpillars, birds, woodpeckers, owls, and tree frogs. The litter produced from the leaves of the willow oak also provides places for fungi to live and build networks on the forest floor.

The acorns of the willow oak are also a source of vegetable oil, as human food, and as livestock feed. With a yellow color, the willow oak acorn also contains high levels of vitamin A, and the pigment of which can be transferred to growing young chickens.

== Uses ==
Economic uses are primarily as an ornamental tree and the wood for pulp and paper production, but also for lumber.

Willow oak is a source of lumber and pulp; it has a light to medium reddish-brown color and has fairly coarse grain. Some of the common uses for willow oak lumber are cabinetry, furniture, interior trim, and flooring. Willow oak lumber is considered cheaper because of its comparison to White oak lumber, which is less susceptible to decay.

Historically, willow oaks have been used for pulpits, pews, bar tops, wagon axles, stairs, railings, and flour barrels. Native Americans also used the wood and bark in baths for aches and cuts. Acorns, in colonial times, were also used as a substitute for flour, and when roasted, could be used as a coffee substitute.

Willow oaks are also used to stabilize soil and filter runoff. Because of their hardy roots and ability to thrive along rivers, they control erosion along river banks. They can also be used for restoration of bottomland hardwood forests and for the rehabilitation of disturbed area.

=== Chemistry and chemical uses ===
Willow oaks have been used in medicine as antiseptics and in gastrointestinal disorders due to the phenolic compounds, terpenoids, fatty acids, vitamins, sterols, and aliphatic alcohol present in the leaves, acorns, and bark. Within the willow oak, phenolic compounds protect the plant against herbivores. In mammals, these compounds act as antioxidants, antimicrobials, and anti-inflammatories. The acorns of the willow oak contain high concentrations of carbohydrates, amino acids, proteins, and lipids.

== Horticulture ==
The willow oak is also known for its ability to handle urban landscapes. Because of their shallow root structure, the willow oak is ideal for lawns and parks, as long as their roots have room to spread. The willow oak is fairly drought-tolerant, valued for storm resistance, withstands flooding, and is tolerant to urban pollution. Willow oaks transplant easily because of their shallow roots. They are primarily propagated through their acorns. They can be planted in their desired growing location, but if transplanted, they can be moved in late winter when dormant. When planting, the willow oak grows best in full sun and, when maturing, needs to be watered deeply; along with this, applying fertilizer in the early spring and providing ample space for the canopy will give it the best chance to thrive.

The willow oak is one of the most popular trees for horticultural planting, due to its rapid growth, hardiness, balance between axial and radial dominance, ability to withstand both sun and shade, light green leaf color, and full crown. Despite being heavily used in landscaping in the Southern US (in cities such as Washington, D.C., Raleigh, Charlotte, and Atlanta) around malls, along roads, etc., the trees tend to grow larger than planners expect, which often leads to cracked sidewalks.

== Threats and conservation ==
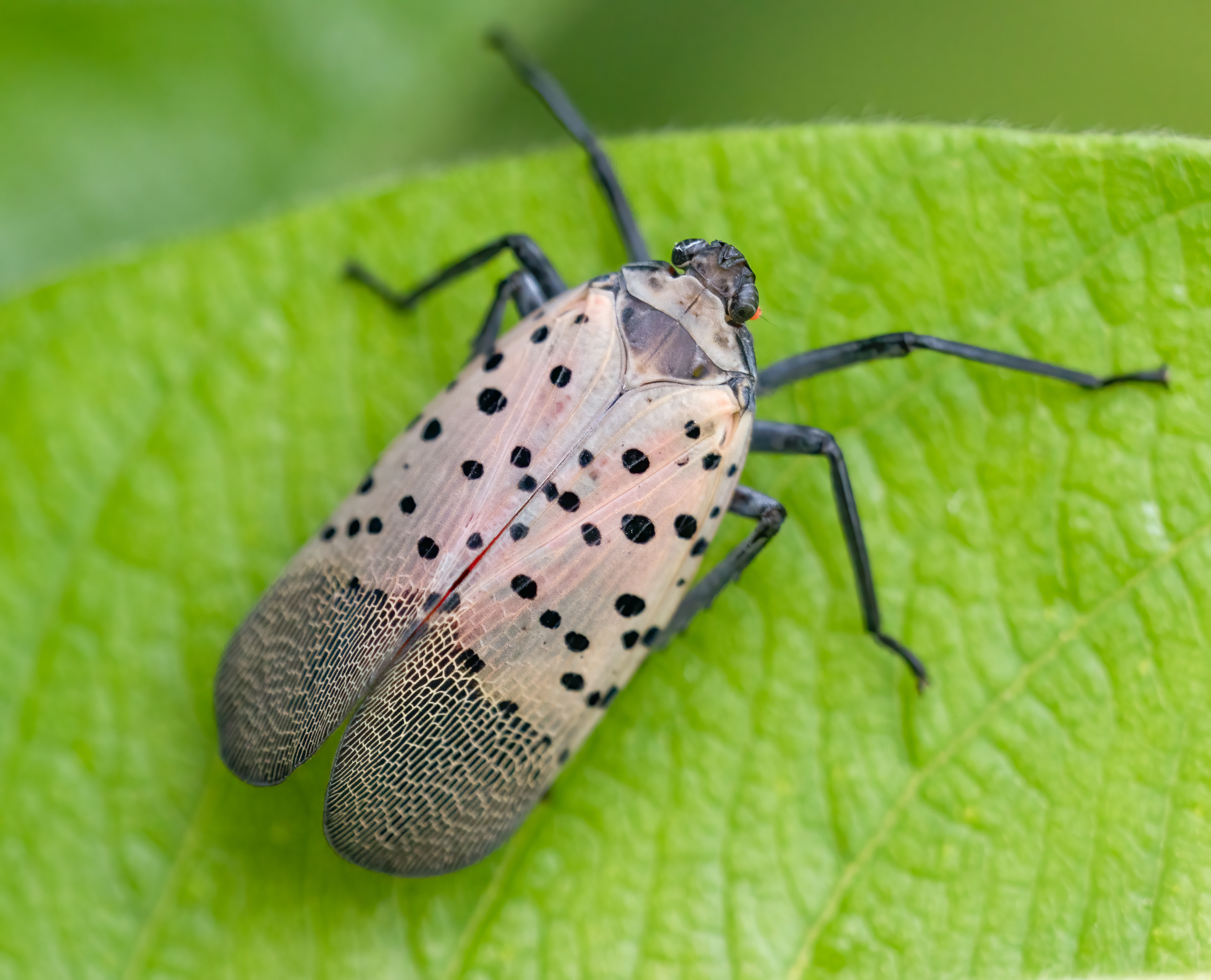
Spotted lanternfly

Many different pests can be present on willow oaks, including aphids, which cause distorted growth, boring insects found typically on weakened or stressed trees, tent caterpillars that eat the foliage, and spider mites, which can occasionally become serious. The spotted lanternfly (Lycorma delicatula) has also been recorded on the willow oak. Though these pests have not been found to be deadly to mature oak trees, they can weaken and cause the tree to decline over time. Many of these pests can be controlled with predatory insects or pruning, but others may require fertilization or pest control. Along with pests, willow oaks are susceptible to diseases. Anthracnose is one disease that may be serious; infected leaves will show brown splotches that may cause leaf drop. Canker diseases can also be present; these attack the trunk and branches and may need to be pruned out. Leaf blister, fungi, and root rot are other diseases that are commonly found on the willow oak and can be treated. Some populations of willow oak are endangered including those in Pennsylvania, due to habitat loss and invasive species.

== History ==
One of the first recorded willow oaks was found at the site of Jamestown and was found to be around 157 years old; this was determined using acorns, photographs, and tree dating. When measuring the tree, it was found to be 36.4 inches in diameter, growing between 0.26 and 0.40 inches in diameter a year. Within this study, it was found that willow oaks were present on Jamestown Island when Jamestown was established in the early 1600s.

Another prominent willow oak is the War of 1812 Willow Oak in Prince George's County, Maryland. This willow oak was likely planted in the nineteenth century, and has witnessed the War of 1812 and its growing site, Oxon Hill, become a living history site through the National Park Service.
