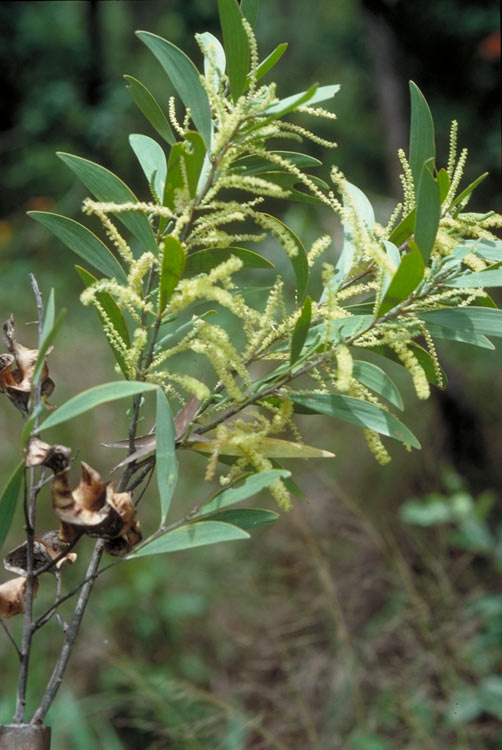

Scientific classification
- Kingdom: Plantae
- Clade: Tracheophytes
- Clade: Angiosperms
- Clade: Eudicots
- Clade: Rosids
- Order: Fabales
- Family: Fabaceae
- Subfamily: Caesalpinioideae
- Clade: Mimosoid clade
- Genus: Acacia
- Species: A. celsa

Binomial name
- Acacia celsa Mary Tindale
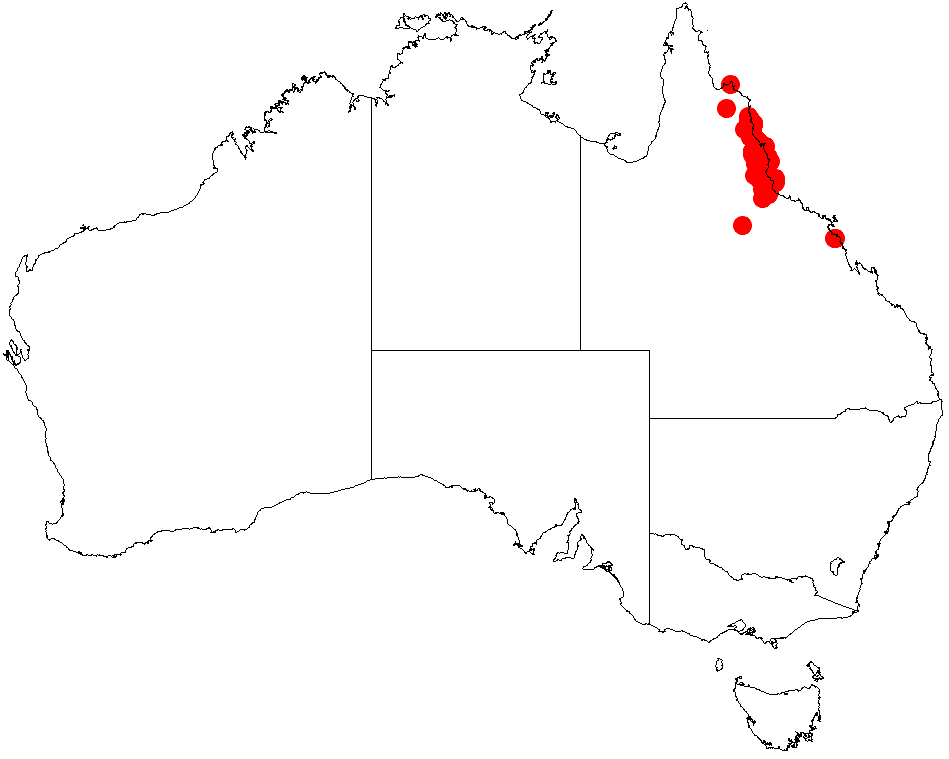
- Occurrence data from AVH

Synonyms
- Acacia aulacocarpa North Qld group p.p.; Acacia aulacocarpa subsp. C; Acacia sp. (NEQ BH 1344RFK); Acacia sp. (NEQ); Racosperma celsum (Tindale) Pedley

= Acacia celsa =

Brown salwood

Species of legume

Acacia celsa, commonly known as brown salwood, is a species of flowering plant in the family Fabaceae and is endemic to north Queensland, Australia. It is a tree with thinly leathery phyllodes that are straight on one edge and curved on the other, spikes of pale lemon yellow flowers, and leathery pods up to 30 mm (1.2 in) long.

== Description ==
Acacia celsa is a tree that typically grows to a height of 8 to 30 m (26 to 98 ft) with a greyish-green canopy and single trunk about 80 cm (31 in) in diameter with hard, thin bark. Its branchlets are glabrous and flattened at the ends. Its phyllodes are straight on one edge and curved on the other, 50–155 mm (2.0–6.1 in) long, 15–25 mm (0.59–0.98 in) wide, thinly leathery and more or less dark green to greyish-green with 3 or 4 veins more prominent than the rest. The flowers are pale lemon yellow and borne in cylindrical spikes 30–60 cm (12–24 in) long in 4 to 8 axils on peduncles 4–6 mm (0.16–0.24 in) long. Flowering occurs between January and May and the pods are oblong to narrowly oblong, 20–50 mm (0.79–1.97 in) long 15–20 mm (0.59–0.79 in) wide woody and curved to strongly curved, sometimes into an open circle. The seeds are brown to black, more or less egg-shaped, 3–6 mm (0.12–0.24 in) long with a greyish cream aril.

== Taxonomy ==
Acacia celsa was first formally described in 2000 by Maurice McDonald and Bruce Maslin in Australian Systematic Botany, with credit to Mary Tindale, from specimens collected 2.5 km (1.6 mi) east along the Mission Beach turnoff, in 1996. The specific epithet (celsa) means 'high' or 'lofty', referring to the tall stature of this species.

== Distribution and habitat ==
Brown salwood is endemic to north eastern Queensland where it is common from near Cooktown to the eastern parts of the Atherton Tableland, with a disjunct population in the Paluma Range National Park. It grows in rainforest in coastal plains and on steep mountains, usually around 600 to 900 m (2,000 to 3,000 ft) high, where it is a pioneer or canopy species as part of rainforest communities, and the annual rainfall is between 1,300–1,400 mm (51–55 in).

== Conservation status ==
Acacia celsa is listed as of "least concern" under the Queensland Government Nature Conservation Act 1992.

== See also ==
- List of Acacia species
