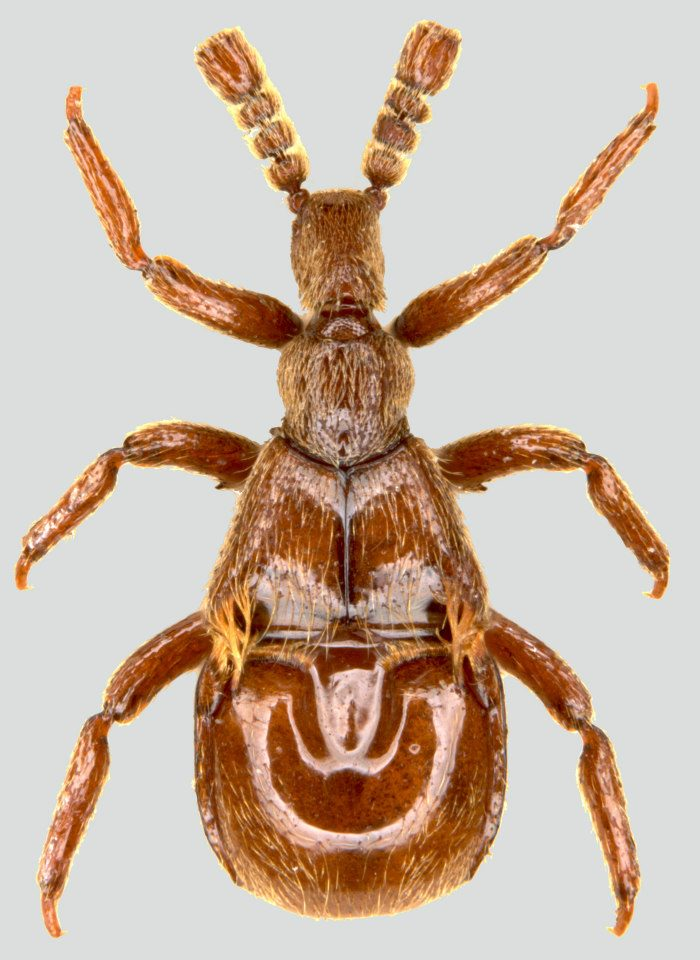
- Claviger testaceus

Scientific classification
- Kingdom: Animalia
- Phylum: Arthropoda
- Clade: Pancrustacea
- Class: Insecta
- Order: Coleoptera
- Suborder: Polyphaga
- Infraorder: Staphyliniformia
- Family: Staphylinidae
- Subfamily: Pselaphinae
- Supertribe: Clavigeritae
- Tribe: Clavigerini; Leach, 1815

= Clavigerini =

Tribe of beetles

Clavigerini is a tribe of rove beetles.

== Genera ==
- Ambrosiger Silvestri, 1926
- Apoderiger Wasmann, 1897
- Micrapoderiger Jeannel, 1960
- Trymalius Fairmaire, 1898
