= Reticulation (single-access key) =

Feature of single-access identification keys used in biological classification

In biology, a reticulation of a single-access identification key connects different branches of the identification tree to improve error tolerance and identification success. In a reticulated key, multiple paths lead to the same result; the tree data structure thus changes from a simple tree to a directed acyclic graph.

Two forms of reticulation can be distinguished: Terminal reticulation and inner reticulation.

- In a terminal reticulation a single taxon or next-level-key is keyed out in several locations in the key. This type of reticulation is normally compatible with any printable presentation format of identification keys and normally does not require special precautions in software used for branching keys.
- In an inner reticulation a couplet with further leads can be reached through more than one path. Depending on the software or printable presentation format, this may be more challenging. For the linked (= "parallel" or "bracketed") format, where each lead points to a numbered couplet, inner reticulations present no special challenge. However, for the nested (= "indented") presentation format, where all following couplets immediately follow their lead, a cross-connection to a different subtree in the key requires a special mechanism.

Reticulations generally improve the usability of a key, but may also diminish the overall probability of correct identification averaged over all taxa.
