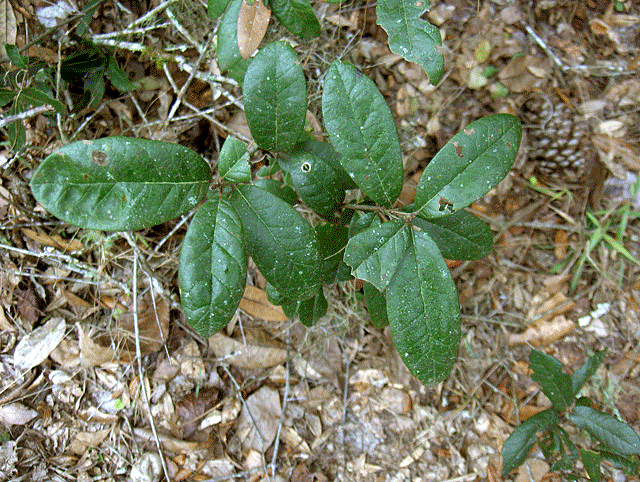

Conservation status
- Least Concern (IUCN 3.1)

- Secure (NatureServe)

Scientific classification
- Kingdom: Plantae
- Clade: Embryophytes
- Clade: Tracheophytes
- Clade: Angiosperms
- Clade: Eudicots
- Clade: Rosids
- Order: Fagales
- Family: Fagaceae
- Genus: Quercus
- Subgenus: Quercus subg. Quercus
- Section: Quercus sect. Virentes
- Species: Q. minima

Binomial name
- Quercus minima (Sarg.) Small

Synonyms
- List: Quercus virens var. dentata Chapm.; Quercus virginiana var. minima Sarg.; Quercus andromeda f. nana Trel.; Quercus geminata var. succulenta (Small) Trel.; Quercus minima f. pygmaea (Sarg.) Trel.; Quercus minima var. pygmaea (Sarg.) A.Camus; Quercus minima f. reasoneri Trel.; Quercus pygmaea (Sarg.) Ashe; Quercus succulenta Small; Quercus virginiana subsp. dentata (Chapm.) A.E.Murray; Quercus virginiana var. dentata (Chapm.) Sarg.; Quercus virginiana var. pygmaea Sarg.

= Quercus minima =

Dwarf live oak

Species of shrub

Quercus minima, the dwarf live oak or minimal oak, is a North American species of shrubs in the beech family. It is native to the southeastern United States. It is placed in the southern live oaks section of the genus Quercus (section Virentes).

== Description ==
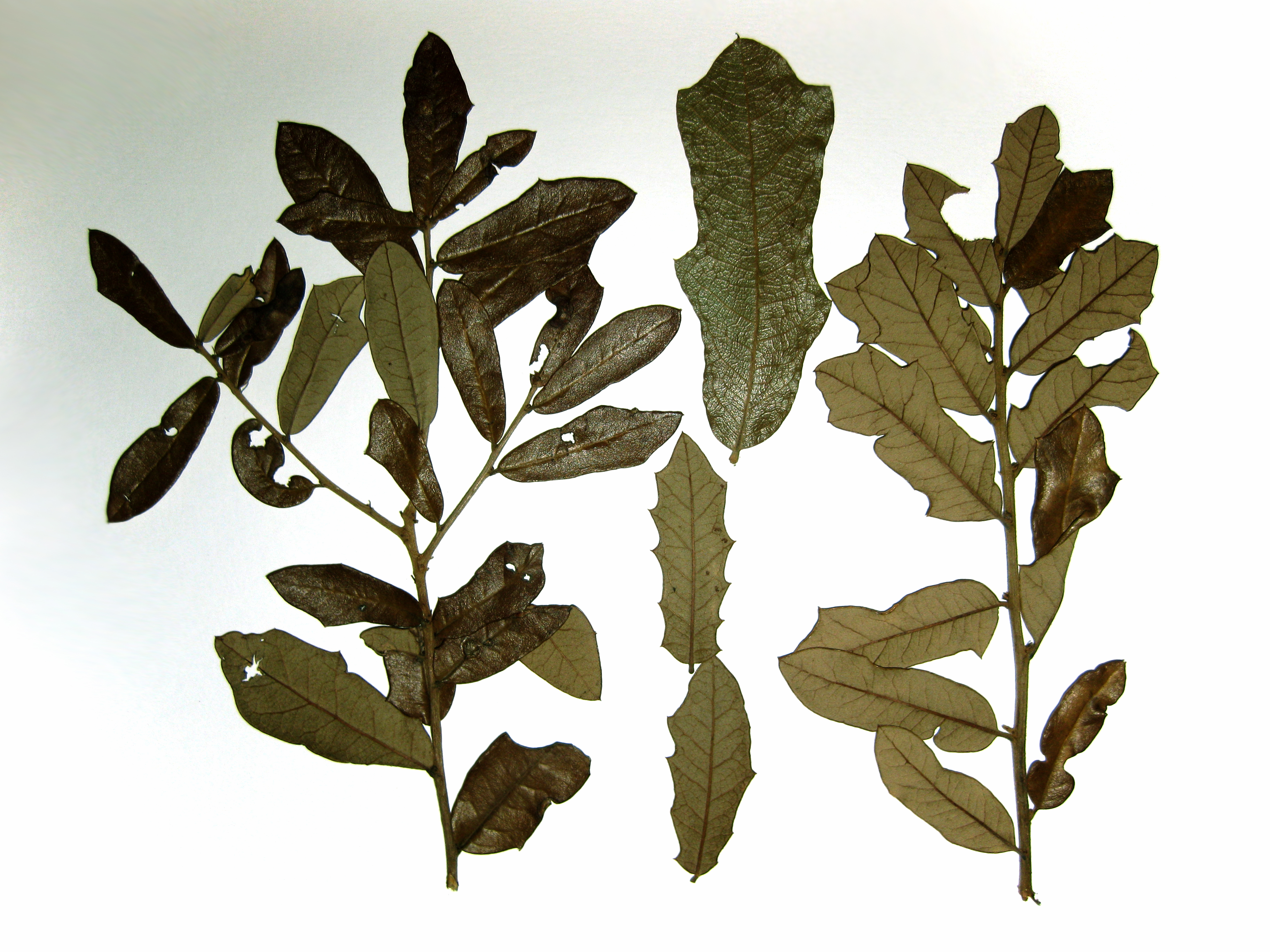
Quercus minima leaves

Quercus minima is an evergreen or semi-evergreen shrub rarely more than 2 metres (6 1/2 feet) tall, reproducing by seed and also by means of underground rhizomes. It commonly forms extensive cloned colonies with many stems, many of them unbranched. The leaves are alternate, up to 12 centimetres (4 1/2 inches) long, and toothless or with irregular teeth or lobes. The lobes, when present, are usually spine-tipped. The leaves are retained through the winter, dropping just before or as new growth resumes in late winter or early spring.

== Distribution and habitat ==
Quercus minima is native to the coastal plain of the southeastern United States, primarily in Florida but extending from there to the Carolinas and eastern Louisiana. There are reports of the species also growing in Texas, but these populations appear to belong to other taxa.

Q. minima has been observed growing in environments such as open rocky areas, pine flatwoods, slash pine flatwoods, and along wetland shores.

== Conservation ==
The IUCN conservation status is Least Concern (LC). The NatureServe conservation status is G5 Secure.
