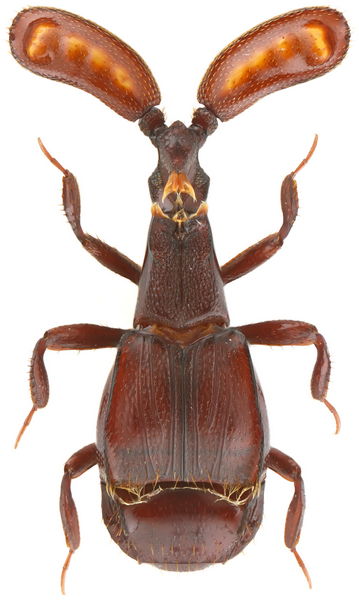
- Holotype of Colilodion schulzi deposited in the Natural History Museum of Geneva.

Scientific classification
- Kingdom: Animalia
- Phylum: Arthropoda
- Clade: Pancrustacea
- Class: Insecta
- Order: Coleoptera
- Suborder: Polyphaga
- Infraorder: Staphyliniformia
- Family: Staphylinidae
- Subfamily: Pselaphinae
- Supertribe: Clavigeritae; Leach, 1815

Tribes
- See text

= Clavigeritae =

Supertribe of beetles

The Clavigeritae form a supertribe of beetles belonging to the family Staphylinidae.

== Systematics ==
The Clavigeritae includes the following tribes:

- Clavigerini
- Disarthricerini
- † Protoclavigerini
- Tiracerini

The following are Clavigeritae genera that do not fall into the above tribes:

- Eurycheiles
- Ischyroceros
- Longacerus
- Lunilla
- Madastiger
- Mastiger
- Pseudacerus
- Tapas
- Tasmiger
