= Multi-access key =

Type of identification key that lets users evaluate characteristics in a non-set order

In biology or medicine, a multi-access key is an identification key which overcomes the problem of the more traditional single-access keys (dichotomous or polytomous identification keys) of requiring a fixed sequence of identification steps. A multi-access key enables the user to freely choose the characteristics that are convenient to evaluate for the item to be identified.

== Alternative terms ==
Alternative terms used for multi-access keys are "random-access key", "multi-entry key", "polyclave", "matrix key", "tabular key", "synoptic key". Some of these terms should be avoided in this sense, however:

- "Multi-entry" keys allow the free choice of characters only in the first step, whereas in a typical multi-access key the choice of characters used for identification can be repeated multiple times (reducing the number of remaining taxa each time). The single step of selecting one or multiple criteria is followed by a dichotomous key for the species remaining after this step.
- The terms "tabular key" and "matrix key" are best limited to a tabular presentation format of multi-access keys.
- The term "synoptic key" has an older definition, defining it as a key reflecting taxonomic classification and opposed to diagnostic keys arranged solely for the convenience of identification.

== History ==
Interactive multi-access keys are a high-tech descendant of polyclaves ("card keys"). Historically various styles of encoding features of species (such as flower color) on punch cards were used. Holes or notches in these cards would allow the user to choose cards based on characters observed in a specimen until only one card remained, yielding a tentative identification.

== Advantages ==
Multi-access keys largely serve the same purpose as single-access (dichotomous or polytomous) keys, but have many advantages, especially in the form of computer-aided, interactive keys. The user of an interactive key may select or enter information about an unidentified specimen in any order, allowing the computer to interactively rule out possible identifications of the entity and present the user with additional helpful information and guidance on what information to enter next. Full-featured interactive keys may readily be equipped with images, audio, video, supplemental text, much-simplified language in conjunction with technical language and hyperlinks to assist the user with understanding of both entities and features.

With paper-based dichotomous keys, the discovery of a new species renders the key incomplete; interactive keys are easily updated by adding information for newly discovered species and releasing computer files through the internet.

Many different computer programs for interactive keys are currently available, some of which are truly multi-access, and some not.

== Examples ==
- WATTLE Acacias of Australia Lucid Web Player (multi-access key for identifying Australian Acacias)
- Lucid multi-access key: Weeds of Australia Identification Tool. Queensland Government. (1021 species, 55 characters)
- Lucid Online Player - EUCLID Eucalypts of Australia (917 species/subspecies taxonomy as of December 2009.
- Museum Victoria Delta keys to Squat Lobster Identification (require the Delta program to be downloaded)
- Aquarium plants of the world (because they become environmental weeds in waterways)
