= Identification key =

Method of Biological categorization

In biology, an identification key, taxonomic key, or frequently just key, is a printed or computer-aided device that aids in the identification of biological organisms.

Historically, the most common type of identification key is the dichotomous key, a type of single-access key which offers a fixed sequence of identification steps, each with two alternatives. The earliest examples of identification keys originate in the seventeenth century, but their conceptual history can be traced back to antiquity. Modern multi-access keys allow the user to freely choose the identification steps and any order. They were traditionally performed using punched cards but now almost exclusively take the form of computer programs.

== History ==
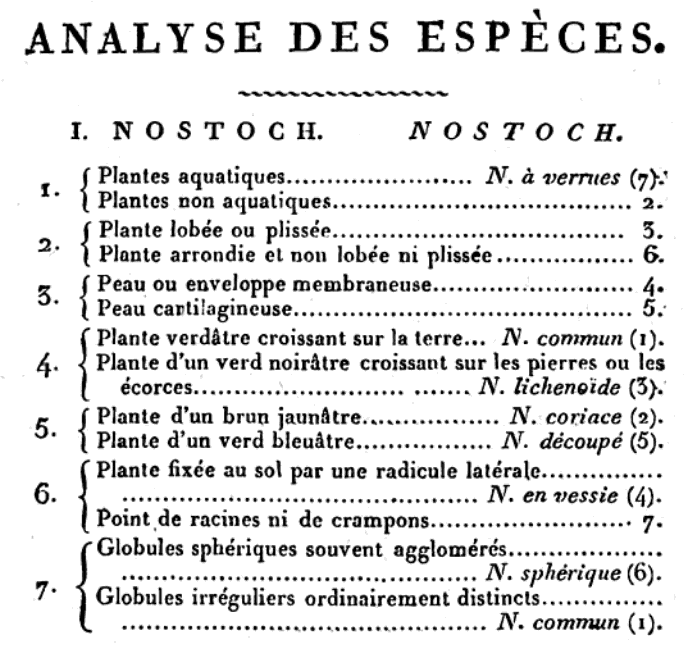
Identification key published in Lamarck's Flore française, Volume 1.

The conceptual origins of the modern identification key can be traced back to antiquity. Theophrastus categorized organisms into "subdivisions" based on dichotomous characteristics. The seventeenth-century Chinese herbalist, Pao Shan, in his treatise Yeh-ts'ai Po-Iu, included a systematic categorization of plants based on their apparent characteristics specifically for the purposes of identification.

Seventeenth-century naturalists, including John Ray, Rivinius, and Nehemiah Grew, published examples of bracketed tables. However, these examples were not strictly keys in the modern sense of an analytical device used to identify a single specimen, since they often did not lead to a single end point, and instead functioned more as synopses of classification schemes.

The first analytical identification key is credited to Lamarck who included several in his 1778 book, Flore Françoise. Lamarck's key follows more or less the same design as the modern dichotomous, bracketed key.

Alphonso Wood was the first American to use identification keys in 1845. Other early instances of keys are found in the works of Asa Gray and W. H. Evans.

=== Terminology ===
Identification keys are known historically and contemporarily by many names, including analytical key, entomological key, artificial key, diagnostic key, determinator, and taxonomic key.

Within the biological literature, identification keys are referred to simply as keys. They are also commonly referred to in general as dichotomous keys, though this term strictly refers to a specific type of identification key (see Types of keys).

== Use ==
Identification keys are used in systematic biology and taxonomy to identify the genus or species of a specimen organism from a set of known taxa. They are commonly used in the fields of microbiology, plant taxonomy, and entomology, as groups of related taxa in these fields tend to be very large. However, they have also been used to classify non-organisms, such as birds nests, and in non-biological sciences such as geology. Similar methods have also been used in computer science.

A user of a key selects from a series of choices, representing mutually exclusive features of the specimen, with the aim to arrive at the sole remaining identity from the group of taxa. Each step in the key employs a character: a distinguishing feature of an organism that is conveniently observable.

== Types of keys ==
Identification keys are sometimes also referred to as artificial keys to differential them from other diagrams that visualize a classification schemes, often in the form of a key or tree structure. These diagrams are called natural keys or synopses and are not used for identifying specimens. In contrast, an artificial identification key is a tool that utilizes characters that are the easiest to observe and most practical for arriving at an identity. Identification keys can be divided into two main types.

=== Single-access key ===
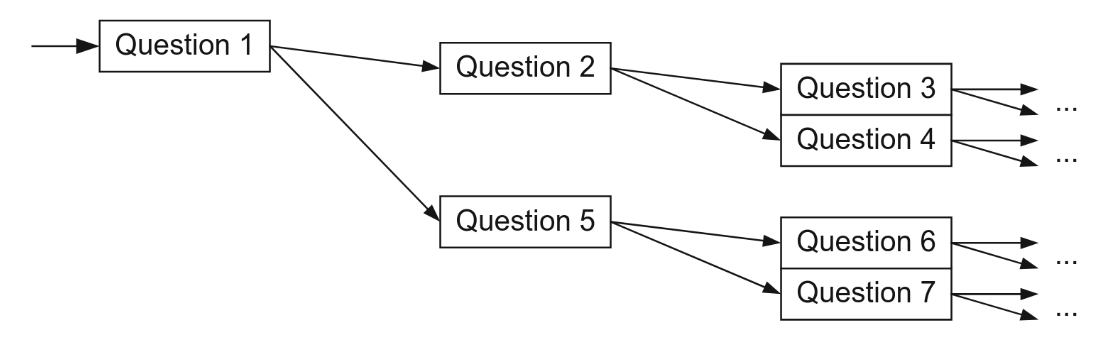
User interaction steps in a single-access key. The sequence of steps follow the data structure.

A single-access key (also called a sequential key or an analytical key), has a fixed structure and sequence. The user must begin at the first step of the key and proceed until the end. A single-access key has steps that consist of two mutually exclusive statements (leads) is called a dichotomous key. Most single-access keys are dichotomous. A single-access key with more than two leads per step is referred to as polytomous.

==== Presentational variants ====
Dichotomous keys can be presented in two main styles: linked and nested. In the linked style (also referred to as open, parallel, linked, and juxtaposition), each pair of leads (called a couplet) are printed together. In the nested style (also referred to as closed, yoked, and indented), the subsequent steps after choosing a lead are printed directly underneath it, in succession. To follow the second lead of the couplet, the user must skip over the nested material that follows logically from the first lead of the couplet. Nested keys are more commonly known as indented, but unfortunately this refers to an accidental (albeit frequent) rather than essential quality. Nested keys may be printed without indentation to preserve space (relying solely on corresponding lead symbols) and linked keys may be indented to enhance the visibility of the couplet structure.

=== Multi-access keys ===
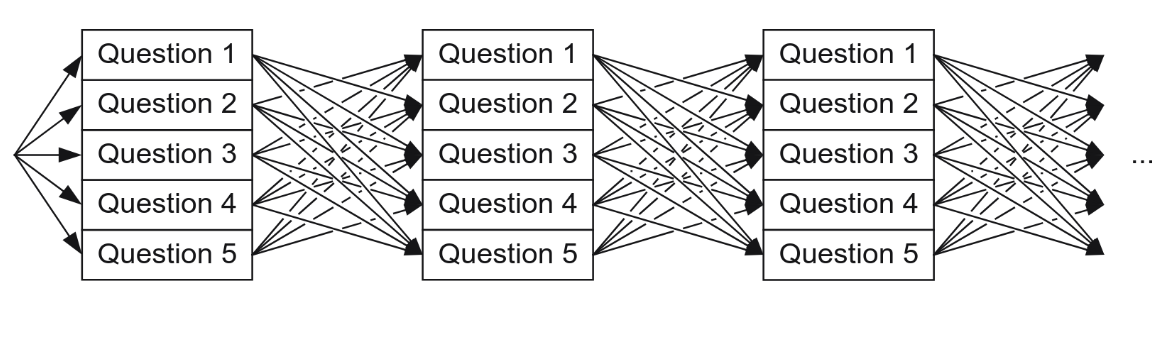
User interaction steps in a multi-access key. The sequence of steps is determined by the user.

A multi-access key (free-access key, or polyclave) allows a user to specify characters in any order. Therefore, a multi-access key can be thought of as "the set of all possible single-access keys that arise by permutating the order of characters." While there are print versions of multi-access keys, they were historically created using punched card systems. Today, multi-access keys are computer-aided tools.

== Key construction ==
An early attempt to standardize the construction of keys was offered by E. B. Williamson in the June 1922 volume of Science. More recently, Richard Pankhurst published a guidelines and practical tips for key construction in a section of his 1978 book, Biological Identification.

Identification errors may have serious consequences in both pure and applied disciplines, including ecology, medical diagnosis, pest control, forensics, etc.

=== Computer-aided key construction ===
The first computer programs for constructing identification keys were created in the early 1970s. Since then, several popular programs have been developed, including DELTA, XPER, and LucID.

Single-access keys, until recently, have been developed only rarely as computer-aided, interactive tools. Noteworthy developments in this area are the commercial LucID Phoenix application, the FRIDA/Dryades software, the KeyToNature Open Key Editor, and the open source WikiKeys and jKey application on biowikifarm.

== See also ==
- Species complex
- Systematics
- List of research methods in biology
