= Sophie Lutterlough =

American entomologist

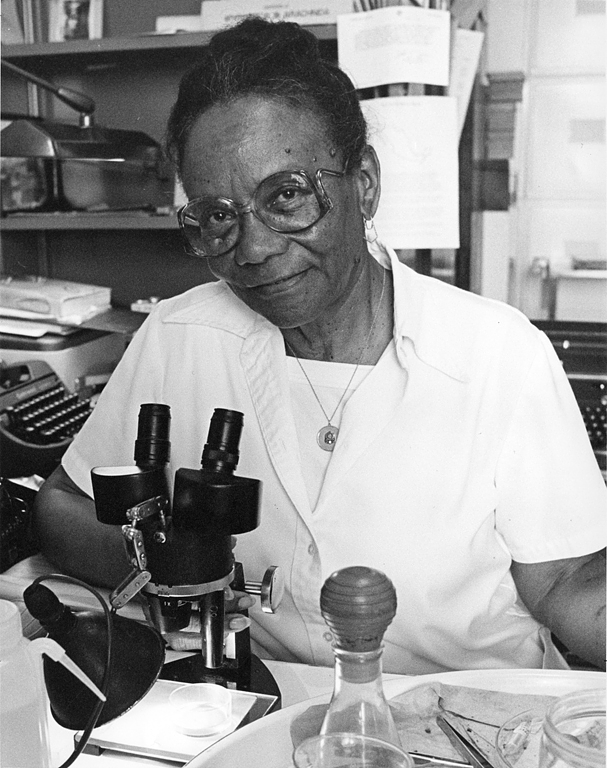
- Sophie Lutterlough in 1983 at the Smithsonian
- Born: Sophie G. Mack; 1910; Washington, D.C.
- Died: February 11, 2009 (aged 98); Monroe Township, Middlesex County, New Jersey
- Occupations: Entomologist; Museum specialist (zoology), Smithsonian National Museum of Natural History
- Known for: Classifying insects; Mite Pygmephorus lutterloughae

Sophie Lutterlough (1910—2009) was an American entomologist. Lutterlough began working at the Smithsonian National Museum of Natural History (NMNH) as an elevator operator in the 1940s at a time when discriminatory hiring practices prevented African-Americans from working in a curatorial or scientific capacity at the Museum. In the late 1950s, after having gained extensive knowledge of the museum's exhibitions, she asked for and achieved a role in entomological work, eventually restoring hundreds of thousands of insects, classifying thousands. She co-identified 40 type specimens, specimens that stand as the representative example of the species. In 1979, a mite was named in her honor.

== Early life and education ==
Lutterlough was born Sophie G. Tolliver in Washington, D.C., and had three sisters and a brother. She graduated near the top of her class from Dunbar High School in 1928 where she took classes in biology.

== Career ==
In 1943, Lutterlough applied for a job at the Smithsonian National Museum of Natural History (NMNH). Racial barriers against African-Americans prevented her from direct employment in the museum's curatorial and science work. She was employed on a trial basis as an elevator operator - the first woman in that position at the Smithsonian - and held that position for 14 years, during which she studied the museum's exhibits on her lunch break and became "a one-women [sic] information bureau" to museum visitors.

It was common for people without academic qualifications in science to become scientists through training and experience at the NMNH. Lutterlough started on that path in 1957, when she asked an insect curator, J.F. Gates Clark, if she could work in his department, and gained a position as insect preparator. This had happened in 1926 for at least one other African-American, Barry Hampton, who moved from being a mail clerk to working in the Division of Reptiles and Bachtrachians, although he was still classified as a laborer.

Jeannine Smith Clark worked at the NMNH as a volunteer tour guide from the late 1960s, and Margaret Collins, an African-American zoology professor at Howard University, was a research associate at the NMNH from the late 1970s. There were no other African-Americans employed as scientists there in 1985. African-Americans were still greatly under-represented among entomologists in 2008, when only eight faculty members of 1,348 on U.S. websites could be identified as African-American.

Lutterlough worked on identifying the NMNH's insect collection, becoming a research assistant within two years. For the next 24 years, she restored and classified many arthropods in the Myriapoda group, that includes centipedes and millipedes, as well as ticks and other species. The NMNH's 1963/64 annual report, for example, reported that she restored over 300,000 ticks in the preceding year.

Lutterlough took college courses in science and writing, and studied German to support her development as an entomologist. Among her achievements were restoring 35,000 ticks, enabling her and her supervisor, Dr. Ralph Crabill, to identify 40 type specimens (a specimen that is the reference point for others in its species). She retired from NMNH after 40 years.

== Personal life ==
Lutterlough's first marriage, to Alvin Mack, ended in divorce but produced two children, Geraldine Yvonne and Barbara Jean Mack. Geraldine died in childhood. In 1941, Lutterlough married Henry E. Lutterlough. Henry Lutterlough was a member of the Earl Reece Stadtman biochemistry laboratory at the National Institutes of Health. They traveled extensively, including trips to Scandinavia, Hawaii and elsewhere in the United States. Barbara married Willis Hines in 1954 and they had two children, Barbara Elaine Hines and Bryan Edward Hines. Lutterlough remained close to her family and traveled frequently to visit them in New Jersey. Sophie and her daughter Barbara also took a Smithsonian-sponsored trip to China. Lutterlough was widowed, and in 1999, she moved to live with her daughter in Monroe Township, Middlesex County, New Jersey. She was a member of the People's Congregational Church from 1960, and the first soprano in the choir. She joined the Cross of Glory Lutheran Church and its choir when she moved to New Jersey. Lutterlough died in Monroe Township on 11 February 2009, at the age of 98.

== Honors ==
In 1979, a mite of the genus Pygmephorus was named for her. Pygmephorus lutterloughae is a large mite, described from a sample in the NMNH collection (No. 3782), collected in Oregon in 1970.

In 1983 when she retired from the Smithsonian, Lutterlough was honored with an Exemplary Service award.
