= Pygmephorus lutterloughae =

Scientific classification
- Kingdom: Animalia
- Phylum: Arthropoda
- Subphylum: Chelicerata
- Class: Arachnida
- Order: Trombidiformes
- Family: Pygmephoridae
- Genus: Pygmephorus
- Species: P. lutterloughae

Binomial name
- Pygmephorus lutterloughae Smiley & Whitaker, 1979

Species of mite

Pygmephorus lutterloughae is a species of large mite, in the genus Pygmephorus. It was described from a sample in the National Museum of Natural History collection (No. 3782), collected in Oregon in 1970 and is named after Sophie Lutterlough.
