= List of RuPaul's Drag U episodes =

RuPaul's Drag U is an American reality television series that aired from 2010-2012. In each episode of the series, three women are given drag makeovers and taught to access their "inner divas". Each is judged and evaluated on her "Drag Point Average", or "DPA": (also standing for drag transformation, performance and attitude adjustment). The contestant with the highest DPA wins. RuPaul is the "President" of Drag U.

== Series overview ==
Season	Episodes	Originally released	
Season	Episodes	First released	Last released
1	8	July 19, 2010	September 20, 2010
2	10	June 20, 2011	August 29, 2011
3	8	June 18, 2012	August 6, 2012

== Episodes ==
=== Season 1 (2010) ===
No. overall	No. in season	Title	Original release date
1	1	"Tomboy Meets Girl"	July 19, 2010
Contestants: Shaya (Saline Dijon), Reyna (Candy Graham), Linda (Paya La Renta); Professors: Ongina, Jujubee, Raven; Lip Sync Song: "Girls Just Want to Have Fun" by Cyndi Lauper; Guest Judge: Mia Tyler; Winner: Shaya (Saline Dijon); Winner's Professor: Ongina
2	2	"Dateless Divas"	July 26, 2010
Contestants: Lenae (Honey Boom), Pegah (Electra 21), Debbie (Moxy Mayhem); Professors: Raven, Nina Flowers, Morgan McMichaels; Lip Sync Song: "I'm Every Woman" by Chaka Khan; Guest Judge: Taylor Dayne; Winner: Lenae (Honey Boom); Winner's Professor: Raven
3	3	"Blue Collar, Pink Pumps"	August 2, 2010
Contestants: Shannon (Kiki Kardashian), Jules (Kitty Kardashian), Laura (Kornisha Kardashian); Professors: Ongina, Pandora Boxx, Shannel; Lip Sync Song: "No One Else on Earth" by Wynonna Judd; Guest Judge: Kris Jenner; Winner: Laura (Kornisha Kardashian); Winner's Professor: Shannel
4	4	"Super Sisters"	August 9, 2010
Contestants: Renae (Cupcake), Renetta (Starrbooty), Rozy (Bianca Dinkins) — RuPaul's real sisters; Professors: Shannel, Jujubee, Raven; Lip Sync Song: "We Are Family" by Sister Sledge; Guest Judge: Kelly Osbourne; Winner: Renae (Cupcake); Winner's Professor: Shannel
5	5	"Plump & Circumstance"	August 23, 2010
Contestants: Christine (Christina Rena), Antoinette (Terri Snatcher), Minlee (Coco Versace); Professors: Shannel, Jujubee, Pandora Boxx; Lip Sync Song: "Got To Be Real" by Cheryl Lynn; Guest Judge: Jackée Harry; Winner: Minlee (Coco Versace); Winner's Professor: Pandora Boxx
6	6	"Moms on the Verge"	August 30, 2010
Contestants: Janet (Dee Dee Tee), April (Sarah Tonin), Angela (Damita Jo Mama); Professors: Pandora Boxx, Shannel, Morgan McMichaels; Lip Sync Song: "Baby Mama" by Fantasia Barrino; Guest Judge: Debi Mazar; Winner: Angela (Damita Jo Mama); Winner's Professor: Morgan McMichaels
7	7	"Mother vs. Daughters"	September 13, 2010
Contestants: Tasha (Thunderella), Brandy (Jennasequa), Connie (Beverly Hills); Professors: Ongina, Tammie Brown, Morgan McMichaels; Lip Sync Song: "Survivor" by Destiny's Child; Guest Judge: Meredith Baxter; Winner: Brandy (Jennasequa); Winner's Professor: Tammie Brown
8	8	"A Star Is Born Again"	September 20, 2010
Contestants: Charlene Tilton (Lisa Mercedes), Dawn Wells (Chickadee), Erin Murphy (Aurora Borealis); Professors: Jujubee, Raven, Pandora Boxx; Lip Sync Song: "RuPaul's Drag U Theme" by RuPaul; Guest Judge: Chaka Khan; Winner: Charlene Tilton (Lisa Mercedes); Winner's Professor: Jujubee

=== Season 2 (2011) ===
No. overall	No. in season	Title	Original release date
9	1	"Bringing Sexy Back"	June 20, 2011
Contestants: Lisa (Rai'Zon De Rossi), Rhonda (Summer Night), Denise (Cha Cha Mizrahi); Professors: Shannel, Raven, Manila Luzon; Lady Lesson: How to leave a sexy voicemail message; Drag Tip: Uses for old pantyhose (presented by Jujubee); Dean of Dance: Andre Fuentes; Lip Sync Song: "Right Back Where We Started From" by Maxine Nightingale; Word: Gherkin; Guest Judge: Beverly Johnson; Winner: Lisa (Rai'Zon De Rossi); Winner's Professor: Shannel
10	2	"Suddenly Single"	June 27, 2011
Contestants: Marcia (Loni Fellini), Annie (Gogo West), Kris (Caprice Classic); Professors: Shannel, Ongina, Manila Luzon; Lady Lesson: How to take a sexy picture for an online dating profile; Drag Tip: How to use and store nail polish (presented by Carmen Carrera); Dean of Dance: Andre Fuentes; Lip Sync Song: "Call Me" by Blondie; Word: Escándalo; Guest Judges: Ana Ortiz, Alec Mapa; Winner: Kris (Caprice Classic); Winner's Professor: Manila Luzon
11	3	"Lesbians Gone Wild"	July 11, 2011
Contestants: Julie Goldman (Calamity), Skyler Cooper (Scorpio), AJ Stacy (Thunder); Professors: Raven, Ongina, Jujubee; Lady Lesson: How to find the perfect bra size; Drag Tip: Uses for hairspray (presented by Pandora Boxx); Dean of Dance: Tricia Miranda; Lip Sync Song: "Bootylicious" by Destiny's Child; Word: Mexicatessen; Guest Judges: Dot Jones; Winner: AJ (Thunder); Winner's Professor: Raven
12	4	"Like a Virgin"	July 18, 2011
Contestants: Megan (Smokey St. James), Sally (Jezebel Fever), Christina (Candy Wrapper); Professors: Mariah, Jujubee, Raven; Lady Lesson: How to lady-scape (groom bikini area); Drag Tip: Uses for petroleum jelly (presented by Morgan McMichaels); Dean of Dance: Andre Fuentes; Lip Sync Song: "Physical" by Olivia Newton-John; Word: "Entertaintment" (sic); Guest Judge: Molly Ringwald; Winner: Megan (Smokey St. James); Winner's Professor: Mariah
13	5	"Naughty Nurses"	July 25, 2011
Contestants: Lanell (Angel Esprit), Kim (Nikki Vixen), Hope (Tawny Foxx); Professors: Jujubee, Mariah, Shannel; Lady Lesson: How to dress sexy in undergarments; Drag Tip: Uses for a felt tip marker (presented by Raven); Dean of Dance: Candis Cayne; Lip Sync Song: "No Scrubs" by TLC; Word: Armpit; Guest Judge: Charo; Winner: Lanell (Angel Esprit); Winner's Professor: Jujubee
14	6	"Nominated by Loved Ones"	August 1, 2011
Contestants: Liz (Britney Ciccone), Latonya (Trés Jolie), Randi (Vanessa Du Jour); Professors: Bebe Zahara Benet, Pandora Boxx, Mariah; Lady Lesson: How to exercise by performing "drag diva" yoga; Dean of Dance: Jamal Sims; Drag Tip: Uses for milk of magnesia (presented by Shannel; demonstrated by Manila Luzon); Lip Sync Song: "Never Can Say Goodbye" by Gloria Gaynor; Word: Kumquat; Guest Judge: Carol Leifer; Winner: Latonya (Trés Jolie); Winner's Professor: Mariah
15	7	"Mama Mia, I Need Help!"	August 8, 2011
Contestants: Michele (Saucy Sausalito), Anna (Portia Potrero), Alicia (Bianca Baybridge); Professors: Pandora Boxx, Morgan McMichaels, Bebe Zahara Benet; Lady Lesson: How to create a Sexy Apron; Dean of Dance: Jamal Sims; Drag Tip: How to conceal personal effects in your outfit, thus eliminating carrying a pocketbook (presented by Jujubee); Lip Sync Song: "Hit Me With Your Best Shot" by Pat Benatar; Word: Pooch; Guest Judge: Carnie Wilson; Winner: Michele (Sassy Sausalito); Winner's Professor: Pandora Boxx
16	8	"A Family That Drags Together"	August 15, 2011
Contestants: Deshawna [Raven's mother] (Ladyhawke), Susan [Jujubee's sister] (Falconetta), Rachel [Manila Luzon's sister] (Lark St. Laurent); Professors: Raven, Jujubee, Manila Luzon; Lady Lesson: How to create an hourglass figure with padding; Drag Tip: Uses for cucumbers (presented by Ongina); Dean of Dance: Tricia Miranda; Lip Sync Song: "Hot Stuff" by Donna Summer; Word: Fluffernutter; Guest Judge: Shirley Jones; Winner: Deshawna (Ladyhawke); Winner's Professor: Raven
17	9	"Looking for a New Job"	August 22, 2011
Contestants: Deena Jacobs (Shalamar), Rachael (Tasty Rain), Betsy Albert (Mahjong); Professors: Tyra Sanchez, Carmen Carrera, Raven; Lady Lesson: How to make relaxing face masks out of food products.; Drag Tip: Useful items to have in your purse to avoid the walk of shame (presented by Manila Luzon); Dean of Dance: Tricia Miranda; Lip Sync Song: "9 to 5" by Dolly Parton; Word: Dictation; Guest Judge: Raven-Symoné; Winner: Mahjong (Betsy); Winner's Professor: Raven
18	10	"80's Ladies"	August 29, 2011
Contestants: Jane Wiedlin (Chiffon Brulé), Stacey Q (Savannah), Downtown Julie Brown (Donatella Mewhatodo); Professors: Carmen Carrera, Morgan McMichaels, Shannel; Lady Lesson: How to let loose with Lady Bunny's favorite things.; Drag Tip: How to use false eyelashes (presented by Raven; demonstrated on Jujubee); Dean of Dance: Toni Basil; Lip Sync Song: "Superstar" by RuPaul; Word: Moist; Guest Judge: Lynda Carter; Winner: Downtown Julie Brown (Donatella Mewhatodo); Winner's Professor: Shannel

=== Season 3 (2012) ===
No. overall	No. in season	Title	Original release date
19	1	"Real Divorcees of LA County"	June 18, 2012
Contestants: Hilary (Tatiana D'Amore), Faith (Elantra Sizzle), and Shana (Callie Tropicale); Professors: Jujubee, Latrice Royale, Manila Luzon; Lady Lesson: Smokey Eyes (taught by Anton Khachaturian); Drag Tip: Cheating your Cleavage with Raja; Dean of Dance: Phlex; Lip Sync Song: "I Will Survive" by Gloria Gaynor; Word: Dragnificent; Guest Judge: Donna Mills; Winner: Callie Tropicale; Winner's Professor: Manila
20	2	"Heroes to Hotties"	June 25, 2012
Contestants: Christine (Belle Supreme), Virginia (Empress Dupree), Bernadette (Destiny Del Ray); Professors: Raven, Shannel, Raja; Lady Lesson: Shoe lies (taught by Rami Kashou); Drag Tip: Mysterious Skin Breakouts with Latrice Royale; Dean of Dance: Phlex; Lip Sync Song: "She Works Hard for the Money" by Donna Summer; Word: Yestergay; Guest Judge: Brittany Snow; Winner: Destiny Del Ray; Winner's Professor: Raja
21	3	"Cupcake Queens"	July 2, 2012
Contestants: Chef Lovely (Sugar Sensation), Marilyn (Bitsy Sprinkles), Sarah (Candy Glaze); Professors: Mariah, Latrice Royale, Alexis Mateo; Lady Lesson: Fake Hair Do's (taught by Jesse Jordan); Drag Tip: Sunless Tanning with Willam; Dean of Dance: Candis Cayne; Lip Sync Song: "Milkshake" by Kelis; Word: Shelarious; Guest Judge: Angela Kinsey; Winner: Candy Glaze; Winner's Professor: Alexis Mateo
22	4	"Ex-Beauty Queens"	July 9, 2012
Contestants: Julie (Diamante Lamour), Qween (Sashay St.James), Tamara (Denitta De Ville); Professors: Chad Michaels, Willam, Morgan McMichaels; Lady Lesson: Instant Face Lift (taught by Jeffrey Paul); Drag Tip: Makeup Brushes with Sharon Needles; Dean of Dance: Jamal Sims; Lip Sync Song: "Jealous of My Boogie" by RuPaul; Word: Procrasturbation; Guest Judge: Tamara Taylor; Winner: Denitta De Ville; Winner's Professor: Morgan McMichaels
23	5	"Revenge of the Nerds"	July 16, 2012
Contestants: Kristy (Felicity Payne), Dylan (Ember Alert), Shante (Dolores Day); Professors: Pandora Boxx, Delta Work, Jujubee; Lady Lesson: Accessorize Yourself (taught by Ashton Michael); Drag Tip: Bigger & Brighter Eyes with Willam; Dean of Dance: Candis Cayne; Lip Sync Song: "Burning Up" by Madonna; Word: Unspookable; Guest Judge: Robin Givens; Winner: Ember Alert; Winner's Professor: Delta Work
24	6	"From Boxers to Knockouts"	July 23, 2012
Contestants: Cynthia (Kayla De Canter), Krystle (Touchè), Missy (Adina Powers); Professors: Raven, Jujubee, Chad Michaels; Lady Lesson: Sexy Moves (taught by Mario Mosley); Drag Tip: Tattoo Do's and Don'ts with Delta Work; Dean of Dance: Jamal Sims; Lip Sync Song: "Glamazon" by RuPaul; Word: Ovahness; Guest Judge: Tamala Jones; Winner: Adina Powers; Winner's Professor: Chad Michaels
25	7	"Dangerous Curves"	July 30, 2012
Contestants: Amber (Daisy Flowers), Mary (Stella Constellation), Sinead (Rita Rocket); Professors: Sharon Needles, Raja, Pandora Boxx, Lady Lesson: Creating Luscious Lips (taught by Brandon Liberati); Drag Tip: Better Eyebrows with Morgan McMichaels; Dean of Dance: Adam Cook; Lip Sync Song: "What's Love Got to Do With It?" by Tina Turner; Word: Homofessional; Guest Judge: Holly Robinson Peete; Winner: Sinead McHugh (Rita Rocket); Winner's Professor: Pandora Boxx
26	8	"Time to Grow Up"	August 6, 2012
Contestants: Cristy (Dita Devastation), M.J. (Veronica Van Thunder), Nicole (Danielle Devine); Professors: Pandora Boxx, Latrice Royale, Raven; Lady Lesson: Proper uses for shape wear (taught by Robert Rey); Drag Tip: How to remove fake nails by Sharon Needles; Dean of Dance: Jamal Sims; Lip Sync Song: "Flashdance (What a Feeling)" by Irene Cara; Word: Conflama; Guest Judge: Joely Fisher; Winner: Veronica Van Thunder; Winner's Professor: Latrice Royale
