= Trinity Towers =

- U.S. National Register of Historic Places
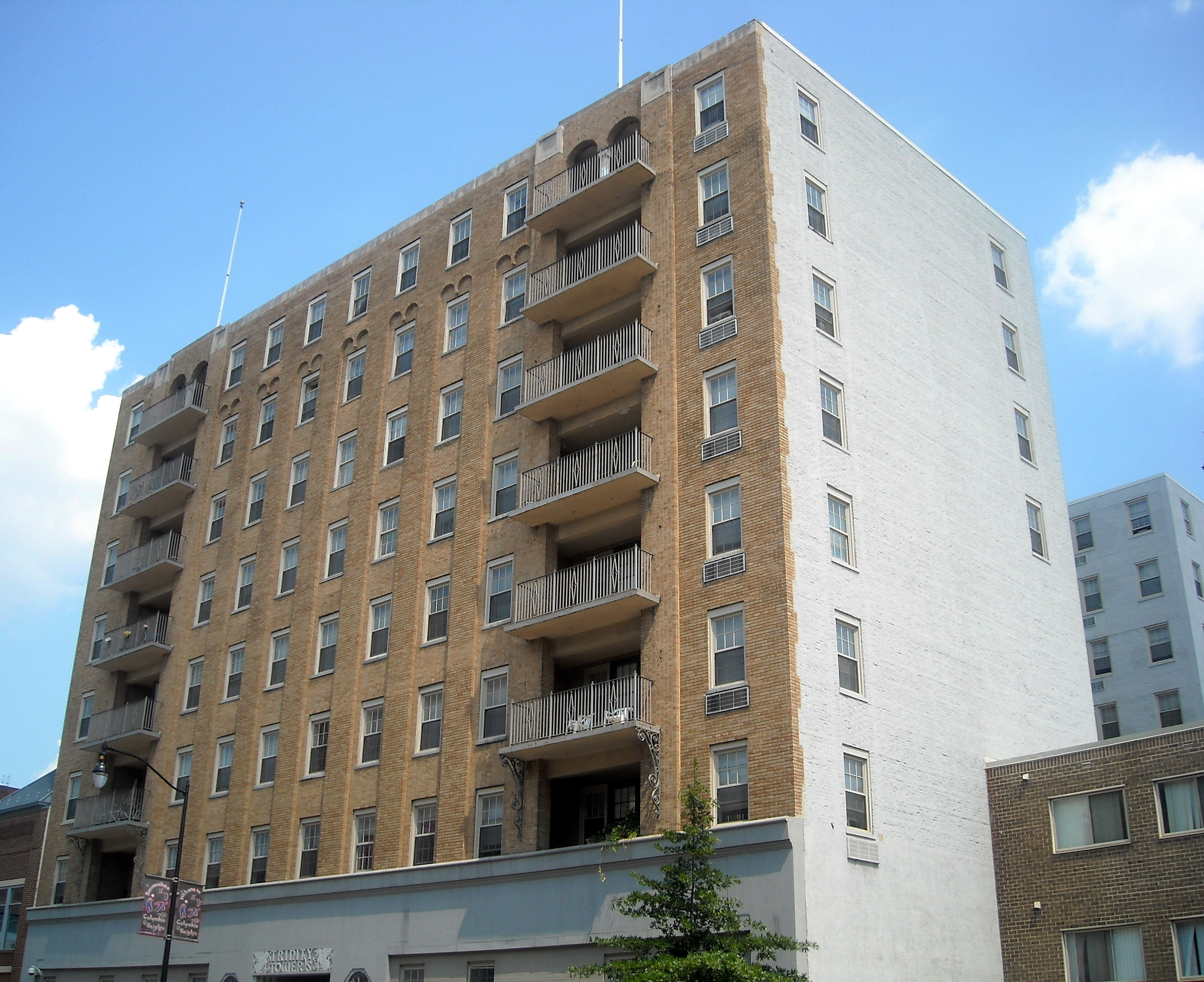

- Location within Washington, D.C.
- Location: 3023 14th St. NW; Washington, D.C.
- Coordinates: 38°55′41″N 77°1′57″W
- Built: 1928
- Architect: Harvey Warwick
- Architectural style: Classical Revival
- MPS: Apartment Buildings in Washington, DC, MPS
- NRHP reference No.: 01001367
- Added to NRHP: December 26, 2001

Trinity Towers is an historic structure located in the Columbia Heights neighborhood in the Northwest Quadrant of Washington, D.C. Harvey Warwick designed the structure in the Gothic Moderne style. It was completed in 1928 along the 14th Street streetcar line. The building was listed on the National Register of Historic Places in 2001.
