= Hilltop Manor (The Cavalier Apartment Building) =

- U.S. National Register of Historic Places
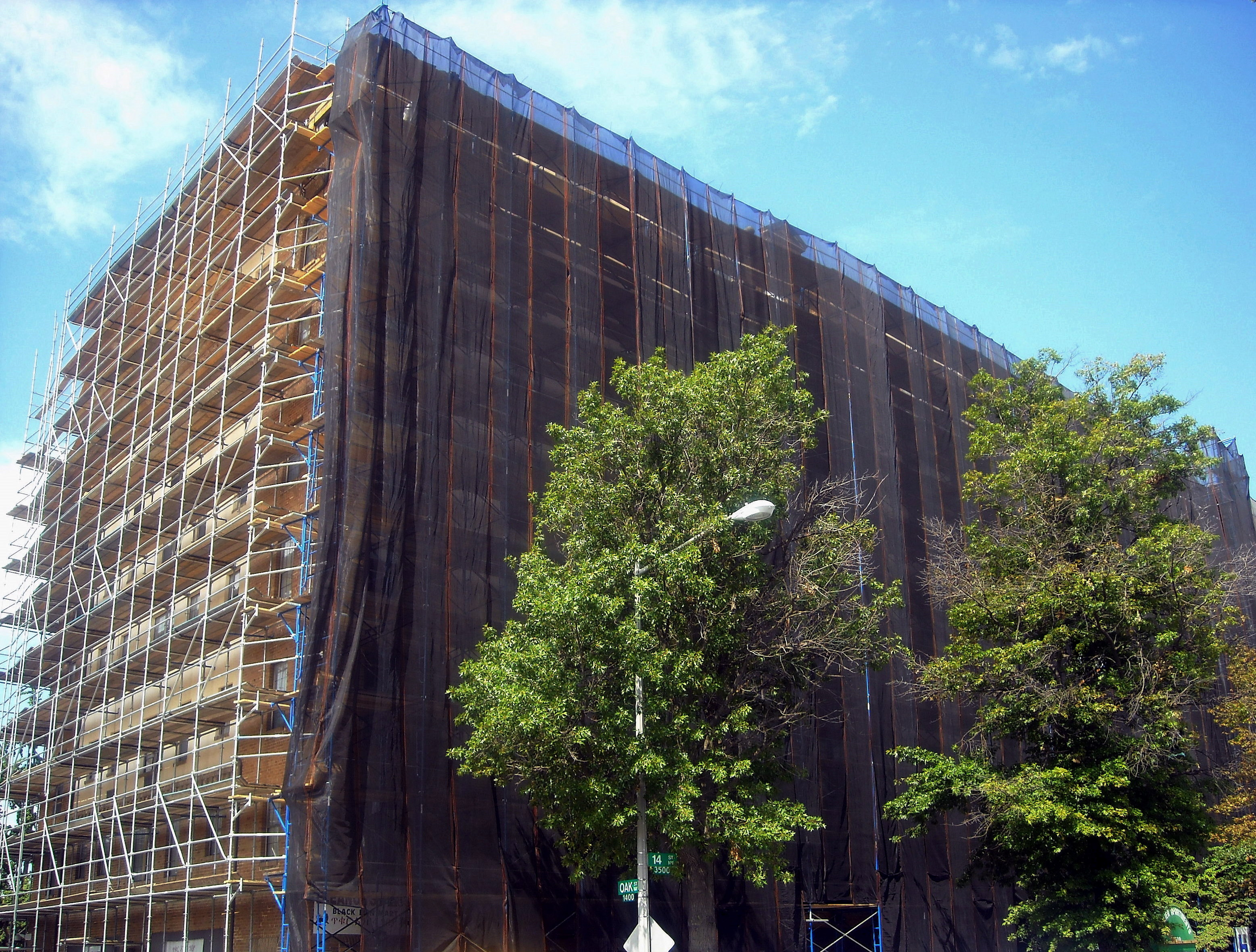

- Location within Washington, D.C.
- Location: 3500 14th St., NW; Washington, D.C.
- Coordinates: 38°56′4.58″N 77°1′59.58″W
- Built: 1927
- Architect: Harvey H. Warwick
- Architectural style: Renaissance Revival
- MPS: Apartment Buildings in Washington, DC, MPS
- NRHP reference No.: 07000810
- Added to NRHP: July 26, 2007

Hilltop Manor, now known as The Cavalier, is an historic structure located in the Columbia Heights neighborhood in the Northwest Quadrant of Washington, D.C. This building is one of several developments between architect Harvey H. Warwick and developer Morris Cafritz, and is one of the first cooperative apartment buildings in the city. The building was opened in 1927 along the 14th Street streetcar line. Its size and density shows the rapid growth Washington experienced along major thoroughfares after World War I. It was listed on the National Register of Historic Places in 2007.
