= Embassy Building No. 10 =

- U.S. National Register of Historic Places
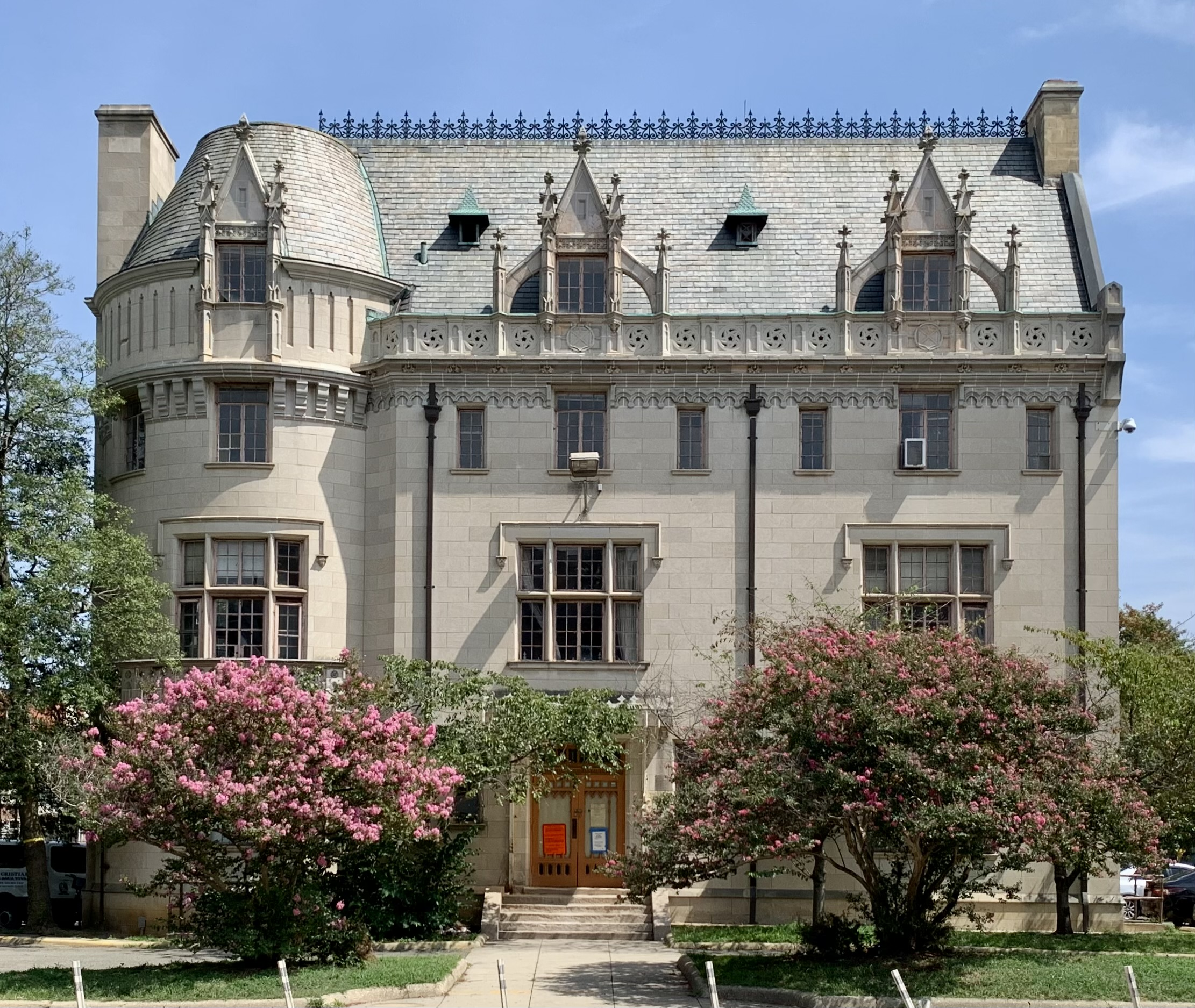
- Embassy Building No. 10 in 2023

- Location within Washington, D.C.
- Location: 3149 16th Street NW Washington, D.C.
- Coordinates: 38°55′51.5″N 77°2′10.93″W
- Built: 1928
- Architect: George Oakley Totten Jr.
- Architectural style: Renaissance Revival
- NRHP reference No.: 86003023
- Added to NRHP: November 06, 1986

Embassy Building No. 10 is a historic building located at 3149 16th Street NW Washington, D.C., in the Columbia Heights neighborhood. Although as the name implies it was built to be a foreign mission, it was never in fact used as such; instead, it served as the central office of the District's municipal parks department for nearly seventy years.

== History ==
The Renaissance Revival building was designed in 1928 by George Oakley Totten Jr., and constructed by Mary Foote Henderson in 1929–1930 as part of her attempt to create a new Embassy Row "in the vicinity of Meridian Hill Park and Mount Pleasant". She died in 1931 and, perhaps due to "the onset of the Depression as well as the failure of Henderson's heirs to pursue her business interests", the building never became an embassy. It was vacant for several years, then became a residence and boarding house during the late Depression.

In 1940, Embassy Building No. 10 became the headquarters of what is now the District of Columbia Department of Parks and Recreation. The building was added to the National Register of Historic Places on November 6, 1986. Although the ways in which the building responds to its site make up a part of its National Register nomination — "The symmetry of the facade belies the actual form and plan, designed for the wedge-shaped lot situated in the acute angle formed by the intersection of Lament and Sixteenth Streets, N.W." — the context has been lost: at some point, the section of Lamont Street adjacent to the building was closed, consolidated with the property immediately to the north, and turned into a parking lot and playground.

In 2012, the DC DPR moved "its central office operations…to two new location"s in order to "provid[e] a better working environment for DPR employees, and a place to better serve customers" than was possible in the aging building. In 2020, the Junior Achievement of Greater Washington organization, sought approval from the Historic Preservation Review Board to add an auditorium clad in limestone.
