= Park Road Courts =

- U.S. National Register of Historic Places
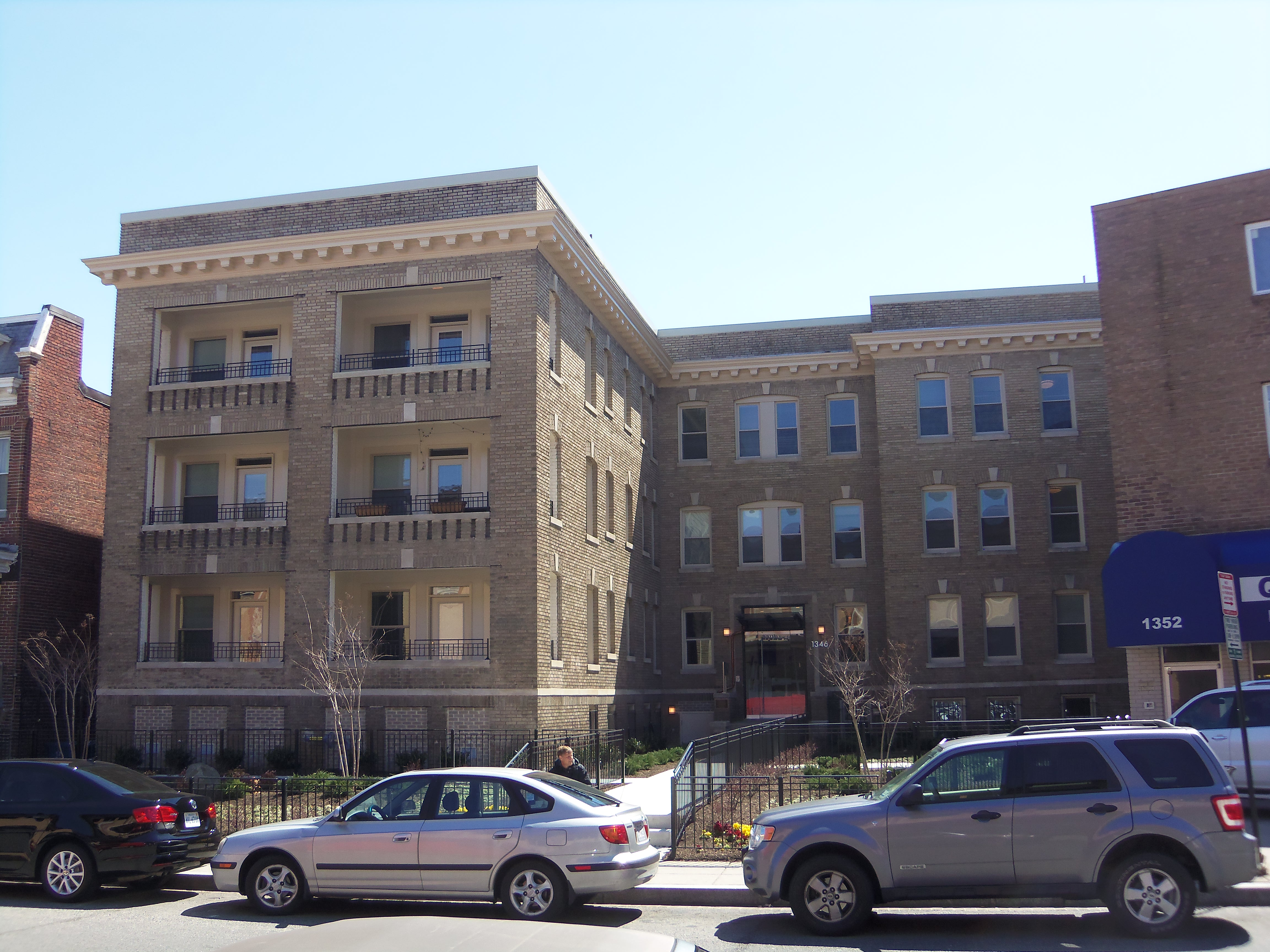

- Location within District of Columbia
- Location: 1346 Park Rd., NW; Washington, D.C.
- Coordinates: 38°55′49″N 77°01′53″W
- Built: 1916
- Architect: Hunter & Bell
- MPS: Apartment Buildings in Washington, DC, MPS
- NRHP reference No.: 12000380
- Added to NRHP: July 3, 2012

Park Road Courts is an apartment building and an historic structure located in the Columbia Heights neighborhood in Washington, D.C. It is three-story brick building built on a raised basement. The architectural firm of Hunter & Bell designed the structure that was completed in 1916. It was listed on the National Register of Historic Places in 2012.
