= Olympia Apartments (Washington, D.C.) =

- U.S. National Register of Historic Places
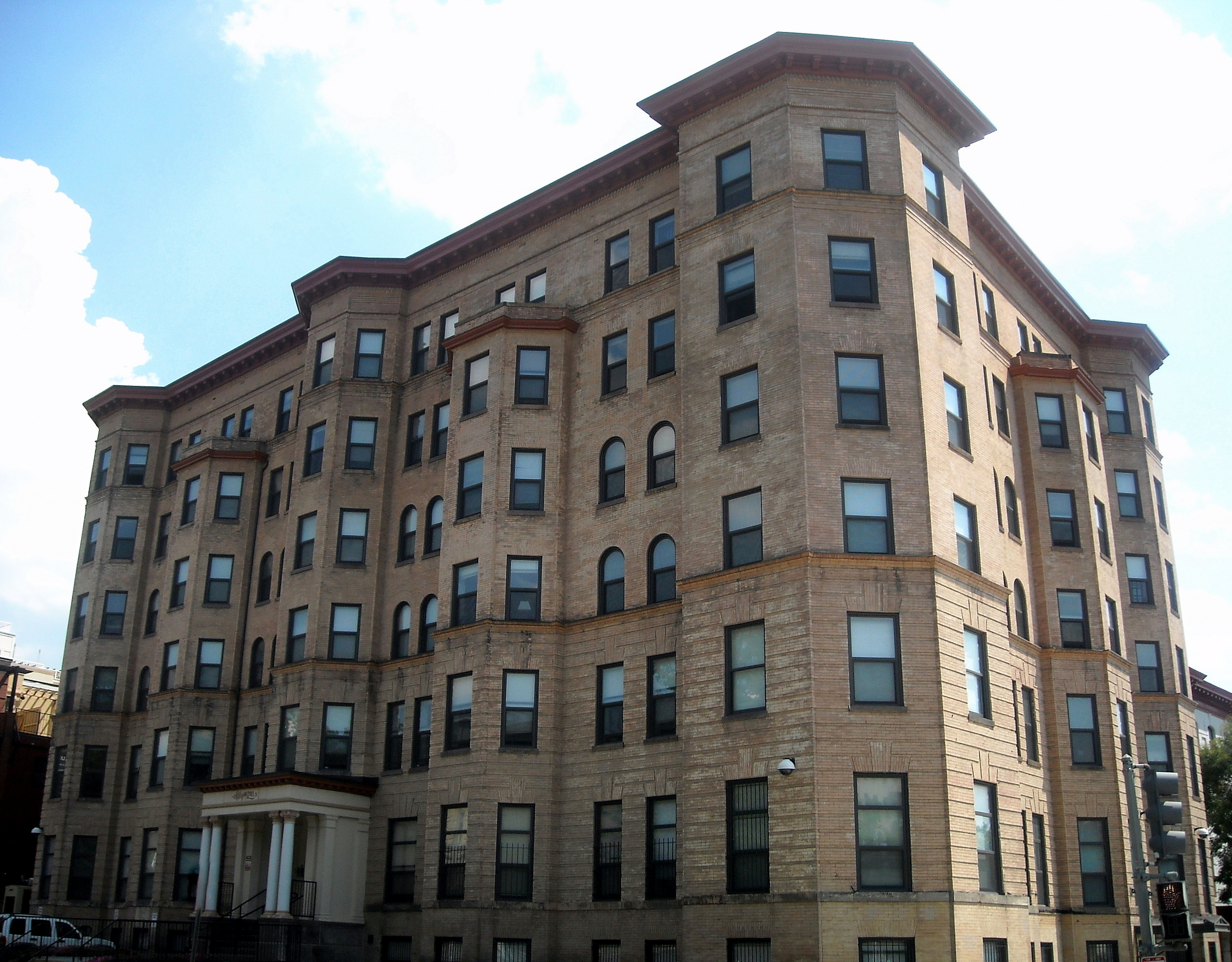

- Location within Washington, D.C.
- Location: 1368 Euclid St. NW; Washington, D.C.
- Coordinates: 38°55′24.73″N 77°1′54.06″W
- Built: 1898
- Architect: Albert B. Morgan
- Architectural style: Victorian
- MPS: Apartment Buildings in Washington, DC, MPS
- NRHP reference No.: 03000534
- Added to NRHP: June 9, 2003

Olympia Apartments is an historic structure situated in the Columbia Heights neighborhood in Washington, D.C.'s Northwest Quadrant. Albert B. Morgan designed this apartment building and it was completed in 1898.

The official District of Columbia Inventory of Historic Sites states "Stylistically, the Olympia is also notable as a transitional mixture of Victorian and Beaux Arts design, reflecting the period from about 1895 to 1905 when monumental classicism returned to favor in Washington." The building is the last remaining of the first phase of apartment blocks that were constructed near the 14th Street streetcar line. They formed Washington's first apartment corridor. It was listed on the National Register of Historic Places in 2003.
