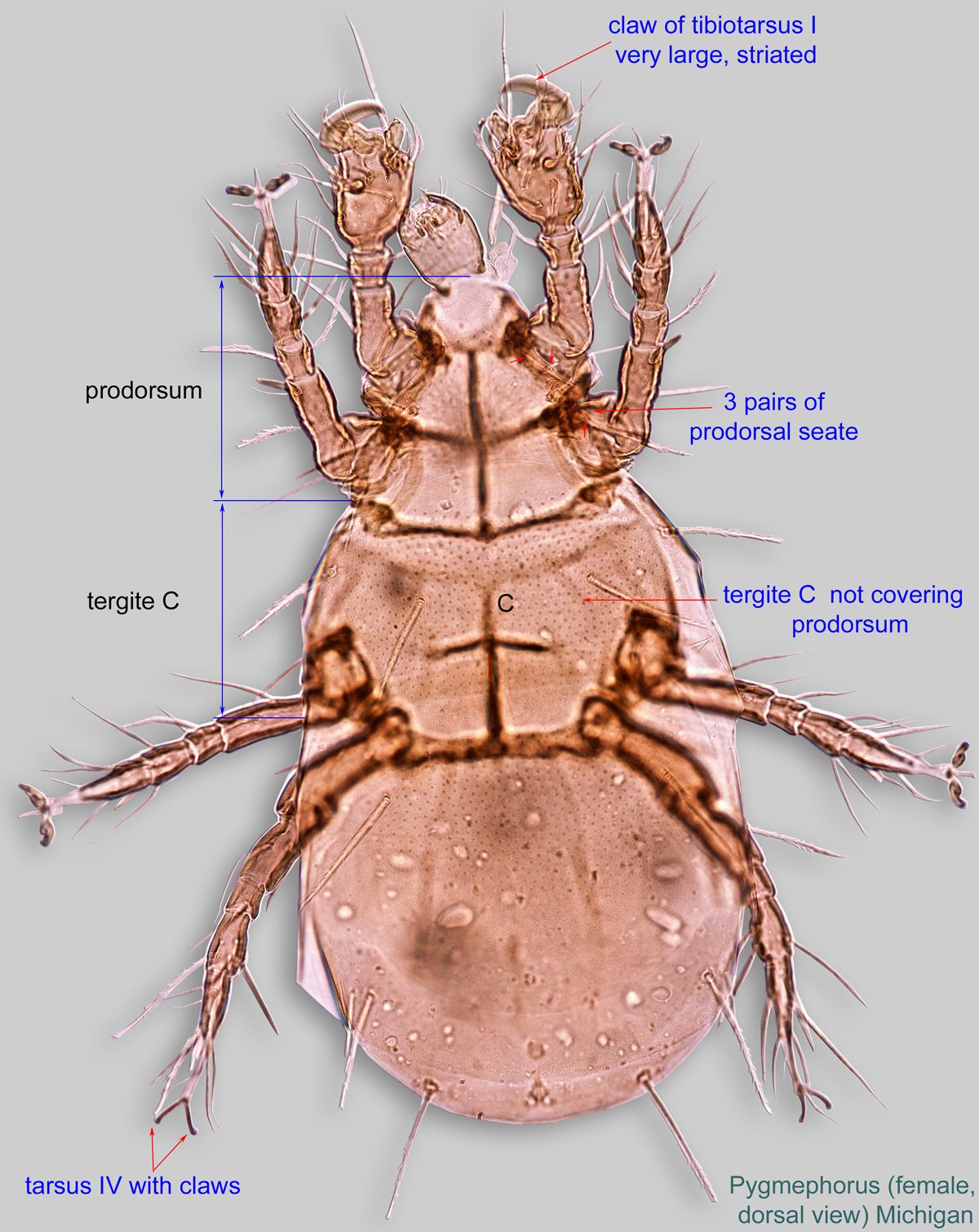

Scientific classification
- Kingdom: Animalia
- Phylum: Arthropoda
- Subphylum: Chelicerata
- Class: Arachnida
- Order: Trombidiformes
- Family: Pygmephoridae
- Genus: Pygmephorus

= Pygmephorus =

Genus of mites

Pygmephorus is a genus of large mites, in the family Pygmephoridae.

== Species ==
- P. lambi
- P. lutterloughae
