= Columbia Heights (Washington, D.C.) =

Neighborhood of Washington, D.C.

- Neighborhood of Washington, D.C.
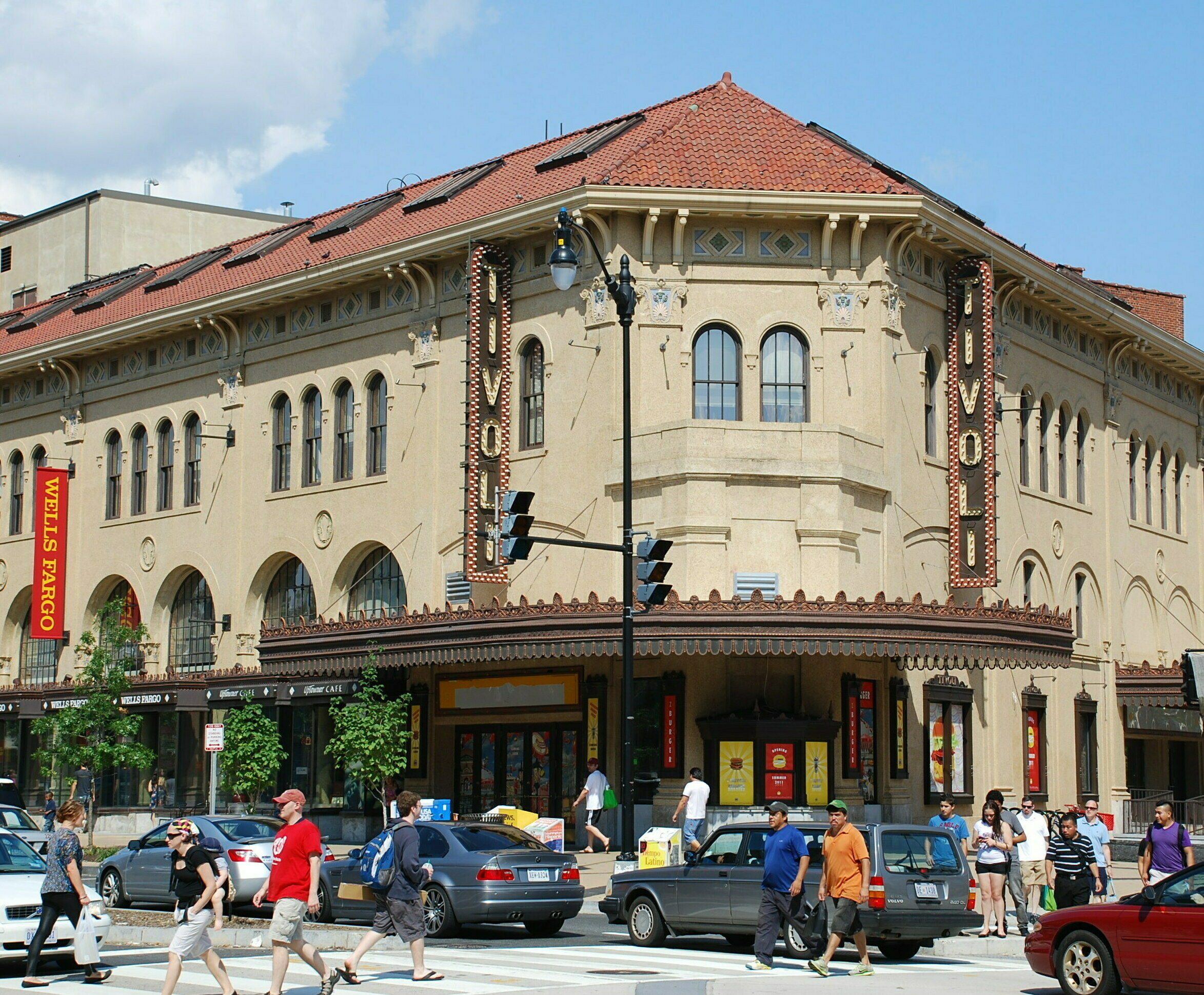
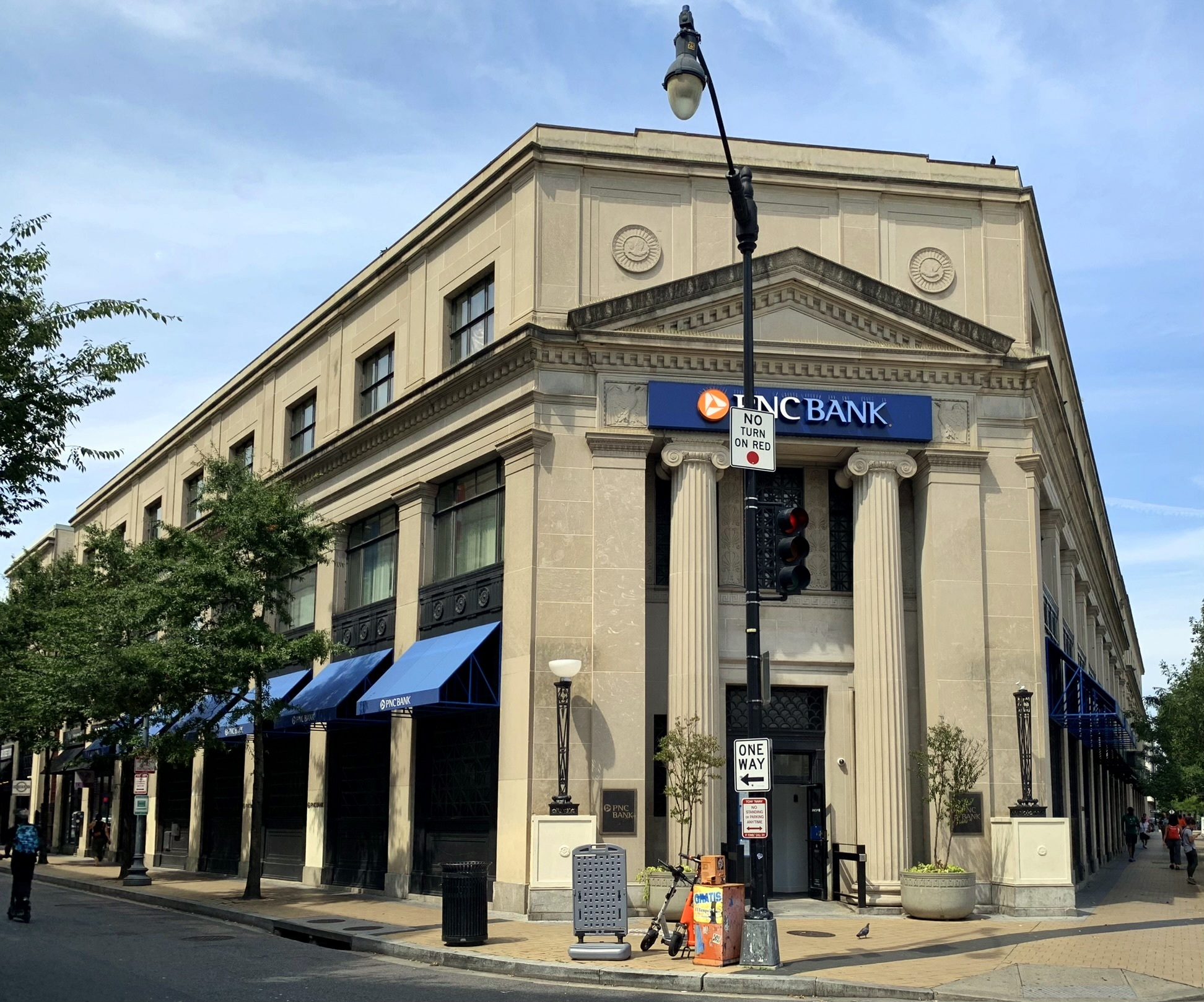
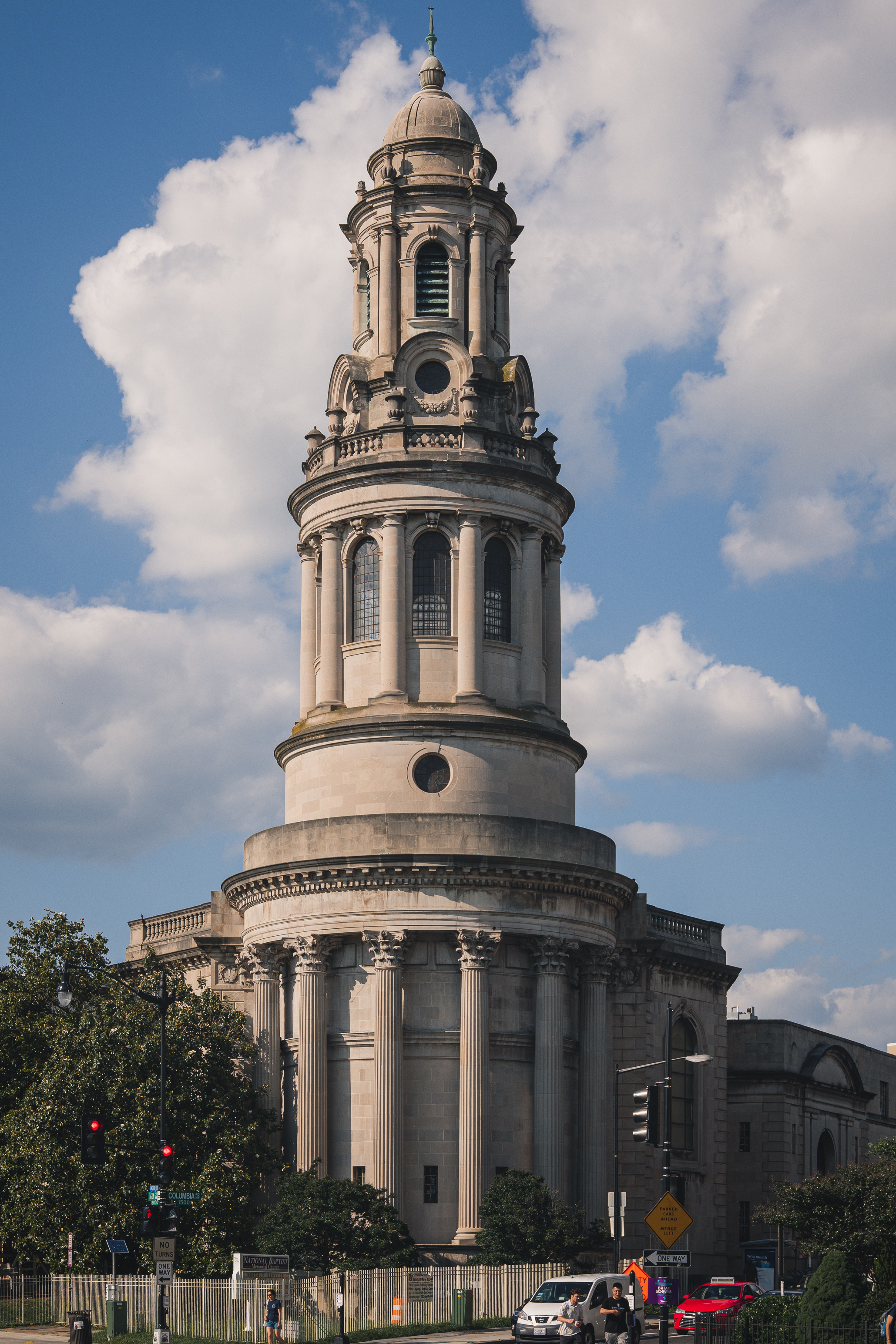
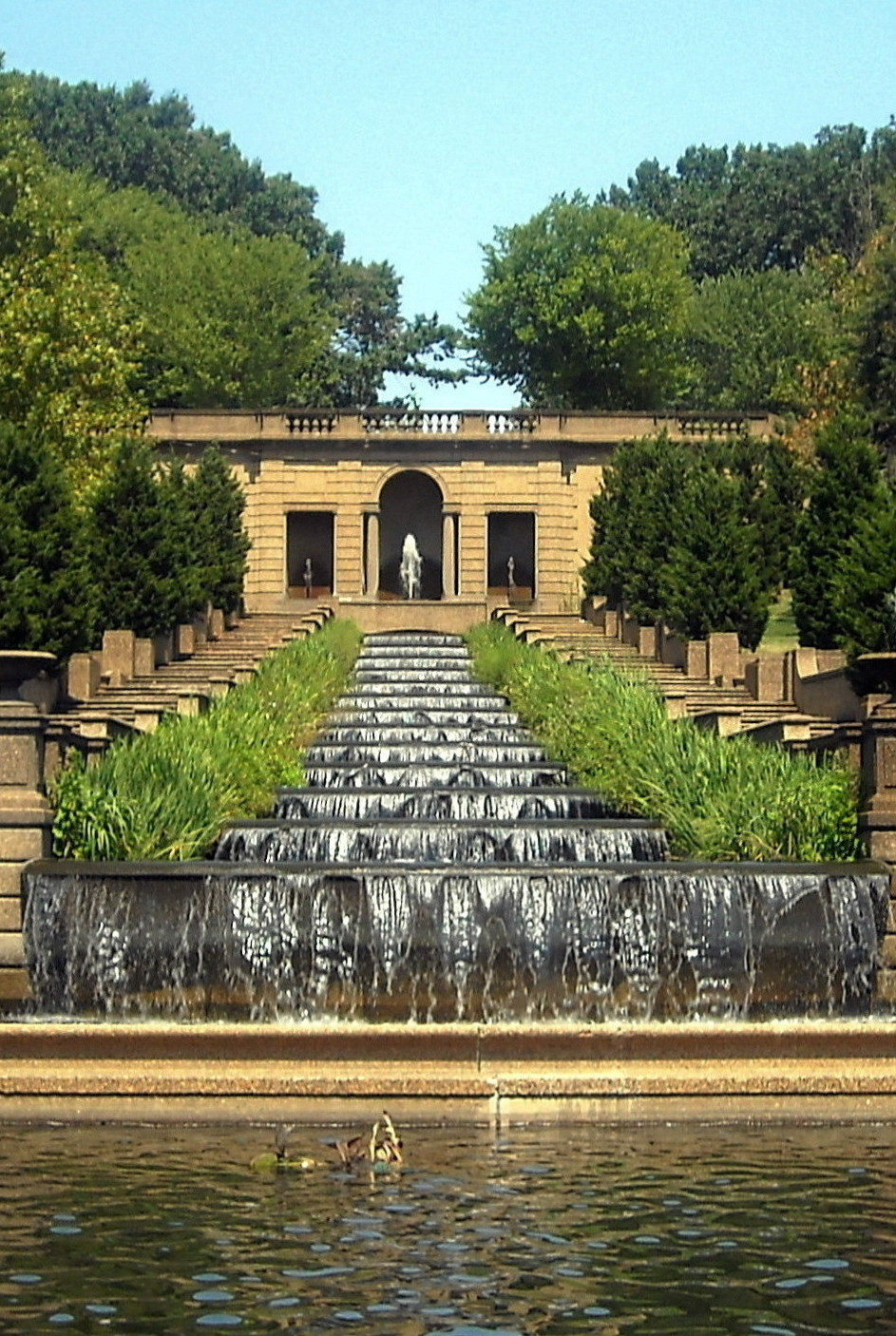
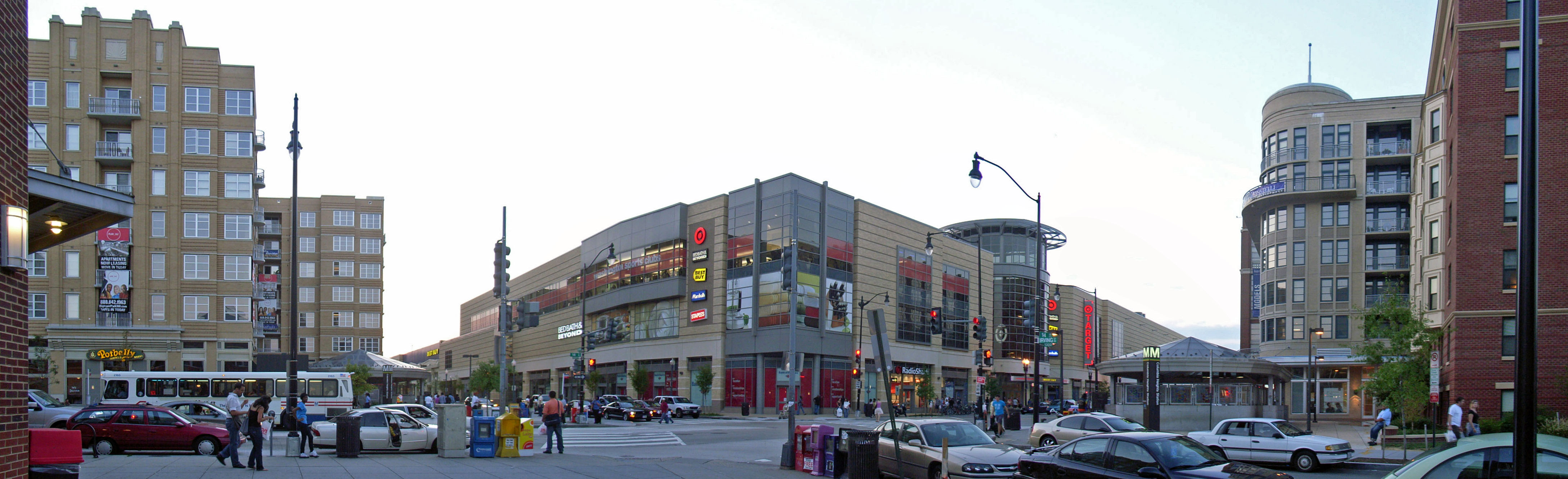
- Top: Tivoli Theatre (left) and Riggs-Tompkins Building (right); middle: National Baptist Memorial Church (left), Meridian Hill/Malcolm X Park (center), and All Souls Church (right); bottom: DC USA.

- Columbia Heights within the District of Columbia
- Country: United States
- District: Washington, D.C.
- Quadrant: Northwest
- Ward: Ward 1

Government
  - Councilmember: Brianne Nadeau

Area
  - Total: .85 sq mi (2.2 km^{2})

Population (2010)
  - Total: 31,696
  - Density: 37,289.4/sq mi (14,397.5/km^{2})
- Postal code: ZIP code

Columbia Heights is a neighborhood in Washington, D.C., located in the city’s Northwest quadrant. Bounded by 16th Street NW, W Street NW, Florida Avenue NW, Barry Place NW, Sherman Avenue NW, Spring Road NW, and New Hampshire Avenue NW, the neighborhood is an important retail hub for the area, as home to DC USA mall and to numerous other restaurants and stores, primarily along the highly commercialized 14th Street. Columbia Heights is home to numerous historical landmarks, including Meridian Hill (Malcolm X) Park, National Baptist Memorial Church, All Souls Church, along with a number of embassy buildings.

Developed as a suburb after the U.S. Civil War, the area's growth accelerated in the early 1900s. The extension of the DC streetcar system in 1914 made the neighborhood a popular place to live among federal workers. In the 1940s, the designation of Cardozo High School as a "colored" school resulted in a demographic shift and the neighborhood became predominantly African-American. The 1968 Washington, D.C., riots devastated the area and turmoil in the 1970-80s followed. In light of this, Washington Metro edited the course of the Green Line in order to service riot-torn neighborhoods. In the late 1990s, the opening of the Columbia Heights station led to the redevelopment of the neighborhood. Today the neighborhood has diverse demographics.

== History ==
=== 19th century ===
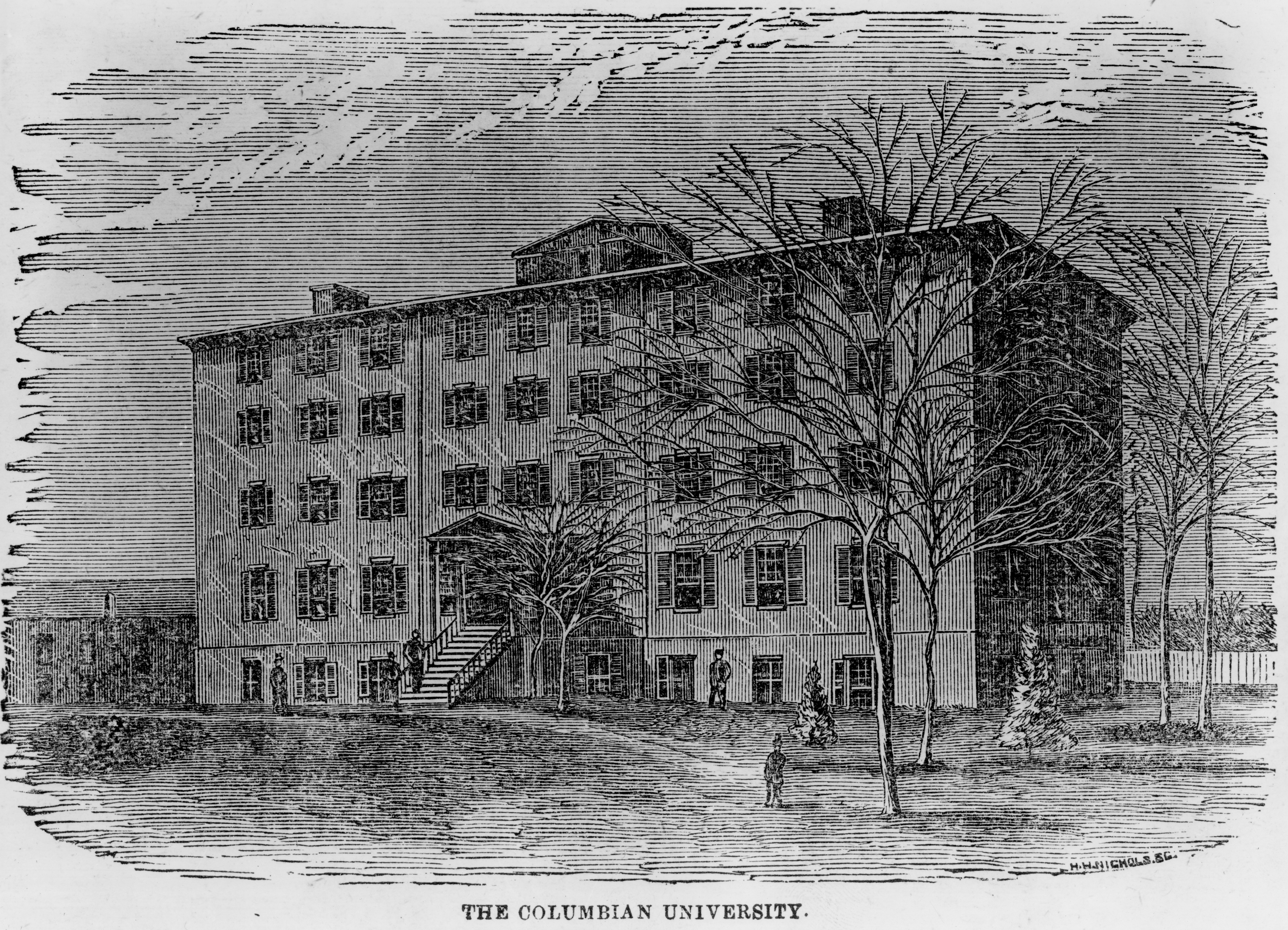
Columbia Heights takes its name from Columbian College (now George Washington University), which was founded in the area in 1821.

Once farmland on the estate of the Holmead family (called "Pleasant Plains"), Columbia Heights was part of Washington County, in the District of Columbia; it was within the District but outside the borders of the City of Washington. In 1815, William J. Stone purchased a 121-acre tract of the Holmead estate—east of present-day Georgia Avenue, and north of modern Florida Avenue—and established his estate known as the Stone Farm. Nearby, construction of the first building for Columbian College, now George Washington University, was completed in 1822 on the campus which was bounded by Columbia Road, 14th Street, Boundary Street (the original name of Florida Avenue) and 13th Street. The area began developing as a suburb of Washington soon after the American Civil War, when horse-drawn streetcars delivered residents of the neighborhood downtown.

The northern portion of modern-day Columbia Heights (i.e., north of where Harvard Street currently lies) was, until the 1880s, a part of the village of Mount Pleasant. The southern portion still retained the name of the original Pleasant Plains estate, though it was also known as "Cowtown."

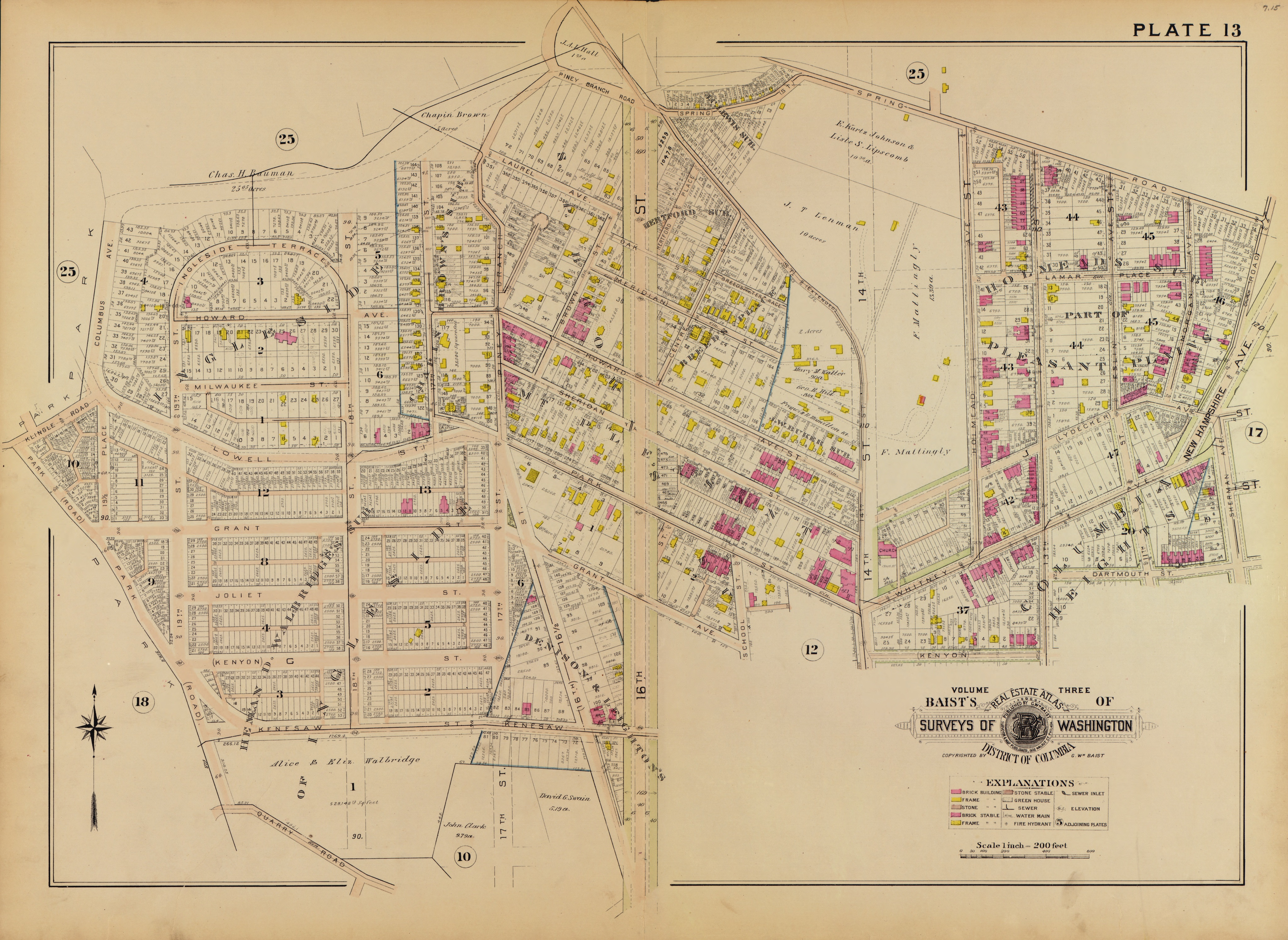
1903 Baist Atlas of the Columbia Heights development.

In 1871, Congress passed the D.C. Organic Act, which eliminated Washington County by extending the boundaries of Washington City to be contiguous with those of the District of Columbia. Shortly afterward, in 1881–82, Senator John Sherman, author of the Sherman Antitrust Act of 1890, purchased the land north of Boundary Street between 16th Street and 10th Street, including the Stone farm, developing it as a subdivision of the city and calling it Columbia Heights in honor of the college at its heart. (The neighborhood's eastern, major traffic artery, Sherman Avenue, is named after its early developer.) Much of Sherman's purchase was land belonging to Columbian College.

The college moved to the center of Washington's downtown business district and in 1904, changed its name to The George Washington University, in an agreement with the George Washington Memorial Association. By 1912 Columbian, now George Washington, relocated its major operations to Foggy Bottom. The federal government purchased some of the college's former land and built Meridian Hill Park in the early 20th century.

=== 20th century ===
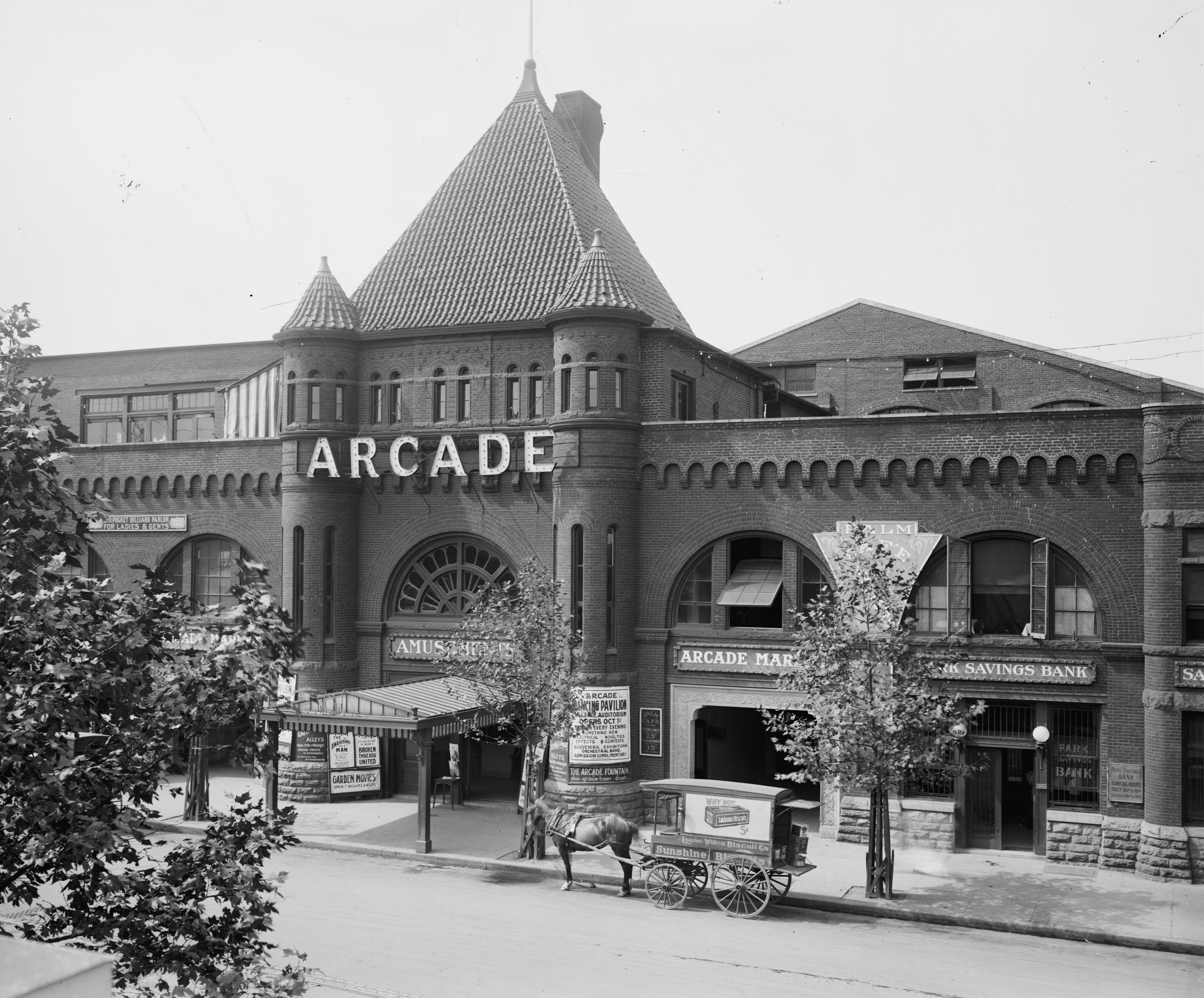
The Arcade Market, built in 1910.

Upscale development in Columbia Heights circa 1900 was designed to attract upper level managers of the Federal government, U.S. Supreme Court justices, and high-ranking military officers. An imposing mansion, Belmont, marked the entrance to the neighborhood between Florida and Clifton Streets. The mansion was emblematic of the confidence that the affluent placed in the concept that Columbia Heights represented the ideal suburb. In the early 1900s, many of Washington's wealthiest residents lived in the neighborhood. Residents included authors Jean Toomer, Ambrose Bierce, Sinclair Lewis, Chief Justice Melville Fuller, and Justice John Marshall Harlan.

In 1901, the Commissioners of the District of Columbia renamed streets all over the District in accordance with a newly adopted street-naming system. Roanoke Street, Yale Street, Princeton Street, Kenesaw Avenue, and Whitney Avenue were renamed Euclid Street, Fairmont Street, Girard Street, Irving Street, and Park Road respectively.

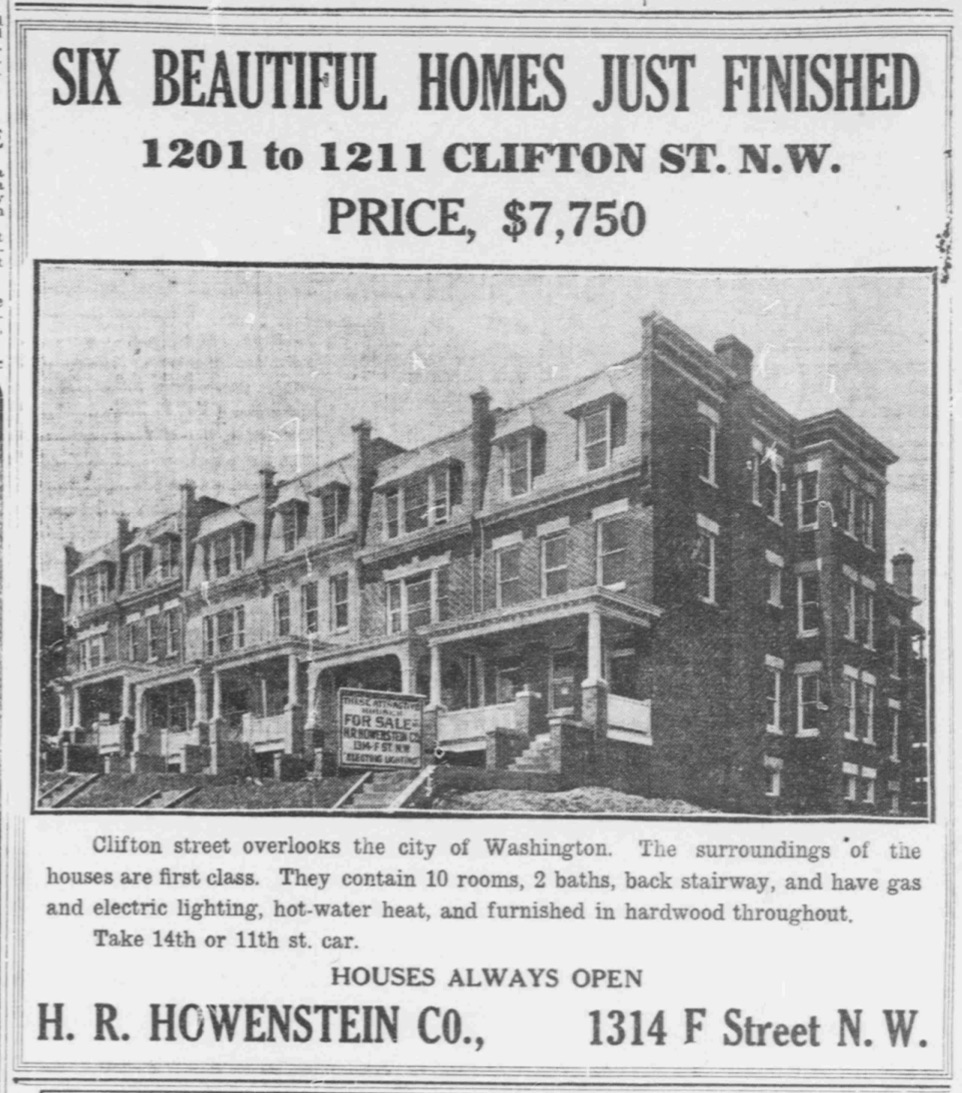
A 1910 advertisement for a housing development on Clifton Street.

In 1902, there was a building boom in North Columbia Heights, with the expansion of the streetcar down 11th St, 14th St and 16th St. Homes were being built for between $2,000 and $5,000 and a total of five million dollars' worth of homes were being built.

In 1904, the Columbia Heights Citizen's Association published an illustrated brochure entitled "A Statement of Some of the Advantages of Beautiful Columbia Heights." 1904 was also the year that Congress authorized changing the names of streets to align with the alphabetical and orderly naming convention of the Old City (i.e., below Boundary Street, now Florida Avenue).

By 1914, four streetcar lines served the section providing transportation to downtown Washington in twenty minutes. The neighborhood also became the home of the Washington Palace Five professional basketball team.

The popularity of the neighborhood resulted in the construction of several large apartment buildings during the beginning of the twentieth century that changed the suburban character of the area into a more urban and densely populated district. As of mid-century, however, Columbia Heights retained much of its upscale residential appeal, supporting establishments such as the ornate Tivoli Theatre movie house (completed in 1924).

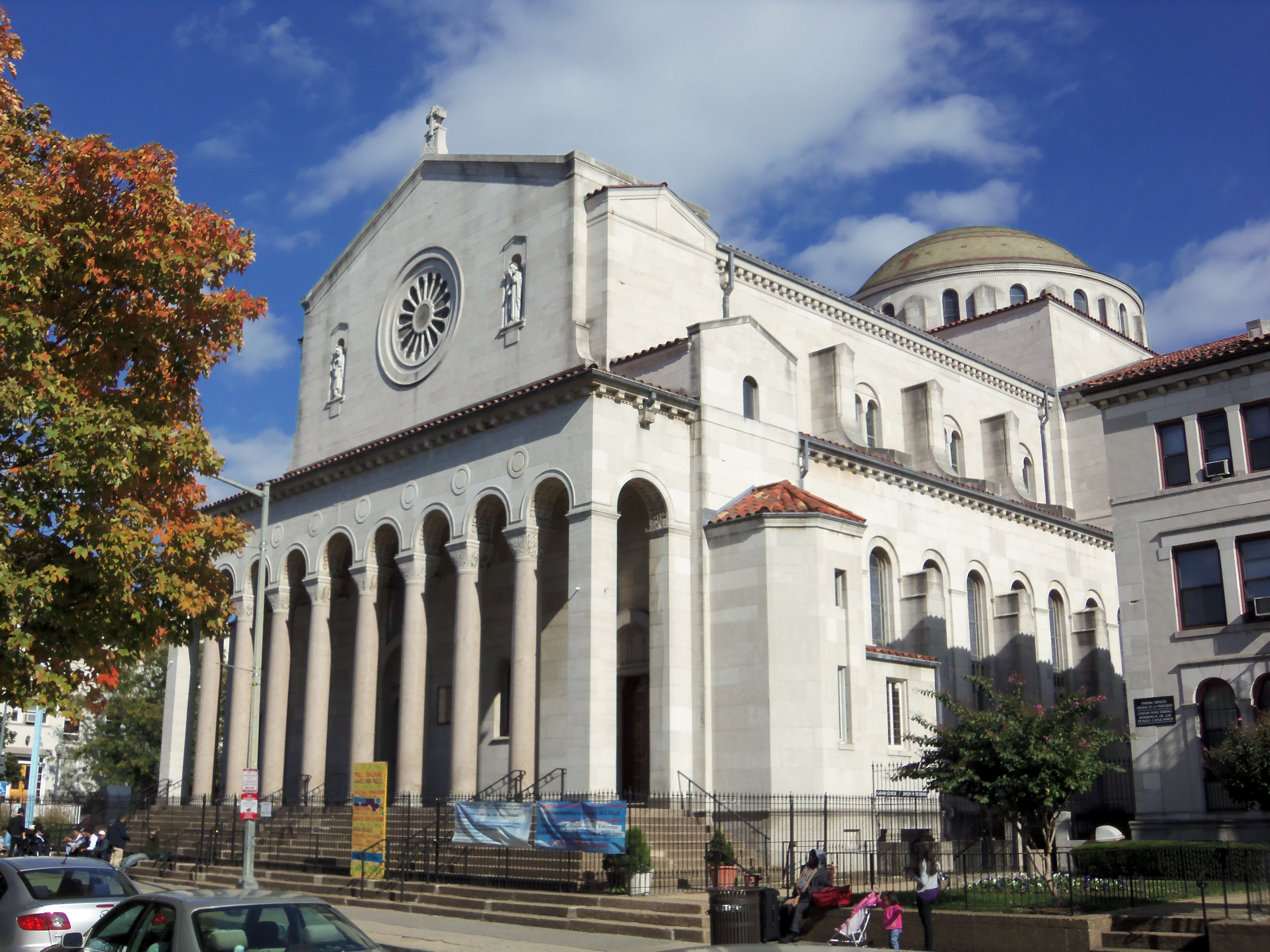
Shrine of the Sacred Heart, built by Murphy & Olmsted in 1922

J. Willard Marriott and his wife opened an A&W Root Beer franchise on 14th street in 1927, before creating the Marriott hotel chain. The neighborhood was adjacent to Washington's thriving middle-class Black community and came to be home to some of its most notable citizens by the 1930s.

In 1949, during the era of racial segregation in the public schools, Central High School, a white high school that bordered the southern edge of Columbia Heights, did not have enough students. It was renamed as Cardozo High School and designated as a "colored" high school to accommodate the growing Black population in the neighborhood. Significant demographic changes began in the late 1940s when Black residents began to buy apartment buildings previously owned by whites, and in the 1950s Black people bought individual homes in ever increasing numbers. The neighborhood was a strong Black middle-class enclave in Washington, along with the nearby Shaw neighborhood and Howard University, through the mid-1960s.

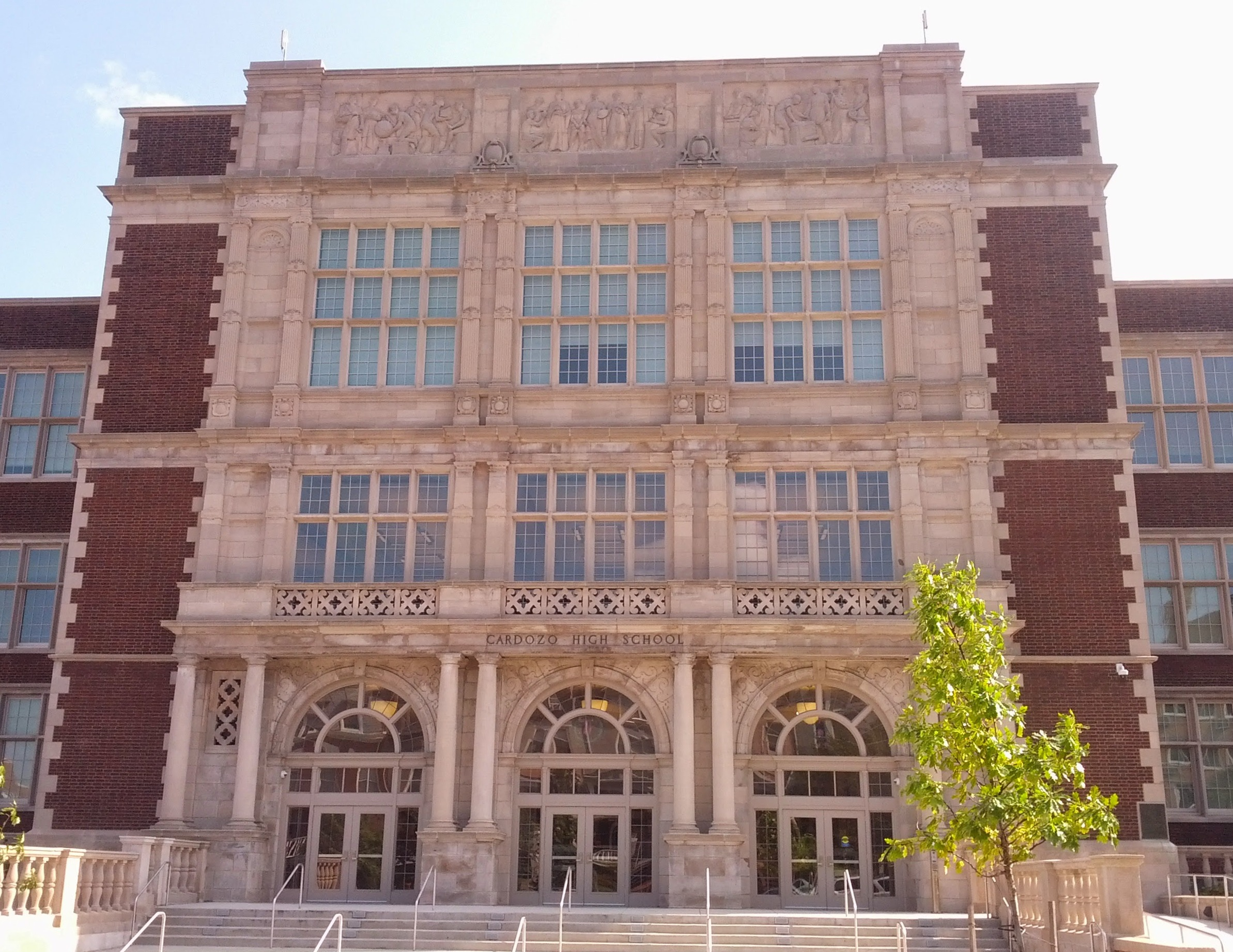
Cardozo Education Campus

The neighborhood was featured in various clips, and as the home of protagonists Helen and Bobby Benson, in the 1951 film The Day the Earth Stood Still.

In 1968, following the assassination of Martin Luther King Jr., the 1968 Washington, D.C., riots ravaged the 14th Street corridor in Columbia Heights, along with the commercial U Street corridor nearby, and many other Washington neighborhoods to the east. Many middle-class residents moved out to the suburbs, resulting in a drop in business. As a result, many homes and shops remained vacant for decades. In addition to Black people, the neighborhood had an increasing number of Latino immigrants and their descendants as residents.

=== 21st century ===
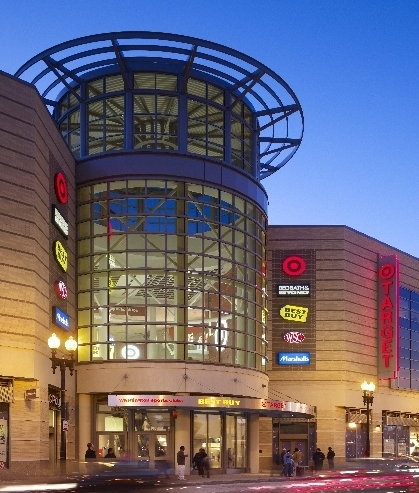
DC USA, a mall that opened in 2008.

In 1999, the city announced a revitalization initiative for the neighborhood focused around Metro’s Columbia Heights station, which opened in September of that year. The opening of the Metro station served as a catalyst for the return of economic development and residents.

Nearby, Giant Food supermarket opened, and Tivoli Square, a commercial and entertainment complex, dating from the 1920s was renovated.

There had already been positive developments along lower 14th Street and the U Street corridor.

On March 5, 2008, DC USA, a 546,000-square-foot (50,700 m^{2}) shopping mall across the street from the Columbia Heights Metro station opened. It includes many stores and restaurants as well as 1,000 spaces of underground parking.

As of 2018, approximately 22% of the housing stock in the neighborhood was reserved for low income renters.

== Geography ==
In the Northwest quadrant of Washington, D.C., Columbia Heights borders the neighborhoods of U Street (Cardozo), Shaw, Adams Morgan, Meridian Hill, Mount Pleasant, Park View, Pleasant Plains, and Petworth. On the eastern side is Howard University. The streets defining the neighborhood's boundaries are 16th Street to the west, Spring Road to the north; Sherman Ave to the east, and Florida Avenue to the south. It is served by the Columbia Heights station on the Green Line of the Washington Metro.

== Demographics ==
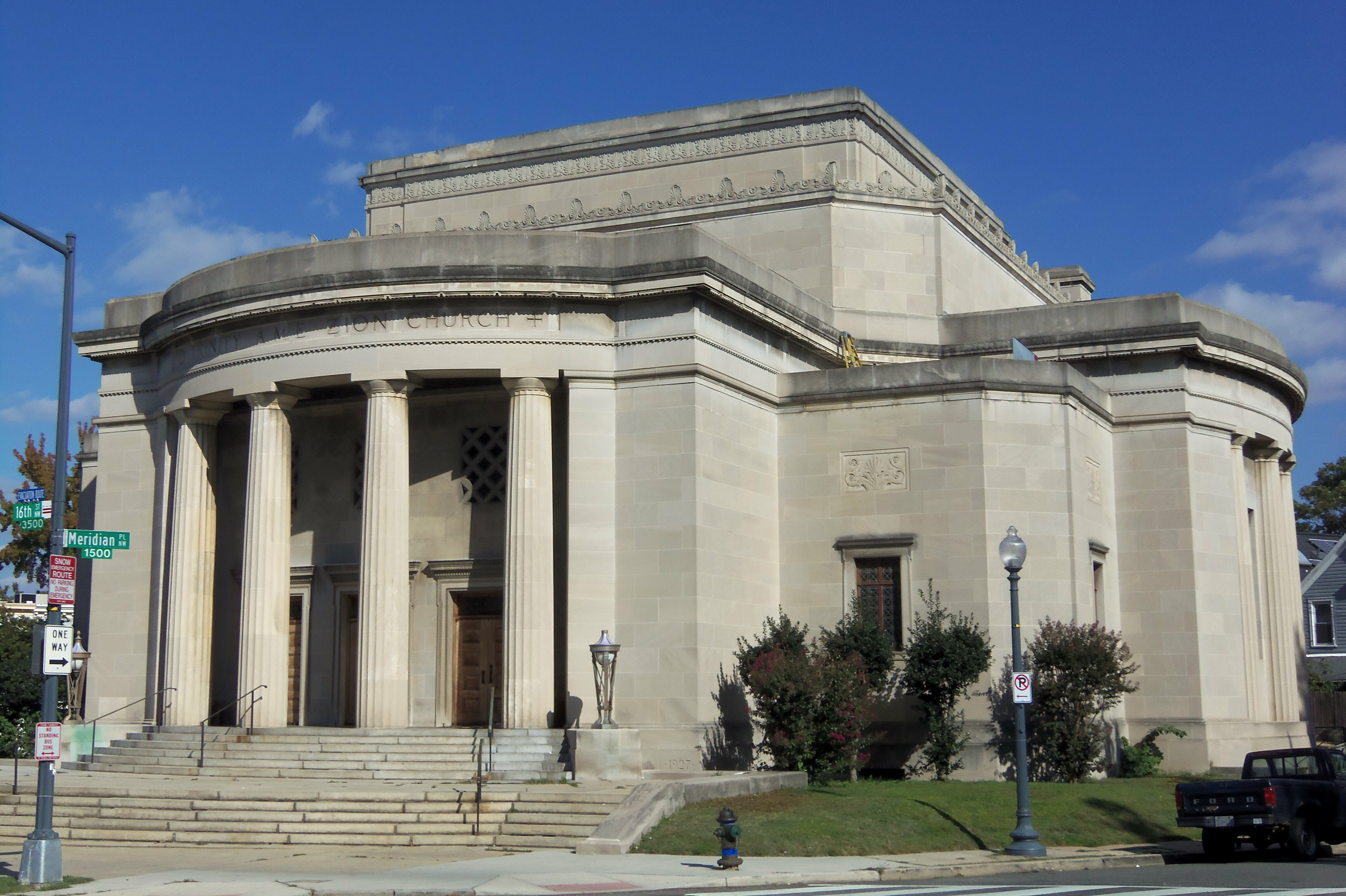
Trinity AME Zion Church

The 2000 census figures estimated Columbia Heights had a 58% African-American population; 34% Hispanic population; 5.4% white population; and 3.1% other.

The 2010 census figures estimated Columbia Heights had a 43.5% African-American population; 28.1% Hispanic population; 22.9% White population; 3.2% Asian population; and a 2% Other population.

In 2012, Columbia Heights was named one of the fastest gentrifying neighborhoods in the United States.

== Landmarks ==
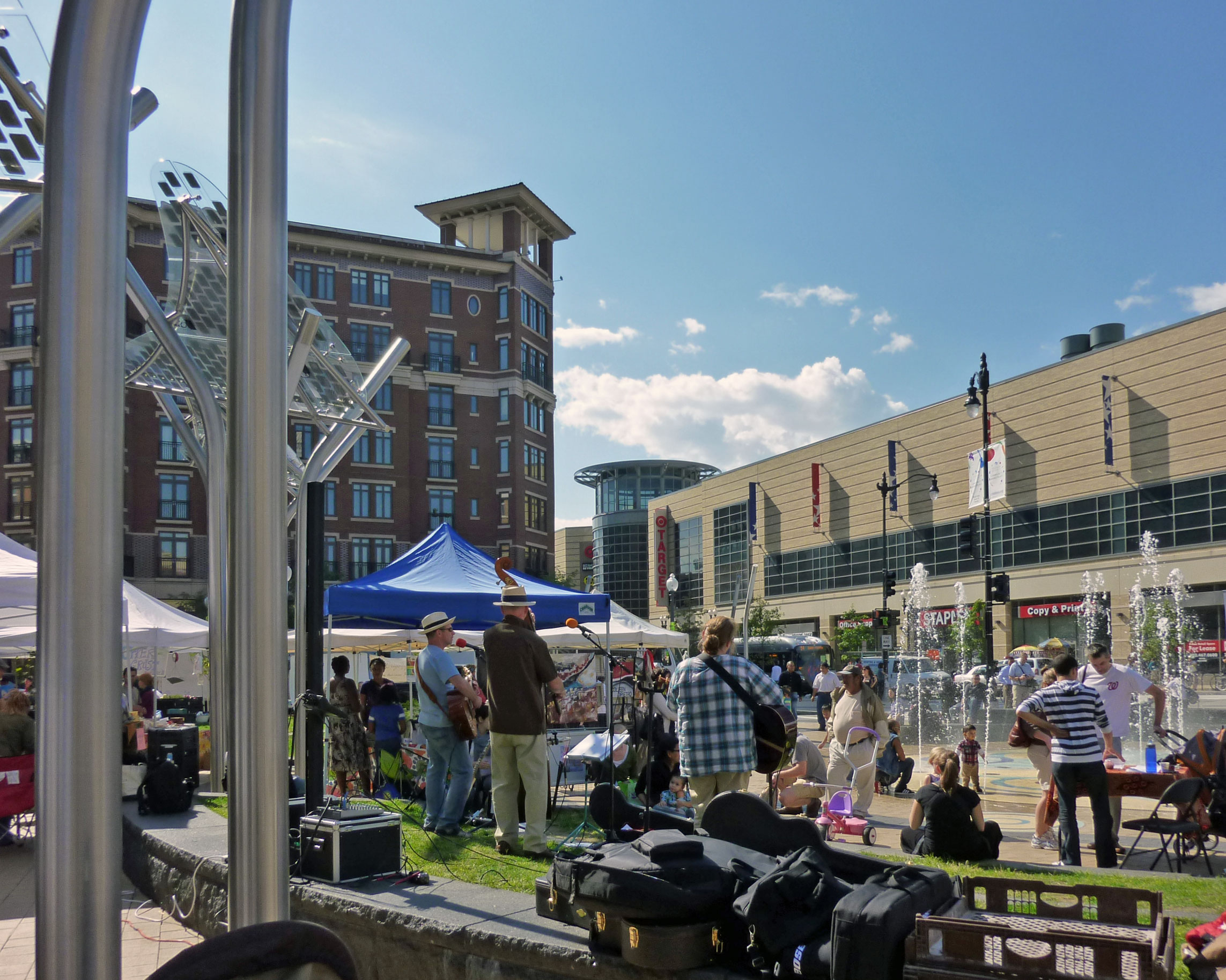
Columbia Heights Civic Plaza

The Columbia Heights Farmers Market, across the street from DC USA, provides neighborhood shoppers with locally produced food.

In January 2005, the GALA Hispanic Theatre moved into the newly refurbished Tivoli Theatre as its first permanent home. This former movie theater, built in 1924, had been vacant since 1976. GALA is a theater company dedicated since the 1970s to performing Spanish-language plays.

In November 2006, the Dance Institute of Washington, a minority-led professional ballet and dance center, opened a 12,000-square-foot (1,100 m^{2}) facility across the street from the Tivoli Theatre.

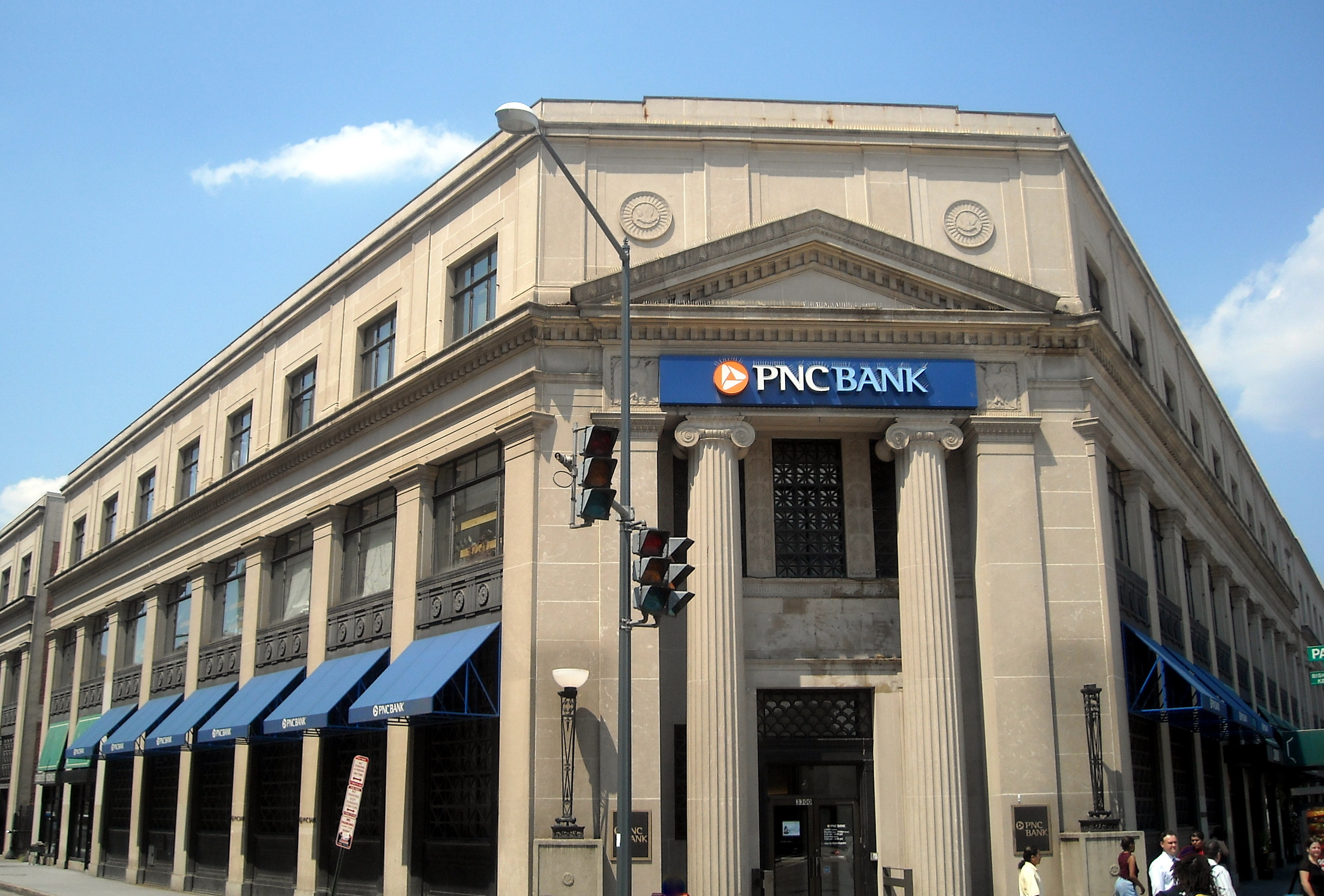
The Riggs–Tompkins Building

The neighborhood is also home to several organizations that serve minorities such as the Greater Washington Urban League, the local affiliate of the National Urban League, The Latin American Youth Center, CentroNia, Mexican Cultural Institute, and the Central American Resource Center (CARECEN).

The Embassy of Ecuador, Washington, D.C. is on 15th Street.

Notable historic structures in the neighborhood include the David White House, Mary Ann Shadd Cary House, Embassy Building No. 10, Meridian Manor, Olympia Apartments, Clifton Terrace, Hilltop Manor (The Cavalier Apartment Building), Trinity Towers, the Riggs–Tompkins Building, Park Road Courts, and Truck Company F.

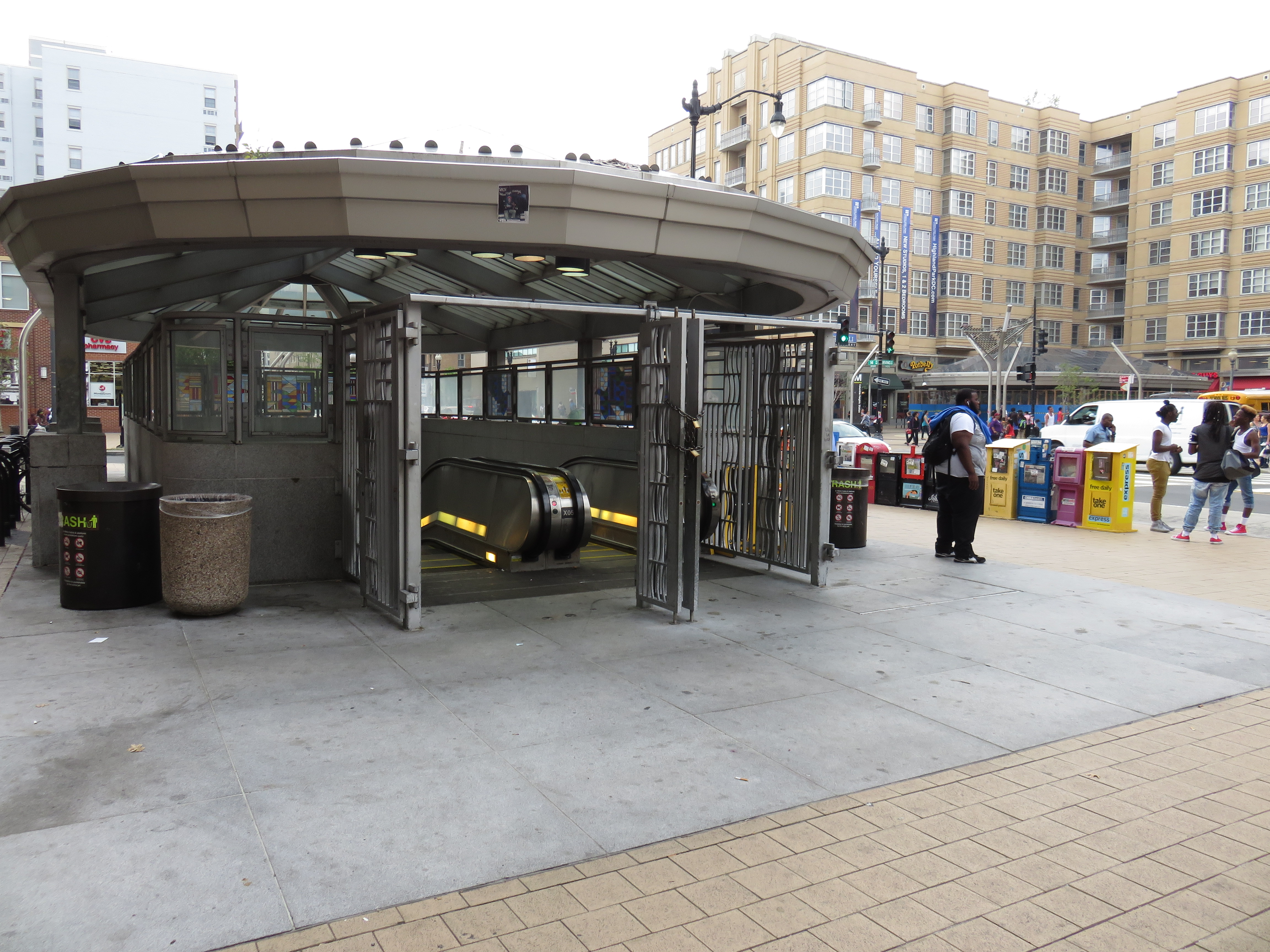
Columbia Heights station is served by Washington Metro's Green Line and Yellow Line.

The Banneker Community Center, a unit of the District of Columbia Department of Parks and Recreation, contains playing fields, Basketball courts, tennis courts, a swimming pool (Banneker pool), a computer lab and other indoor and outdoor facilities. The center's main building was constructed in 1934 near Howard University and named for Benjamin Banneker. It was listed on the National Register of Historic Places in 1986 because of its important role in the development of the black community in Washington, D.C.

Columbia Heights Green is a garden in a former wrecking yard. In 2010, Washington Parks and People purchased the land for $1. Community work days are every Saturday. The garden has community beds.

The Columbia Heights Day Festival is a one-day street festival is a celebration of the diversity and community of Columbia Heights.

== Education ==
Cardozo Education Campus, designed by William B. Ittner in 1928.

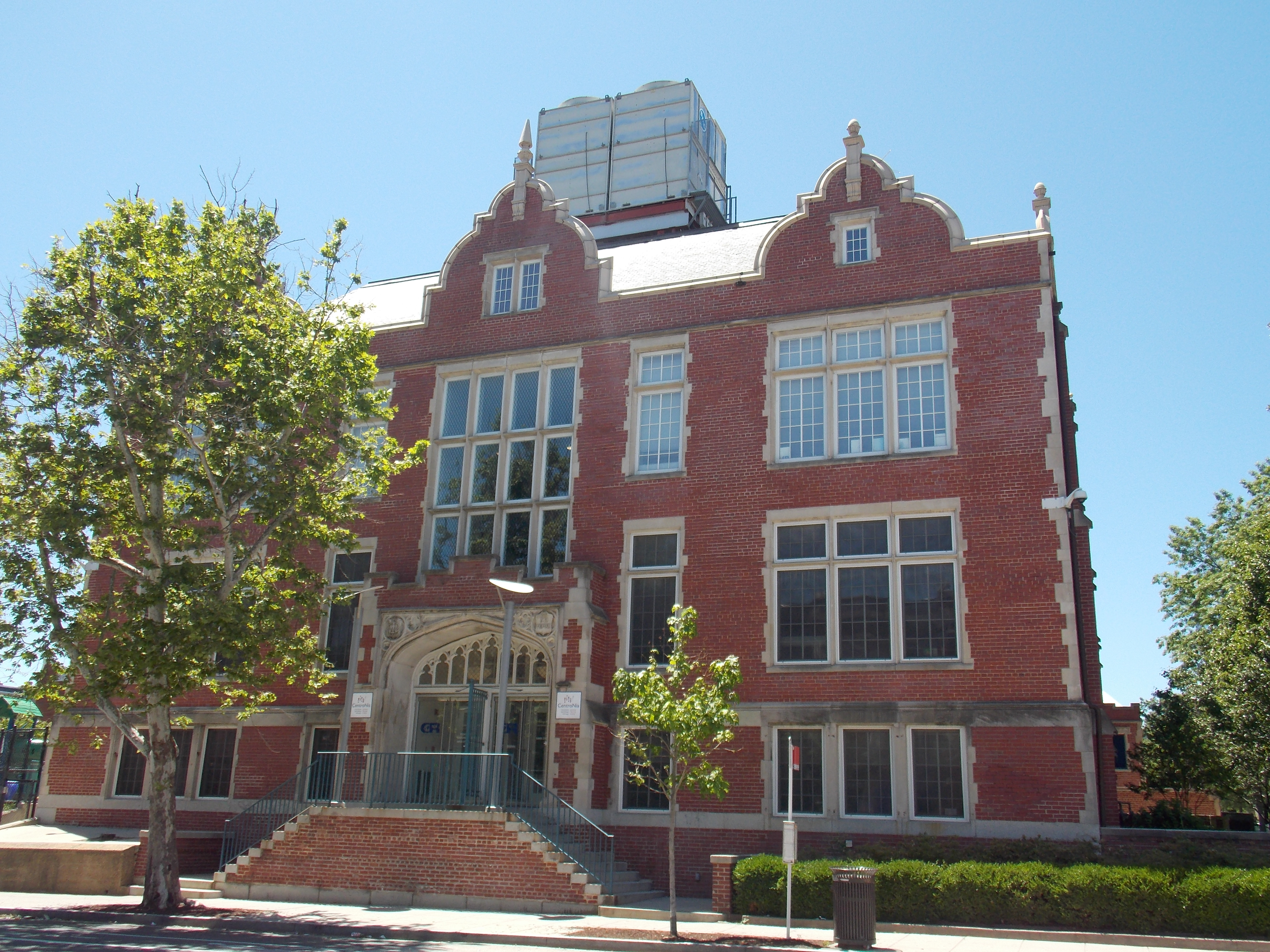
Carlos Rosario International Public Charter School.

District of Columbia Public Schools in Columbia Heights include:

High schools

- Cardozo Education Campus
- Benjamin Banneker Academic High School
- Bell Multicultural Senior High School
- Booker T. Washington Public Charter School for the Technical Arts

Middle schools

- Lincoln Middle School

Elementary schools

- Tubman Elementary School

Public Charter Schools

- DC Bilingual Public Charter School
- AppleTree Early Learning Public Charter School
- Capital City Public Charter School
- Carlos Rosario International Public Charter School
- Children's Studio Public Charter School
- E. L. Haynes Public Charter School
- YouthBuild Public Charter School
- The Next Step Public Charter School
- Booker T. Washington Public Charter School for the Technical Arts

== In popular culture ==
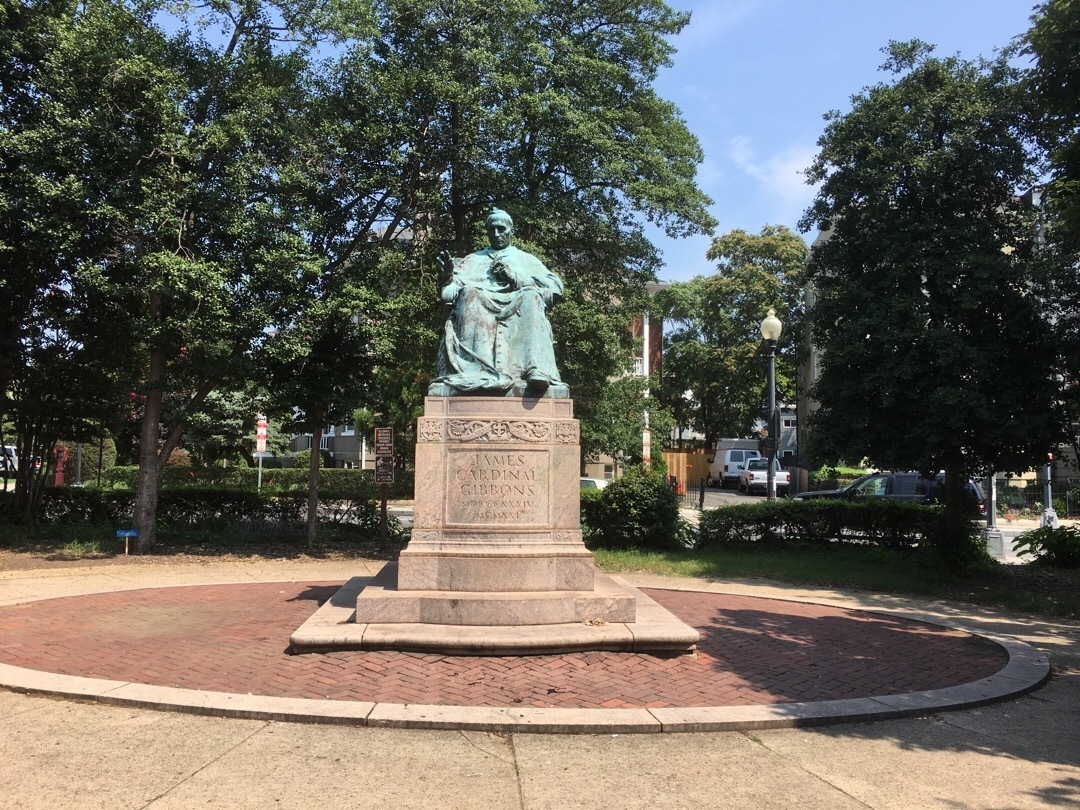
The Cardinal Gibbons Memorial honors James Gibbons, the last Archbishop of Baltimore to preside over D.C. before the establishment of the Archdiocese of Washington.

The 1993 film In the Line of Fire features a scene where a call from John Malkovich's character is traced to a building on Park Road. When Clint Eastwood's character and other police officers arrive on the street, they spot Malkovich walking past the Old Columbia Heights Firehouse and a chase ensues.

Klaatu, the alien in the 1951 film The Day the Earth Stood Still, played by Michael Rennie, boards in a house at 1412 Harvard Street for his stay in Washington.

In 2012, Columbia Heights was shown in Homeland, in season 2 episode 8.

== Notable residents ==
- Nick Altrock (1876–1965) - professional baseball player and coach
- Sekou Biddle - D.C. politician
- Jeannine Smith Clark (1928 – 2018) - educator and activist
- Djakarta - artist, comedian and actress
- Duke Ellington - jazz musician and composer, lived in Columbia Heights from 1919 to 1922. Purchased first house at 2728 Sherman Avenue NW.
- Marvin Gaye - musician; attended Cardozo Senior High School
- John A. Logan (1826-1886) - soldier and politician
- Eliseo J. Pérez-Stable - director of National Institute on Minority Health and Health Disparities
- Geovanny Vicente - columnist for CNN, teacher at Carlos Rosario International Public Charter School and Professor for Columbia University
- David Weigel - journalist for Semafor
- Stanley Woodward - attorney
