= Riggs–Tompkins Building =

- U.S. National Register of Historic Places
- D.C. Inventory of Historic Sites
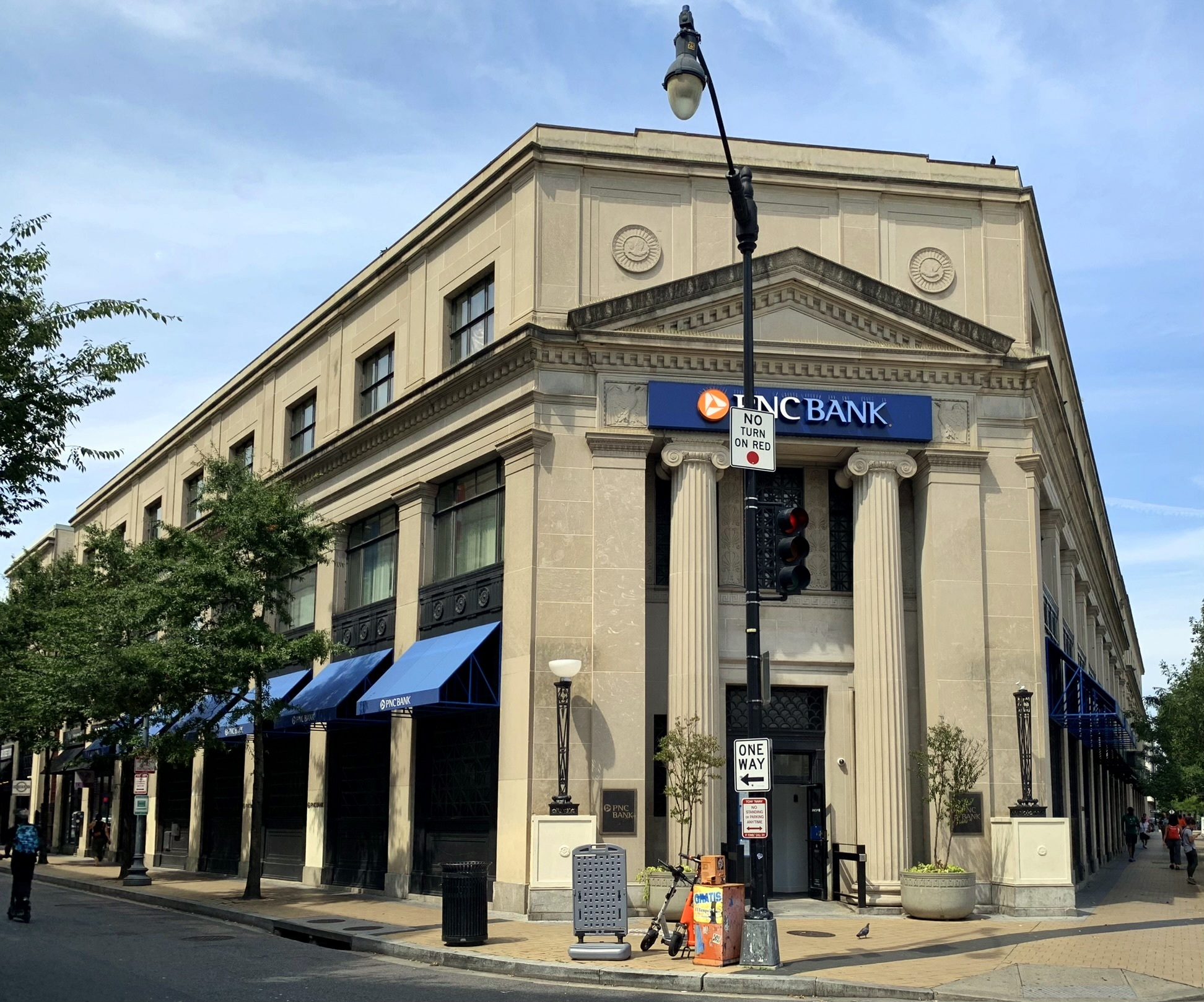
- Riggs–Tompkins Building in 2023

- Location within Washington, D.C.
- Location: 3300 14th Street., NW; Washington, D.C.
- Coordinates: 38°55′50″N 77°1′59″W
- Built: 1922
- Architect: George N. Ray
- Architectural style: Classical Revival
- NRHP reference No.: 86002915

Significant dates
- Added to NRHP: January 5, 1987
- Designated DCIHS: June 17, 1985

The Riggs–Tompkins Building is an historic structure located in the Columbia Heights neighborhood of Washington, D.C. George N. Ray designed the building that was completed in 1922. It has been listed on the District of Columbia Inventory of Historic Sites since 1985 and it was listed on the National Register of Historic Places in 1987.
