= Djakarta (artist) =

American contemporary artist, comedian, and actress

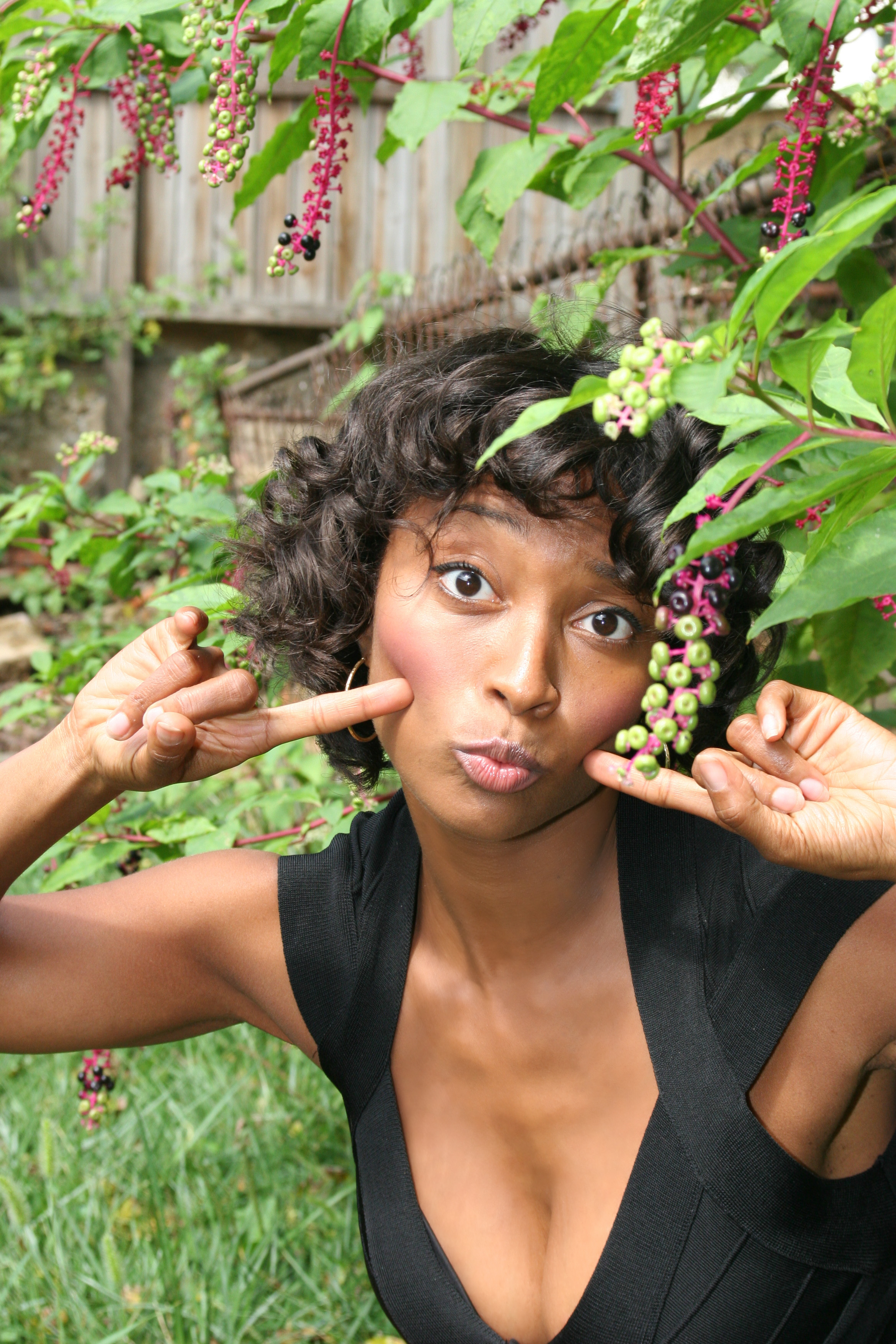
- Born: Djakarta Jacobs
- Other name: Deena Jacobs
- Education: Duke Ellington School of the Arts; Trinity Washington University; Corcoran College of Art and Design
- Occupations: Actress, artist, comedian

Djakarta Jacobs, better known mononymously as Djakarta, is an American contemporary artist, comedian and actress. She is often mistaken for a persona she developed named "Deena Jacobs," who has appeared on numerous reality shows including Divorce Court, Dr. Drew’s Lifechangers, RuPaul's Drag U and H8R as well as her YouTube rants which are featured on blogs such as The Huffington Post, Perez Hilton, Bossip and Sister2Sister.

== Early life and education ==
Djakarta was born on February 29, 1975, and raised in Washington, D.C., in the Columbia Heights neighborhood. Her father, Charles W. Jacobs, was a calligrapher who co-ran the Galerie Triangle art gallery with her mother, Averille E Jacobs, from their home. Her brother, Charles W. Jacobs Jr., is an architectural designer and adjunct professor at The Catholic University of America. She has been married to actor Erin Noyd since May 2013.

As a child, Djakarta studied acting at the Duke Ellington School of the Arts. She studied commercial photography at Edith Cowan University in Perth before transferring to the Corcoran College of Art and Design in D.C. She graduated in 2004 with a Bachelor of Fine Arts in photography. Her senior thesis was selected to be in the Conner Contemporary Arts Academy.

== Career ==
In 2006, Djakarta worked as a manager at the National Archives gift shop and was selected to introduce the new US $10 bill to the world. While working in the National Archives, she remained active in the city's art scene. As a visual artist, Djakarta was a member of the District of Columbia Arts Center Sparkplug arts collective and curated exhibitions for the Washington Project for the Arts. She received two grants from the DC Commission on the Arts and Humanities.

In 2004, her video work of Halle Berry was a featured artist in an exhibition held in the abandoned Capital Children's Museum called Artomatic. In 2005 her multimedia work titled Niggaz4Life (named after the N.W.A song of the same name) was showcased at the Transformer Gallery in D.C. The installation utilized an imaginary advertising campaign to encourage multiracial celebrities to embrace their membership in the black community. The gallery installation featured images of celebrities including Vin Diesel, Mariah Carey and Tiger Woods and a video featuring clips from films including Booty Call, Soul Plane, Bringing Down the House and Spike Lee's Bamboozled. In conjunction with the gallery display, the project involved a street art aspect as Djakarta pasted military recruitment-style posters that said "WE WANT YOU" above images of the celebrities framed in the colors red, green and black.

Her photographic series fiction was featured in the 2006 Janus exhibit held at the Maryland Art Place. In 2008, she was one of eleven artists to be featured in a show at the Arlington Arts Center called SHE'S SO ARTICULATE: Black Women Artists Reclaim the Narrative.

Djakarta moved to Los Angeles in 2008 to pursue acting. She established her production the New American Divas production company in 2009. In 2010, she appeared in the Company of Angels production Downtown Curren(t)cy: Lives Looking for Change. The same year, she produced I’m an Actor, They Don’t Get It through New American Divas at the Stella Adler Theater. In 2011, she appeared in two plays for the Towne Street Theatre 4th Annual Ten-Minute Play Festival: Social Science and I Dream of Emmett Till.

=== Deena Jacobs ===
In 2010, Djakarta began appearing on reality television as Deena Jacobs, playing the role of the "Angry Black Woman." The character was inspired by Sacha Baron Cohen's Borat Sagdiyev. Deena Jacobs is known for her rants against pop culture figures, which Djakarta posts on her YouTube channel. Pop culture targets have included Kim Kardashian, Kanye West, Amber Rose, Rihanna, Chris Brown and Supernanny. Deena Jacobs has also appeared on various radio programs such as BlogTalkRadio and Power Talk with Lorraine Jacques-White.

In 2011, Deena Jacobs appeared on the CW program H8R as Kim Kardashian's "#1 hater." The appearance proved to confuse members of the blogosphere in regards to her authenticity and intentions. The same year, Deena Jacobs was a guest on an episode of Dr. Drew’s Lifechangers that focused on the topic of interracial dating.

After seeing the "Deena Jacobs" videos, Tyler the Creator hand-picked Djakarta to play reoccurring character Tabbey Tarnetta on the Adult Swim sketch comedy show Loiter Squad.
