= Jeannine Smith Clark =

American educator and activist

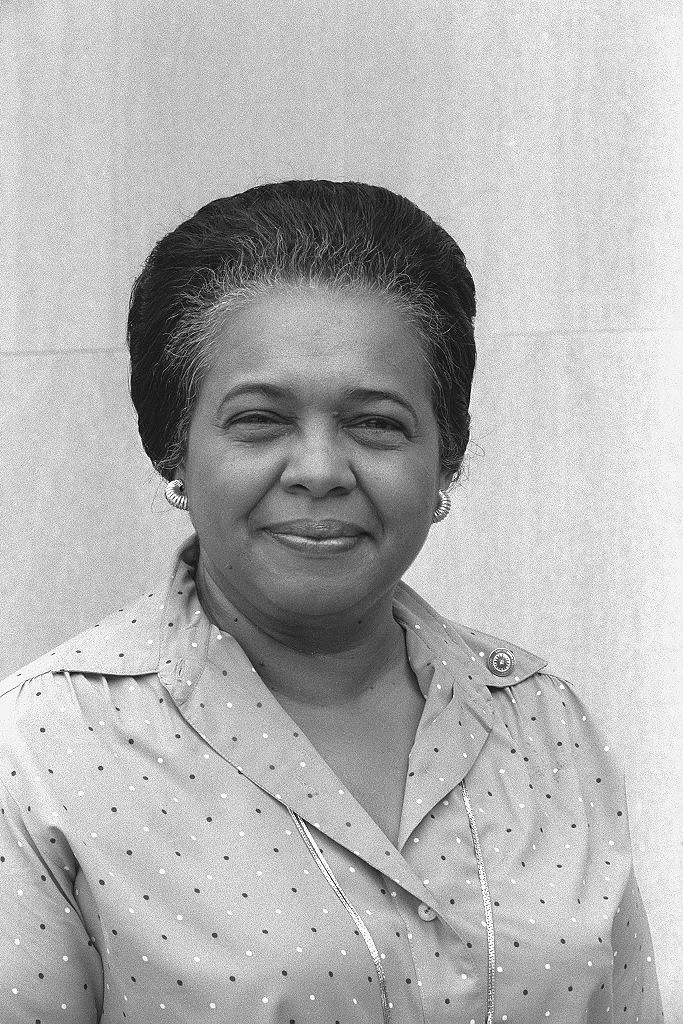
- Born: October 5, 1928
- Died: October 4, 2018

Jeannine Smith Clark (October 5, 1928 – October 4, 2018) was a Washington, D.C. educator and activist who served on the Board of Regents of the Smithsonian Institution from 1983 to 1994.

== Life and career ==
She was born Jeannine Smith, was the second of seven daughters of John Archibald Smith and Lorena Jackson Smith. A fifth-generation African-American Washingtonian, her family roots in Washington, D.C. stretched back to 1830. She grew up Columbia Heights and graduated from Dunbar High School.

Smith graduated from Howard University in 1950 with a B.A. in English and German. Through her sorority Alpha Kappa Alpha, she became involved in the American Human Rights Council, which campaigned for civil rights legislation, educational funding, and the protection of immigrants and agricultural and domestic workers.

Smith went on to graduate study of German at the University of Wisconsin, but returned after a year to marry Dr. Charles Howell Clark in 1951. She taught German at Dunbar High, but was forced to leave after she became pregnant, as at the time pregnant women were not allowed to teach after their first trimester. She had twins, a boy and a girl, and another son the following year.

From 1958 to 1963, through the National Defense Foreign Language Fellowship Program, she studied anthropology and Yoruba in the M.A. program for African Studies at Howard. Following graduation, she spent three years at the National Urban League directing their Leadership Development Project for young black professionals.

In 1971 she unsuccessfully ran for the DC School Board as a Republican. She was criticized for using the bulk mailing permit of a DC junior high for mailing campaign flyers. She was appointed to the DC Republican Central Committee and was a delegate to the Republican National Convention in 1976 and 1980. Democratic DC Mayors Walter Washington and Marion Barry appointed her to the Mayor’s Committee on Child Abuse (1976) and the DC Board of Elections and Ethics (1981), respectively.

Clark also engaged in volunteer work and received numerous accolades. She was named the founding chair of the Howard University Hospital Advisory Board, chair of the DC United Way, and “Mother of the Year" in 1982 by the DC Federation of Civic Associations.

== Smithsonian Institution ==
Her long association with the Smithsonian began in 1968, when she was asked to volunteer to coordinate a tour of the Smithsonian for children from Resurrection City. That tour never happened, but she did lead a similar tour for inner city schoolchildren. She went on to be a docent for countless tours of schoolchildren through the Africa Hall at the National Museum of Natural History.

In 1972, she joined the Smithsonian Women’s Committee, a volunteer fundraising group, and chaired the Committee from 1979 to 1981. The Committee has raised millions for Smithsonian programming, including significant efforts researching and teaching African-American history.

In 1983, she was invited to join the Smithsonian Board of Regents and served two six-year terms. Her most important role on the Board was becoming the founding chair of the Cultural Education Committee in 1986. The CEC was formed to increase minority visitation and participation at the Smithsonian, and to encourage hiring of and programming about people of color at the largely white institution. The CEC's work included establishing an annual Martin Luther King, Jr. birthday celebration at the Smithsonian and increasing programming for various commemorative heritage months.

== Death ==
Jeannine Smith Clark died on October 4, 2018, the day before her 90th birthday.
