= Pygmephoridae =

Scientific classification
- Kingdom: Animalia
- Phylum: Arthropoda
- Subphylum: Chelicerata
- Class: Arachnida
- Order: Trombidiformes
- Family: Pygmephoridae

Family of mites

The Pygmephoridae are a family of mites, in the order Trombidiformes.
