= History of plant systematics =

Development of understanding of relationships among plants

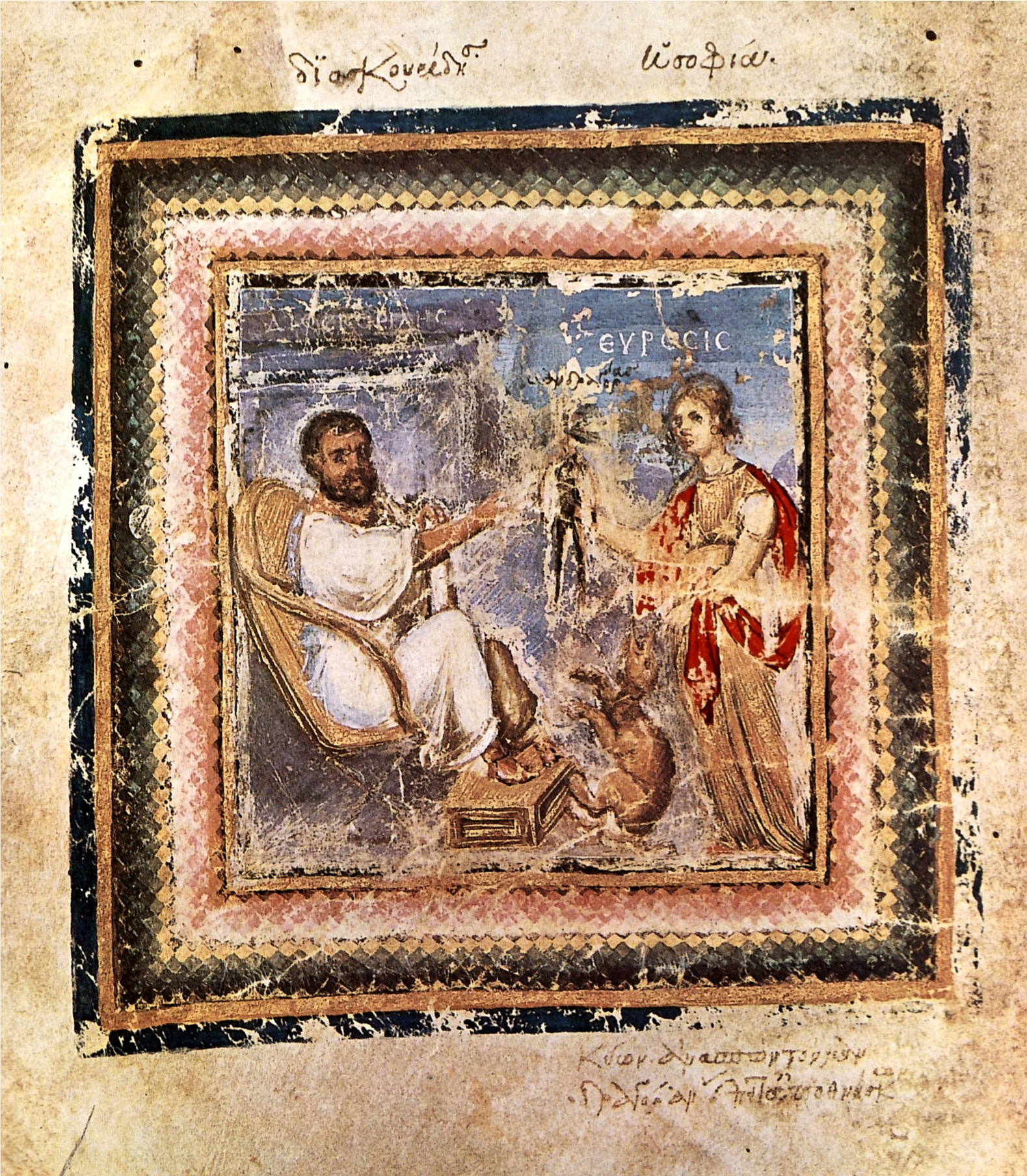
The Vienna Dioscurides manuscript of De Materia Medica, from the early sixth century, is one of the oldest herbals in existence. Dioscorides wrote the book between 50 and 60 AD.

The history of plant systematics—the biological classification of plants—stretches from the work of ancient Greek to modern evolutionary biologists. As a field of science, plant systematics came into being only slowly, early plant lore usually being treated as part of the study of medicine. Later, classification and description was driven by natural history and natural theology. Until the advent of the theory of evolution, nearly all classification was based on the scala naturae. The professionalization of botany in the 18th and 19th centuries marked a shift toward more holistic classification methods, eventually based on evolutionary relationships.

== Antiquity ==
The peripatetic philosopher Theophrastus (372–287 BC), as a student of Aristotle in Ancient Greece, wrote Historia Plantarum, the earliest surviving treatise on plants, where he listed the names of over 500 plant species. He did not articulate a formal classification scheme, but relied on the common groupings of folk taxonomy combined with growth form: tree shrub; undershrub; or herb.

The De Materia Medica of Dioscorides was an important early compendium of plant descriptions (over five hundred), classifying plants chiefly by their medicinal effects.

== Medieval ==
The Byzantine emperor Constantine VII sent a copy of Dioscorides' pharmacopeia to the Umayyad Caliph Abd al-Rahman III who ruled Córdoba in the 9th century, and also sent a monk named Nicolas to translate the book into Arabic. It was in use from its publication in the 1st century until the 16th century, making it one of the major herbals throughout the Middle Ages. The taxonomy criteria of medieval texts is different from what is used today. Plants with similar external appearance were usually grouped under the same species name, though in modern taxonomy they are considered different.

Abū l-Khayr's botanical work is the most complete Andalusi botanical text known to modern scholars. It is noted for its detailed descriptions of plant morphology and phenology.

== Early modern period ==
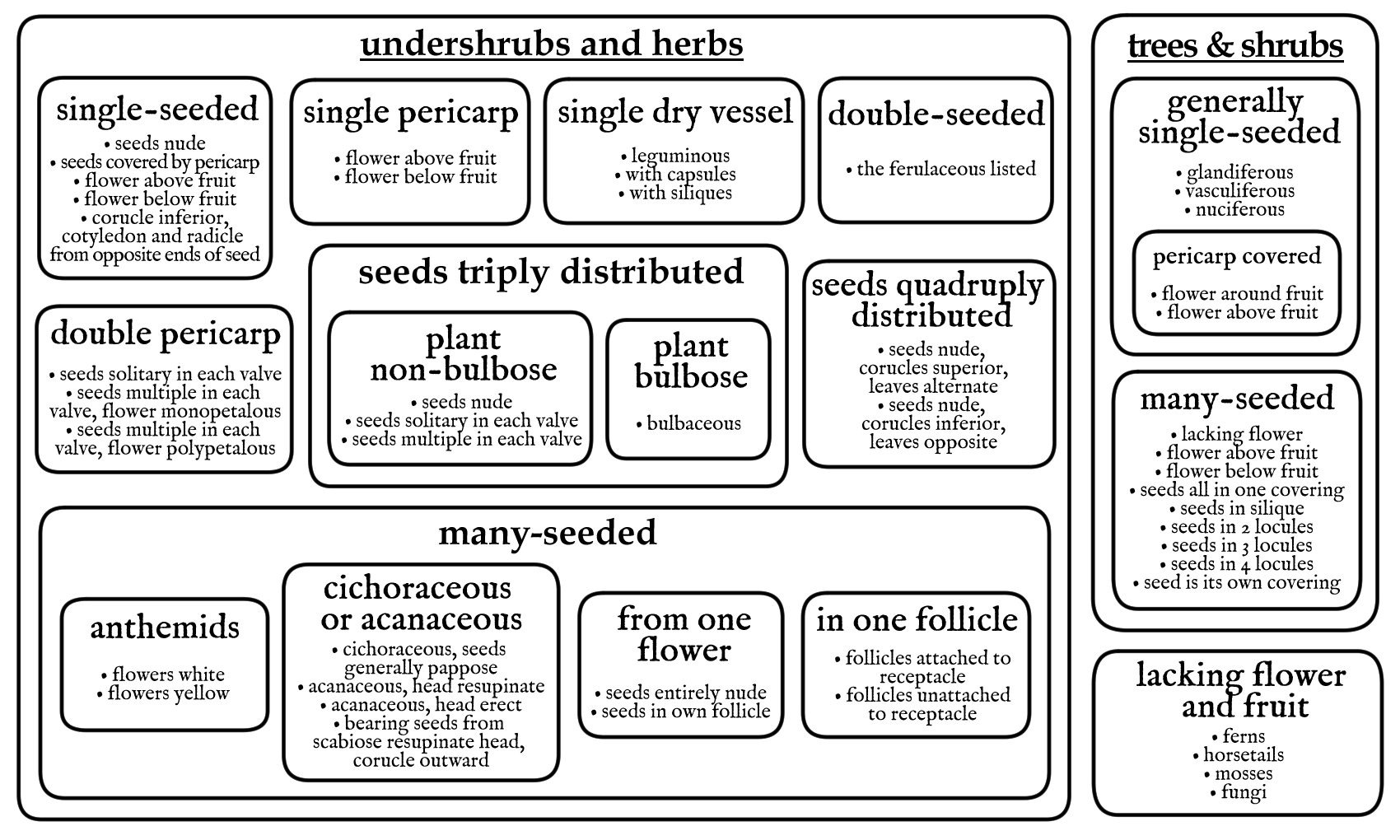
Summary of Taxonomy of Plantae (L.) by Andrea Caesalpino, published in De Plantis Libri XVI (1583). Referenced from Classes Plantarum (Carl Linnaeus, 1738).

In the 16th century, works by Otto Brunfels, Hieronymus Bock, and Leonhart Fuchs helped to revive interest in natural history based on first-hand observation; Bock in particular included environmental and life cycle information in his descriptions. With the influx of exotic species in the Age of Exploration, the number of known species expanded rapidly, but most authors were far more interested in the medicinal properties of individual plants than an overarching classification system. Later influential Renaissance books include those of Caspar Bauhin and Andrea Cesalpino. Bauhin described over 6000 plants, which he arranged into 12 books and 72 sections based on a wide range of common characteristics. Cesalpino based his system on the structure of the organs of fructification, using the Aristotelian technique of logical division.

In the late 17th century, the most influential classification schemes were those of English botanist and natural theologian John Ray and French botanist Joseph Pitton de Tournefort. Ray, who listed over 18,000 plant species in his works, is credited with establishing the monocot/dicot division and some of his groups—mustards, mints, legumes and grasses—stand today (though under modern family names). Tournefort used an artificial system based on logical division which was widely adopted in France and elsewhere in Europe up until Linnaeus.

The book that had an enormous accelerating effect on the science of plant systematics was Species Plantarum (1753) by Linnaeus. It presented a complete list of the plant species then known to Europe, ordered for the purpose of easy identification using the number and arrangement of the male and female sexual organs of the plants. Of the groups in this book, the highest rank that continues to be used today is the genus. The consistent use of binomial nomenclature along with a complete listing of all plants provided a huge stimulus for the field.

Although meticulous, the classification of Linnaeus served merely as an identification manual; it was based on phenetics and did not regard evolutionary relationships among species. It assumed that plant species were given by God and that what remained for humans was to recognise them and use them (a Christian reformulation of the scala naturae or Great Chain of Being). Linnaeus was quite aware that the arrangement of species in the Species Plantarum was not a natural system, i.e. did not express relationships. However he did present some ideas of plant relationships elsewhere.

== Modern and contemporary periods ==
Significant contributions to plant classification came from de Jussieu (inspired by the work of Michel Adanson) in 1789 and the early nineteenth century saw the start of work by de Candolle, culminating in the Prodromus.

A major influence on plant systematics was the theory of evolution (Charles Darwin published Origin of Species in 1859), resulting in the aim to group plants by their phylogenetic relationships. To this was added the interest in plant anatomy, aided by the use of the light microscope and the rise of chemistry, allowing the analysis of secondary metabolites.

Currently, the strict use of epithets in botany, although regulated by international codes, is considered unpractical and outdated. The very notion of species, the fundamental classification unit, is often up to subjective intuition and thus can not be well defined. As a result, estimate of the total number of existing "species" (ranging from 2 million to 100 million) becomes a matter of preference.

While scientists have agreed for some time that a functional and objective classification system must reflect actual evolutionary processes and genetic relationships, the technological means for creating such a system did not exist until recently. In the 1990s DNA technology saw immense progress, resulting in unprecedented accumulation of DNA sequence data from various genes present in compartments of plant cells. In 1998 a ground-breaking classification of the angiosperms (the APG system) consolidated molecular phylogenetics (and especially cladistics or phylogenetic systematics) as the best available method. For the first time relatedness could be measured in real terms, namely similarity of the molecules comprising the genetic code.

== Timeline of publications ==
- Theophrastus. Historia Plantarum.
- Dioscorides, Plinius. De Materia Medica.
- Cesalpino, Andrea (1583). De plantis libri XVI.
- Ray, John (1686). Historia Plantarum.
- Linnaeus, Carl (1753). Species Plantarum.
- Adanson, Michel (1763). Familles des plantes. Vincent.
- de Jussieu; Antoine Laurent (1789). Genera Plantarum, secundum ordines naturales disposita juxta methodum in Horto Regio Parisiensi exaratam. apud viduam Herissant, typographum, viâ novâ B. M. sub signo Crucis aureæ.
- de Candolle; A. P.; et al. (1824–1873). Prodromus systemati naturalis regni vegetabilis sive enumeratio contracta ordinum, generum specierumque plantarum huc usque cognitarum, juxta methodi naturalis normas digesta.
- Lindley, John (1846). The Vegetable Kingdom. (In English, with list of systems since 1703 (John Ray) until 1845)

== See also ==
- History of botany
- Conservation movement
- Environmental protection
- Ethnobotany
- Automated species identification
- Pl@ntNet
