= Organic computer =

Organic computer may refer to:

- Wetware computer, a computer made from biological materials
- Organic computing, an emerging computing paradigm in which a system and its components and subsystems are well coordinated in a purposeful manner
