= Trieenea =

Scientific classification
- Kingdom: Plantae
- Clade: Tracheophytes
- Clade: Angiosperms
- Clade: Eudicots
- Clade: Asterids
- Order: Lamiales
- Family: Scrophulariaceae
- Tribe: Limoselleae
- Genus: Trieenea; Hilliard

Genus of flowering plants

Trieenea is a genus of flowering plants belonging to the family Scrophulariaceae. It is also in Tribe Leucophylleae.

It was named in reference to renowned South African botanist and plant collector, Elsie Elizabeth Esterhuysen, the prefix Tri- and the three letters e in the generic epithet being for the three initials of her name. It was first described and published in Notes Roy. Bot. Gard. Edinburgh Vol.45 on page 489 (1988, published in 1989).

It is native to the Northern, Western and Eastern Cape Provinces within the Republic of South Africa.

== Known species ==
According to Kew:

- Trieenea elsiae Hilliard
- Trieenea frigida Hilliard
- Trieenea glutinosa (Schltr.) Hilliard
- Trieenea lanciloba Hilliard
- Trieenea lasiocephala Hilliard
- Trieenea laxiflora Hilliard
- Trieenea longipedicellata Hilliard
- Trieenea occulta J.C.Manning & Goldblatt
- Trieenea schlechteri (Hiern) Hilliard
- Trieenea taylorii Hilliard
