= Mark A. O'Neill =

English computational biologist

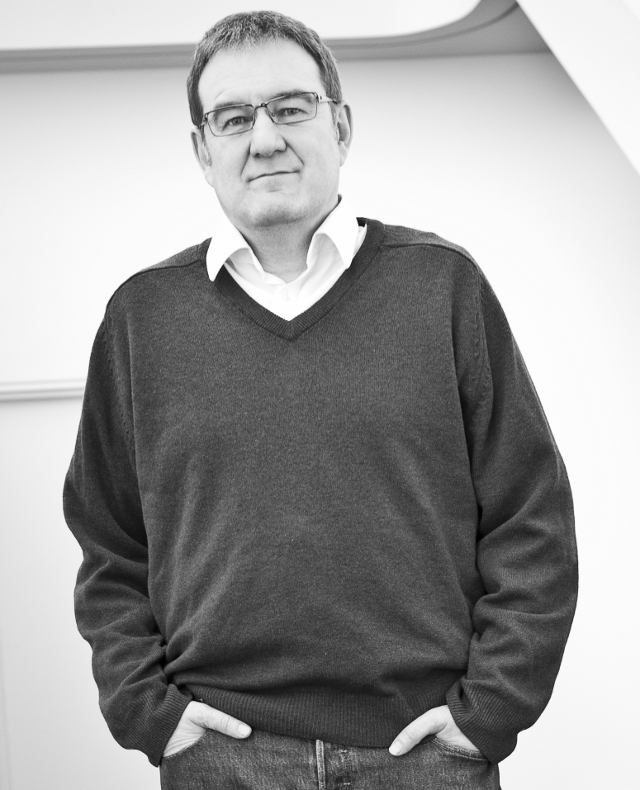
- O'Neill in 2011
- Born: Grantham, Lincolnshire, United Kingdom
- Education: University of London, University of Sheffield
- Known for: Digital Automated Identification SYstem (DAISY), PUPS P3
- Scientific career
- Fields: ecological modelling, computational neuroscience, complex systems, machine vision
- Workplaces: Cambridge University, University College London, Oxford University
- Doctoral advisor: Ian Dowman
- Other academic advisors: G. Paul Otto, Peter Rounce
- Notable students: Claus C. Hilgetag, Sarah E. Barlow, Daniel T. Reed

Mark A. O'Neill is an English computational biologist with interests in artificial intelligence, systems biology, complex systems and image analysis. He is the creator and lead programmer on a number of computational projects including the Digital Automated Identification SYstem (DAISY) for automated species identification and PUPS P3, an organic computing environment for Linux.

== Education ==
O'Neill was educated at The King's School, Grantham, Sheffield University and University College London.

== Research interests ==
O'Neill's interests lie at the interface of biology and computing. He has worked in the areas of artificial life and biologically inspired computing. In particular, he has attempted to answer the question "can one create software agents which are capable of carrying a useful computational payload which respond to their environment with the flexibility of a living organism?"

He has also investigated how computational methods may be used to analyze biological and quasi biological systems for example: ecosystems and economies.

O'Neill is also interested in ethology, especially the emergent social ecosystems which occur as a result of social networking on the internet. His recent projects include the use of artificial intelligence techniques to look at complex socio-economic data.

On the computer science front, O'Neill continues to develop and contribute to a number of other open source and commercial software projects and is involved in the design of cluster/parallel computer hardware via his company, Tumbling Dice Ltd. Long-running projects include DAISY; PUPS P3 an organic computing environment for Linux; Cryopid, a Linux process freezer; the [Mensor digital terrain model generation system]; and RanaVision, a vision based motion detection system. He has also worked with public domain agent based social interaction models such as Sugarscape and artificial life simulators, for example physis, which is a development of Tierra.

O'Neill has been a keen naturalist since childhood. In addition to his interests in complex systems and computer science, he is a member of the Royal Entomological Society and an expert in the rearing and ecology of hawk moths. He is also currently convenor of the [Electronic and Computing Technology Special Interest Group] (SIG) for the Royal Entomological Society.

He is also interested in the use of precision agriculture methodologies to monitor agri-ecosystems, and has been an active participant in a series of projects looking at the automatic tracking of bumblebees, and other insects using vision, and using both network analysis and remote sensing techniques to monitor ecosystem health. Latterly, he has become interested in applying these techniques in the commercial sphere to look at issues of corporate responsibility and sustainability in industries like mining and agriculture which have significant ecological footprints.

He has also been involved in both computational neuroscience and systems biology, the former association resulting in many papers while working at Oxford University. Work in the latter area led to the successful flotation in 2007 of a systems biology company, e-Therapeutics, where O'Neill was a senior scientist, assisted with the establishment of the company, and was named in a number of seminal patents.

O'Neill is a fellow of the British Computer Society, the Institute of Engineering and Technology, and the Royal Astronomical Society. He is also a chartered engineer, a chartered IT professional and a member of the Institute of Directors. He was one of the recipients of the BCS Award for Computing Technology in 1992.

== Publications ==
- Mark A. O'Neill publications indexed by Google Scholar
- ORCID 0000-0002-7042-690X
