= Identification (biology) =

Process of taking existing name to single organisms

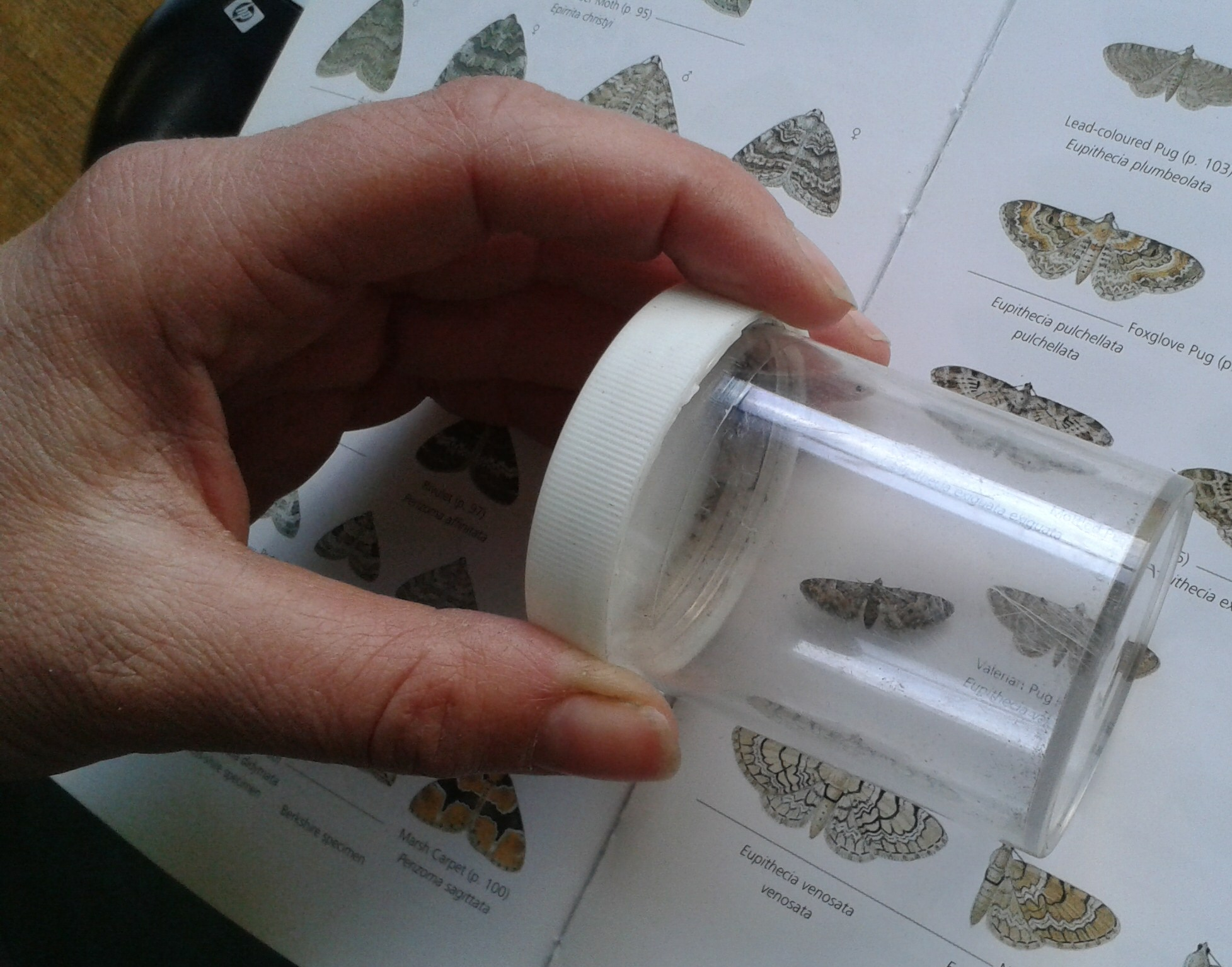
Identifying moths

Identification in biology is the process of assigning a pre-existing taxon name to an individual organism. Identification of organisms to individual scientific names (or codes) may be based on individualistic natural body features, experimentally created individual markers (e.g., color dot patterns), or natural individualistic molecular markers (similar to those used in maternity or paternity identification tests). Individual identification is used in ecology, wildlife management and conservation biology. The more common form of identification is the identification of organisms to common names (e. g., "lion") or scientific name (e. g., "Panthera leo"). By necessity this is based on inherited features ("characters") of the sexual organisms, the inheritance forming the basis of defining a class. The features may, e. g., be morphological, anatomical, physiological, behavioral, or molecular.

The term "determination" may occasionally be used as a synonym for identification (e. g.), or as in "determination slips".

Identification methods may be manual or computerized and may involve using identification keys, browsing through fields guide that contain (often illustrated) species accounts, comparing the organism with specimens from natural history collections, or taking images to be analyzed and compared against a pre-trained knowledge base with species information.

== See also ==
- Automated species identification
- DNA barcoding
- DNA profiling
- Molecular marker
- Taxonomy
