= RanaVision =

Rana
- Developer: Mark A. O'Neill
- Stable release: 2.00 / August 18, 2016; 9 years ago
- Written in: C
- Operating system: Linux
- Platform: IA-32 x86-64 ARM
- License: Proprietary commercial software
- Website: www.tumblingdice.co.uk/rana

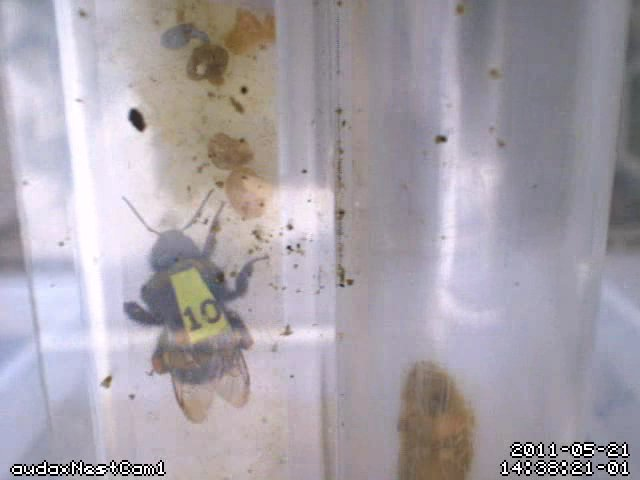
Still from a Rana installation monitoring a Bombus terrestris colony

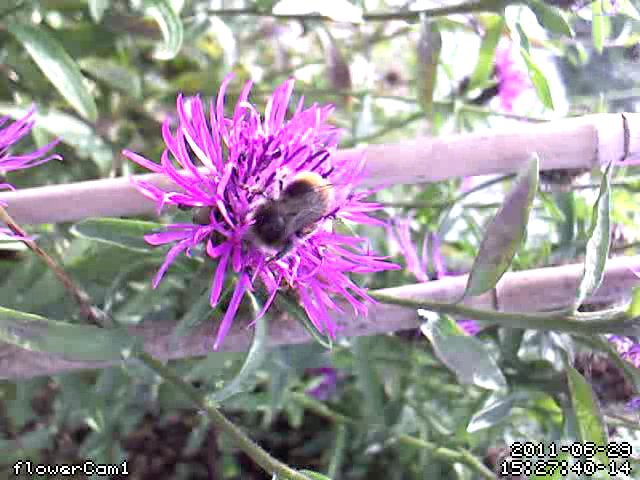
Still from a Rana installation monitoring a knapweed flower. A male Bombus lapidarius has been captured pollinating the flower

Rana motion vision system is a motion detection that uses vision to detect the presence of objects within its visual field. Rana is based on the open source motion package for Linux, but has significantly enhanced motion detection capabilities. It has been designed top operate as an efficient camera trap system for recording the movements of small invertebrates, capable of operating autonomously in the field for extended periods. To date, Rana has been used a number of projects looking eusocial hymenoptera including studies of bumblebee and hornet activity in the vicinity of their nests and of the behaviour of hover flies and other pollinators at flowers and as a general purpose e-ecology tool for the automated remote observation of plant-pollinator interactions in the field.

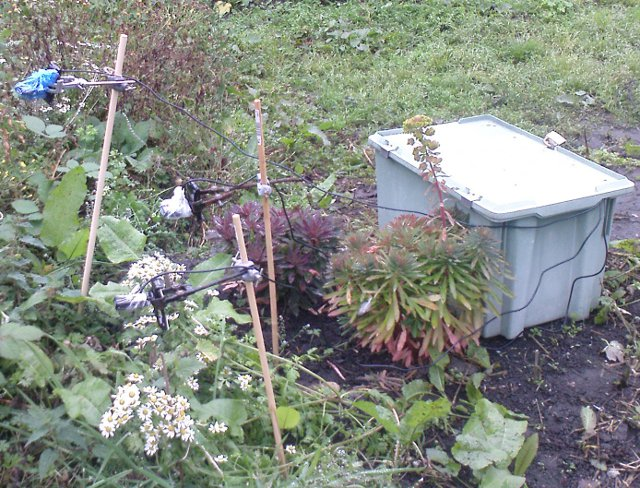
Prototype field deployable Rana prototype (in grey box) with three cameras (on bamboo poles) monitoring floral patch on an allotment

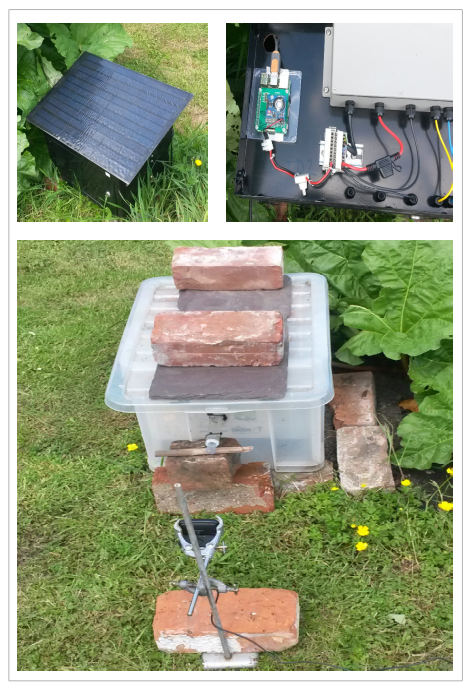
Showing the hardware components of a modern Rana system (top left) System box with solar panel on roof, (top right), showing detail of charge controller and Raspberry Pi data-logger inside system box, (bottom) showing typical bumblebee nest enclosure with nest entrance monitored by Logitech C525 USB camera

== Rana system setup ==
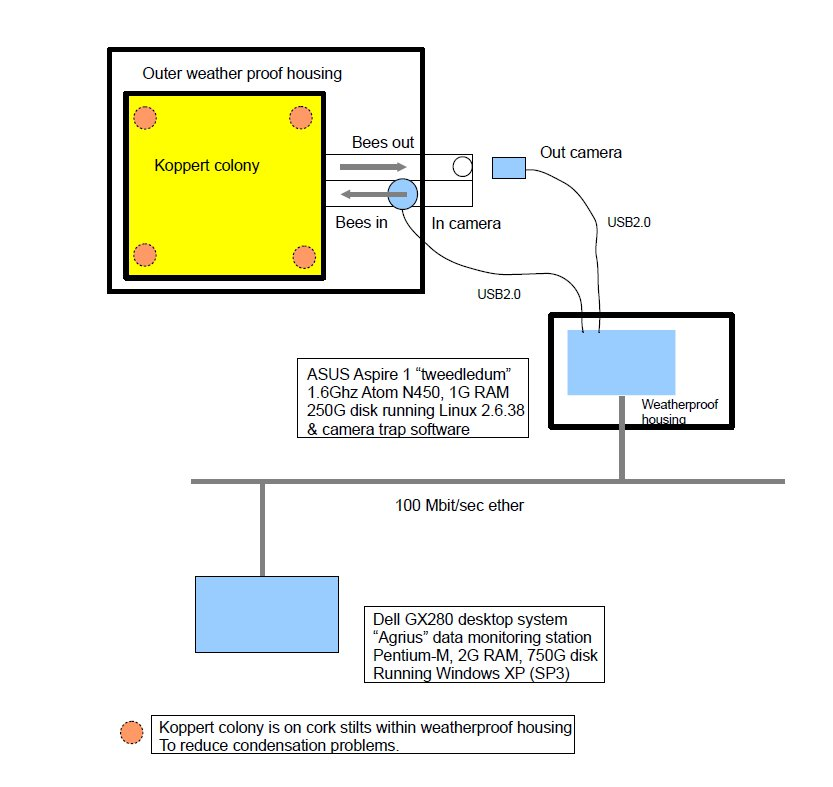
Schematic of typical Rana setup. In this case the movement of bumblebees in a colony is being monitored

Here we see a typical Rana setup for observing bumblebees in the vicinity of their colony. The colony is mounted on cork stilts inside an outer (plastic) weatherproof housing. Bees are channelled in and out of the nest via a one way system. Each channel is monitored using a Phillips SPC1330N autofocus USB camera which are connected to the Asus Aspire one data logging computer via USB 2.0 connections. This logging computer runs C code which implements a motion detector which is loosely modelled on the frog visual system (e.g. a blob detector which capable of detecting and tracking blobs of a user determined size). This motion code is running on top of a Linux kernel. This offers a relatively good real time performance on the relatively slow Atom N450 processor which was chosen to keep power consumption low (so the logger can operate stand-alone with solar panels in remote field locations). The data logger is connected to the outside world via 100 Mbit/second Ethernet (Wi-Fi and a mobile phone dongle could be substituted in remote field locations). The system is controlled via a web interface on a remote monitoring computer, smart phone or tablet. With high end cameras like the Phillips SPC1330N or the Logitech C270 it is possible to point and focus the cameras from the monitoring station too.

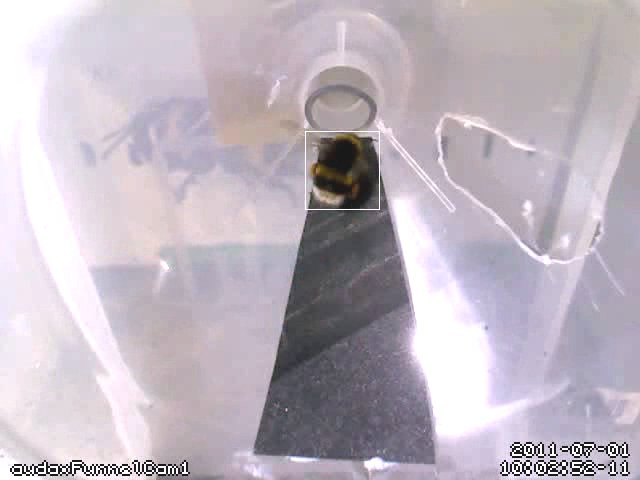
Showing Rana blob detection. The extent of the blob (a moving bee) is shown by the bounding rectangle

in addition to detecting moving blobs, the Rana system can also track the path of these blobs through its visual field. If required be split into a number of sub-fields within which blobs can be tracked independently. This permits a single camera to monitor a number of visual channels reducing system hardware complexity and expense.

Subsequently, Rana has been ported onto a number of low power ARM based devices such as the Raspberry Pi and Odroid [C1] and [C2] which can be operated off the grid in remote field locations.

Remote control of Rana (and live video streaming from the camera(s) monitored by Rana is accomplished via a web services interface. These systems have recently been used by researchers at the Royal Botanic Gardens Kew to monitor the activities of pollinators at floral patches both within Kew and also in the field in order to determine the pollinators of the rare Pasque Flower in the Chiltern Hills. In addition, it has also been used with near infra-red night vision cameras to monitor the activities of nocturnal invertebrates including cockroaches, moths and bed bugs. A recent [study ] by Red Butte Garden and Arboretum (University of Utah) has used the system to observe thousands of hours of plan-pollinator interactions in the Utah desert. Some representative footage from the Utah study is shown [here]. Rana was also showcased in the Red Butte Garden newsletters in [2016] and [2017].

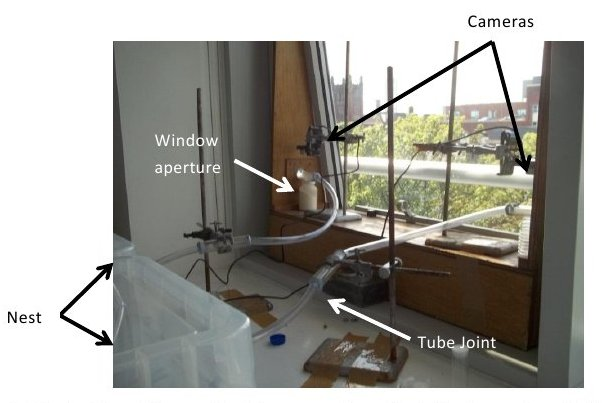
Showing Rana system monitoring multiple bumblebee nests

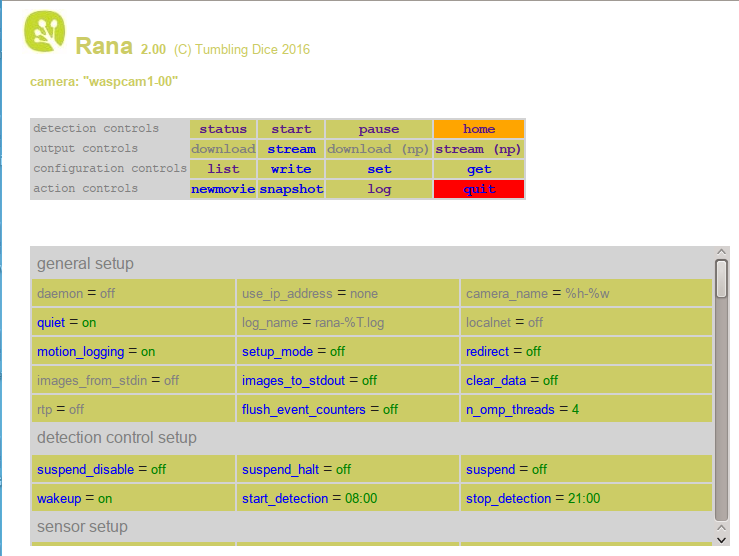
Showing Rana web services control panel

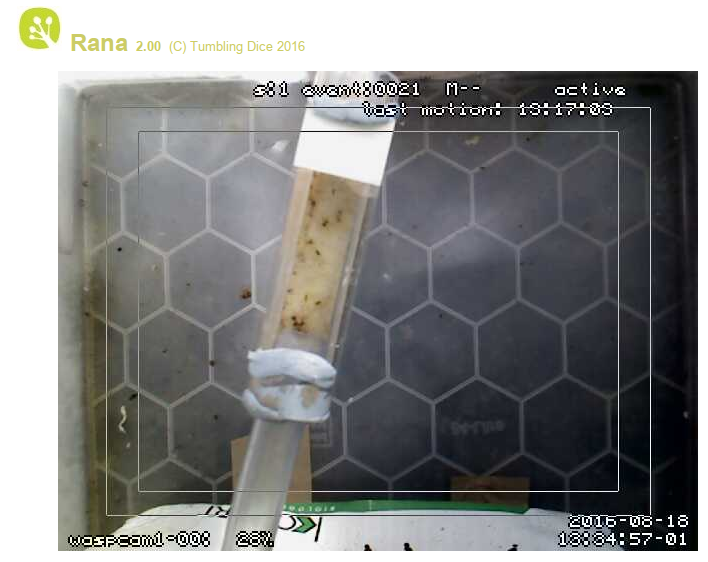
Showing Rana web services streaming video interface
