= Pl@ntNet =

App and website for plant identification

- Available in: Arabic, Chinese, Czech, Dutch, English, Finnish, French, German, Greek, Hebrew, Indonesian, Italian, Polish, Portuguese, Russian, Slovak, Spanish, Turkish, Ukrainian
- Website: plantnet.org/en/
- Commercial: No
- Registration: not required
- Users: 10 million total downloads (as of 2019)
- Launched: 2009; 17 years ago (2013 as an app)
- Current status: Active
- Content license: Proprietary (identification model weights aren't publicly available)

Pl@ntNet is a citizen science project for automatic plant identification through photographs and based on machine learning. Users take a photograph, and the system can identify it as one of more than 77,000 plant species. Pl@ntNet has processed more than a billion photographs from users.

== History ==
This project launched in 2009 has been developed by scientists (computer engineers and botanists) from a consortium gathering French research institutes (Institut de recherche pour le développement (IRD), Centre de coopération internationale en recherche agronomique pour le développement (CIRAD), Institut national de la recherche agronomique (INRA), Institut national de recherche en informatique et en automatique (INRIA) and the network Tela Botanica, with the support of Agropolis Fondation).

Starting in 2022, the Pl@ntNet system received many improvements as a result of research projects "MAMBO" and "GUARDEN" funded by Horizon Europe. Improvements included a standardised taxonomic list of species (using POWO), and an improved computer vision algorithm (using a vision transformer).

== Platforms ==
An app for smartphones (and a web version) was launched in 2013, which allows to identify thousands of plant species from photographs taken by the user. It is available in several languages.

As of 2019 it had been downloaded over 10 million times, in more than 180 countries worldwide.

== Awards ==
- 2020: the Inria prize of the Académie des sciences.

== Projects ==
In 2019, Pl@ntNet has 22 projects:

- 16 geographical projects:
  - North Africa (3030 species),
  - Tropical Africa (1405 species),
  - Amazonia (1249 species),
  - Tropical Andes (559 species).
  - Caribs (1317 species),
  - Canada (2799 species),
  - United States of America (7856 species),
  - Western Europe (6685 species),
  - Comoro Islands (619 species).
  - Hawaii (607 species),
  - Martinique (1236 species),
  - Mauritius (1155 species),
  - Eastern mediterranean (1118 species),
  - New Caledonia (619 species),
  - French Polynesia (955 species),
  - Réunion (1542 species).
- 3 theme projects:
  - useful plants (2854 species),
  - Useful plants of Tropical Africa (491 species),
  - Useful plants of Asia (792 species),
- 3 microprojects:
  - les écologistes de l'Euzière (246 species),
  - Trees of South Africa (290 species),
  - Provence (2109 species).
