= North Carolina State University Insect Museum =

NCSU Insect Museum
- Drawer of insects from the NCSU Insect Museum.
- Established: 1952
- Location: North Carolina State University, Raleigh, North Carolina
- Coordinates: 35.787638°N 78.67262°W
- Type: Natural History Museum
- Collection size: 1.5 million specimens
- Website: insectmuseum.org

The North Carolina State University Insect Museum is the center for research and training in insect systematics and biodiversity informatics at North Carolina State University. The Museum's collections hold more than 1.5 million specimens, with major emphases on the insects of North Carolina and on the Auchenorrhyncha and Aphididae (Hemiptera) of the world. A smaller but historically important part of the collection (especially for bees of the eastern USA) is dedicated to Hymenoptera.

== History ==
Deitz (1983a and 1983b) provides the most comprehensive reviews of the history of the NCSU Insect Museum. Insect reference collections started growing soon after the foundation of NC State University in 1889, with each individual collection being cared for by one curator. These multiple independent collections across campus were then collated into a single resource in 1952, then referred to as the Entomology Museum. This effort was organized by Zeno P. Metcalf, an Auchenorrhyncha systematist who served as the Insect Museum's first director.

This museum has since been referred to as the NCSU Insect Museum, and it continues to serve as a resource for entomologists who need to identify specimens, for researchers attempting to understand more about species distributions through time, for students learning insect taxonomy, and as a repository for vouchers that reference entomological research.

== External resources ==
- North Carolina State University
- North Carolina State University Entomology Department and graduate program
- NCSU Insect Museum website
- Guide to the North Carolina State University, Department of Entomology Drawings and Papers 1926-2000
- NCSU LSID - urn:lsid:biocol.org:col:1024
- Guide to the North Carolina State University, Department of Entomology Film Collection 1980
- Zoomable image of pinned insects from the NCSU Insect Museum
