= Kindwise =

FlowerChecker
- Industry: Machine learning
- Founded: 2014; 12 years ago
- Founder: Ondřej Veselý; Jiří Řihák; Ondřej Vild
- Headquarters: Brno, Czech Republic
- Products: plant.id, insect.id, mushroom.id, plant.health, crop.health
- Website: www.kindwise.com

FlowerChecker, also known as Kindwise, is a company that uses machine learning to identify natural objects from images. This includes plants and their diseases, but also insects and mushrooms. It is based in Brno, Czech Republic. It was founded in 2014 by Ondřej Veselý, Jiří Řihák, and Ondřej Vild, at the time Ph.D. students.

== Features & Tools ==
FlowerChecker offers multiple products.

Plant.id is a machine learning-based plant identification API launched in 2018, with the plant disease identification API, plant.health, released in April 2022. The plant.id API is suitable for integration into other software, such as mobile apps or urban trees from remote-sensing imagery.

Other products include insect.id, mushroom.id and crop.health are machine learning-based identification APIs for the identification of insects, fungi and economically important plants, respectively, and include also online public demos.

The FlowerChecker app was discontinued in October 2024 after 10 years of successful operation.

In 2025, the company, together with the Department of Forest Ecology at the Research Institute for Landscape (VÚK), began developing Forestum.ai, a tool for automated forest inventory and growth prediction. The two-year project (2025–2027) is funded by the European Union through the Czech Ministry of Industry and Trade under the OP TAK programme. Using remote sensing methods, the system combines UAV photogrammetry, terrestrial and aerial LiDAR scanning, and machine learning to evaluate forest conditions down to the level of individual trees, aiming to replace time-consuming manual field surveys. It is designed as a set of seven modules covering tasks such as automatic timber-volume estimation, individual tree detection, tree recognition to genus level, and crown analysis; one module is also intended to estimate timber volume from ordinary RGB drone imagery without LiDAR, making the technology more accessible to smaller forest owners. A prediction module simulates the annual development of forest stands up to the year 2100 under various climate scenarios.

== Recognition ==
In 2019, FlowerChecker won the Idea of the Year award in the AI Awards organized by the Confederation of Industry of the Czech Republic. In 2020, an academic study comparing ten free automated image recognition apps showed that plant.id's performance excelled in most of the parameters studied. In an independent study comparing different image-based species recognition models and their suitability for recognizing invasive alien species, the plant.id achieved the highest accuracy compared to other tools. In a subsequent study, plant.id was utilized to evaluate urban forest biodiversity using remote-sensing imagery, achieving the highest accuracy in tree species identification among compared methods. The technology has also been referenced as an example of practical integration of AI-based plant identification into cross-platform precision agriculture systems.

== Research activities ==
In 2022, the company entered a consortium to develop a weeder capable of in-row weed detection and removal. The project (code FW06010647, 2023–2026), led by the machinery company SMS CZ, s.r.o., develops a robotic hoeing device that uses camera systems and neural-network image analysis to recognise crops in real time and mechanically remove weeds, reducing herbicide use; its total eligible costs are CZK 23.55 million, of which CZK 16.09 million is provided by the Technology Agency of the Czech Republic under the TREND programme.

In 2025, Kindwise was reported as the main grant recipient in a Technology Agency of the Czech Republic-supported project focused on the detection and removal of invasive plant species. The project, initiated by the conservation organization Česká krajina, uses drones to capture high-resolution imagery of protected sites and trains neural-network models to recognize invasive plants such as lupine, goldenrod and boxelder maple. The system is intended to send detected locations to a ground robot, developed by researchers at the Czech University of Life Sciences Prague, for mechanical removal of the plants while also recognizing protected species to avoid damaging them.
