= Tela Botanica =

French botanical community

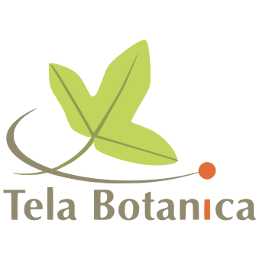
- Type: Non-governmental organization
- Purpose: Botany
- Headquarters: Montpellier
- Location: Hérault
- Leader: Daniel Mathieu
- Website: www.tela-botanica.org
- Remarks: See article for more details on formation.

Tela Botanica is a collaborative network of francophone botanists (about 47 000 enrolled in 110 countries at the beginning of 2020). It served as a model for the network of entomologists Tela Insecta, which is developing in partnership with Tela Botanica.

== Context ==
The Tela Botanica network was created with the aim of supporting the renewal of botany in the French-speaking world, in the context of the protection of the planet's resources and the need for their sustainable exploitation.

== History ==
The Tela Botanica network was created in December 1999 and is managed by a French association: Association Tela Botanica. Its founding members include three legal entities (the Société botanique de France, the botanical review La Garance voyageuse and the association ACEMAV) and the initiator of the project is Daniel Mathieu.

The headquarters of the association is located at the Institute of Botany of Montpellier (Montpellier 2 University). In four years, the network doubled its number of registrants, whereas it took seven years to reach the ten thousandth registrant. The 20,000th member joined the association on April 22, 2013. By 2014, the network has approximately 24,000 registered members and approximately 13,000 pages of the site are accessed daily.

== Aims ==
Its main objectives are:

- to create links between francophone botanists;
- to set up collective projects;
- to collect data to make available to botanists;
- to bring together the initiatives that contribute to the development of botany, including "digital botany".

== Operation ==
The Tela Botanica network is aimed at all persons, whether natural or legal, interested in the knowledge and protection of the plant world, in an ethic of respect for nature, man and his environment.
Its operation is based on two essential choices:

- the logic and ethics of the collaborative networks for the mode of participation of the members (cf the work of Jean-Michel Cornu);
- the massive use of ICT (information and communication technologies) as a means of exchanging among members through its internet portal of French-speaking botany.

All software and applications developed under the network are licensed under CeCILL. The data and documents are mainly distributed under a free Creative Commons license. A close collaboration is established with the French-speaking botanical portal of Wikipedia.

Registration for the Tela Botanica network is free of charge. It gives the possibility to use the logistical and technical means of the Network to set up and develop projects, to participate in the different groups animated within the network and to receive by e-mail the weekly newsletter of botanical news. Registration is done online from the Internet and a global mapping system can view the location of the 15,000 registered (as of June 8, 2011) of the network in more than 60 countries.

The network is run by a nonprofit organization. As of 2020, the organization had 10 employees and a budget of €695,855, 68% of which came from government grants. An important but unquantified part comes from the volunteering of the members, who have opportunities for expression, collaborative work and proposal in the forums and other advisory tools and databases and photos put in place by the network (eFlore, Online Notebook, newsletter ...). They can be consulted by the steering committee to obtain an opinion on important choices. They are a key element in the dynamics and life of the network.
