= Epithet (disambiguation) =

An epithet is a name. In taxonomic nomenclature, it is a word or phrase (epithet) in the name of an organism. It can be:

- a specific epithet:
  - the second part of a species name in binomial nomenclature in any branch of biology
    - in botany, the second part of a botanical name
    - Specific epithet (zoology), also called the specific name, meaning the second part of the species name or binomen
- a genus, epithet
- a subgenus, epithet
- in botanical nomenclature:
  - a Section (botany), epithet
  - a Series (botany), epithet
  - a variety (botany), epithet
  - a forma (botany), epithet
- in horticulture:
  - a cultivar, epithet
  - a cultivar group epithet, for plants within a species that share characteristics
  - a grex (horticulture) epithet for cultivated orchids, according to their parentage
