= Organic computing =

Organic computing is computing that behaves and interacts with humans in an organic manner. The term "organic" is used to describe the system's behavior, and does not imply that they are constructed from organic materials. It is based on the insight that we will soon be surrounded by large collections of autonomous systems, which are equipped with sensors and actuators, aware of their environment, communicate freely, and organize themselves in order to perform the actions and services that seem to be required.

The goal is to construct such systems as robust, safe, flexible, and trustworthy as possible. In particular, a strong orientation towards human needs as opposed to a pure implementation of the technologically possible seems absolutely central. In order to achieve these goals, our technical systems will have to act more independently, flexibly, and autonomously, i.e. they will have to exhibit lifelike properties. We call such systems "organic". Hence, an "Organic Computing System" is a technical system which adapts dynamically to exogenous and endogenous change. It is characterized by the properties of self-organization, self-configuration, self-optimization, self-healing, self-protection, self-explaining, and context awareness. It can be seen as an extension of the Autonomic computing vision of IBM.

In a variety of research projects the priority research program SPP 1183 of the German Research Foundation (DFG) addresses fundamental challenges in the design of Organic Computing systems; its objective is a deeper understanding of emergent global behavior in self-organizing systems and the design of specific concepts and tools to support the construction of Organic Computing systems for technical applications.

== See also ==
- Biologically inspired computing
- Autonomic computing
