= Organic =

Organic may refer to:

- Organic, of or relating to an organism, a living entity
- Organic, of or relating to an anatomical organ

== Chemistry ==
- Organic matter, matter that has come from a once-living organism, is capable of decay or is the product of decay, or is composed of organic compounds
- Organic compound, a compound that contains carbon
  - Organic chemistry, chemistry involving organic compounds

== Farming, certification and products ==
- Organic farming, agriculture conducted according to certain standards, especially the use of stated methods of fertilization and pest control
- Organic certification, accreditation process for producers of organically-farmed products
- Organic horticulture, the science and art of growing fruits, vegetables, flowers, or ornamental plants by following the essential principles of organic agriculture
- Organic products, "organics":
  - Organic food, food produced from organic farming methods and often certified organic according to organic farming standards
  - Organic clothing, clothing produced from organic fibers such as organic cotton
  - Organic wine
- Organic movement, movement of organizations and individuals promoting organic farming and organic food

== Computing ==
- Wetware computer or organic computer, a computer built from living neurons and ganglions
- Organic computing, computing systems with properties of self-configuration, self-optimization, self-healing, and/or self-protection
- Organic search, search results through unpaid search engine listings, rather than through paid advertisements
- Organic search engine, search engine which uses a combination of human operators and computer algorithms
- Organic semiconductor, an organic compound that exhibits similar properties to inorganic semiconductors

== Economics and business ==
- Organic growth, business expansion through increasing output and sales as opposed to mergers, acquisitions and takeovers
- Organic, Inc., original digital marketing & advertising agency
- Organic organisation, one which is flexible and has a flat structure
- Organic Records, formerly a sub-label of Pamplin Music, now owned by Crossroads Entertainment & Marketing

== Law ==
- Organic law, a fundamental law
- Organic statute, literally "regulations for an organ", with "organ" meaning an organization or governmental body
- Organic Articles, a French law presented in 1802

== Music ==
- Organic (Arj Barker album), 2019
- Organic (Freak Kitchen album), 2005
- Organic (Joe Cocker album), 1996
- Organic-Lee, a 2006 album by Lee Konitz and Gary Versace
- Organic Music Festival, an electronic music festival in the United States

== Other uses ==
- Organic (military), a military unit that is a permanent part of a larger unit and (usually) provides some specialized capability to that parent unit
- Organic (model), forms, methods and patterns found in living systems, often used as a metaphor for non-living things
- Organic disease, involving or affecting physiology or bodily organs
- Organic process
- Organic Realism, or process philosophy
- Organic architecture

== See also ==
- Organic salt (disambiguation)
- Organicism, the biological doctrine which stresses the organization, rather than the composition, of organisms
- Organix (disambiguation)
