= Implementability =

Implementability may refer to:

- Implementability (mechanism design)
- Implementability (medicine)

== See also ==
- Implementation
