= Organic structure =

Organic structure may refer to:

- Organic (model), forms, methods and patterns found in living systems, often used as a metaphor for non-living things
- The molecular structure of an organic compound, also known as the structural formula of an organic compound

== See also ==
- Organic (disambiguation)
