= Parallel running =

Strategy for system changeover

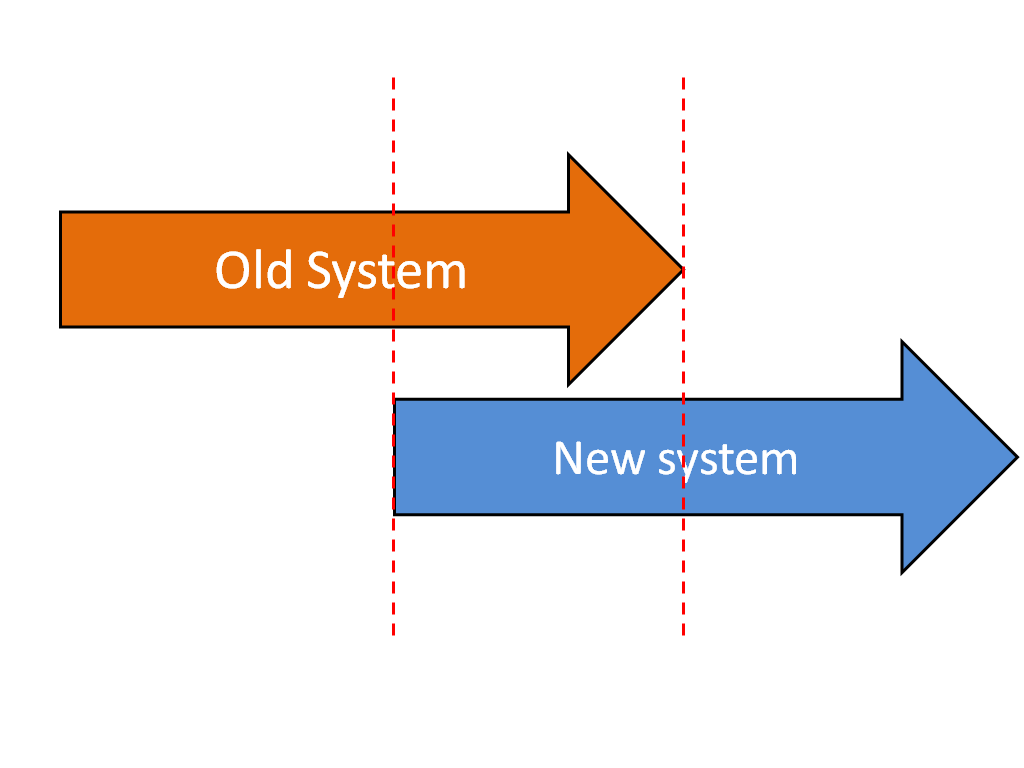
The old and new systems are doing the same processing and operating side by side

Parallel running is a strategy for system changeover where a new system slowly assumes the roles of the older system while both systems operate simultaneously. This conversion takes place as the technology of the old system is outdated so a new system is needed to be installed to replace the old one. After a period of time, when the system is proved to be working correctly, the old system will be removed completely and users will depend solely on the new system. The phrase parallel running can refer to the process of changing a fragment of business information technology operation to a new system or to the technique applied by the human resources departments in which the existing staff stay on board during the transition to a new staff.

== Overview ==
The new system needs to be implemented once it has been built and tested so that it is carrying out the jobs well according to the objectives. This involves a few initial steps which are:

- ensuring the correct hardware and software have been prepared; any additional hardware and software are prepared and stored until they are implemented. Before setting up the hardware and so

== The process ==
During changeover, a new system and an existing system run side by side for an agreed period of time. This should be long enough to ensure that all aspects of the new system has been confirmed that it can work properly. Both input the same data and perform the same processes. This will compare their output and prove the reliability of the new system. If the new system is accepted, the existing system will stop running and will be replaced by the new one. If both old and new systems are computerized, the input data can be held on a disk or tape and run concurrently on both systems. If changing from a manual system to computerized system, the main problem is inputting the data. Data needs to be input manually and this may take a long time.

== Advantages ==
Parallel running allows results to be compared to ensure that the new system is working without any errors. If errors are found, user can refer to the old system to resolve the problem and make modifications to the new system thus operation can continue under the old system while the problems are sorted out. This also allows training of staff and help them to gain confidence in the new system.

== Disadvantages ==
The cost of implementation is very expensive because of the need to operate the two systems at the same time. It is a great expense in terms of electricity and operation costs. This would be prohibitive with a large and complex system. Parallel running implementation also requires a lot of time and needs frequent maintenance. This will slow production in a firm as workers need to do twice their normal workload for a period of time in order to achieve the same goal for both systems. This involves inputting or changing the same data for both systems to ensure the information are identical in both systems.

== Examples of parallel running implementation ==
The practical example of parallel running in human resource management is job placement. New staff and old staff work for the same job. If the new staff's performance is OK, the existing staff may not be needed any more, and will be replaced. Another example is when a new firm which undergoes change in ownership and wants to recruit new staff to operate the firm. Making the change all at once can cause problems if the new staff do not know the basics of the operation. For this reason the firm will keep the existing staff on board for a specified time to do their normal jobs while the new staff shadows them and gets the hands-on experience they require. Once the results of the new staff match the results of the existing staff in terms of productivity and operational jobs, the existing staff can be let go. Many business firms use the strategy of parallel running as a way to ensure that the computer software are capable of doing the tasks it is designed for. The old software and the new software receive the same input from the business firm. The outputs from both software programs are compared after a period of time to make sure the transition to the new system completely are fault free. Another example is a publishing firm which is producing textbooks. They decide to run the accounts part of the business by investing in a new computerized system. The existing account system is outdated and is not suitable for use with new hardware. The new system is implemented using parallel running strategy so all accounts and invoices have to be handled both in the new and old systems. If the new system does not function correctly, data from the old system can be used. However, everything needs to be done twice, which will slow down the accounts department and cost money in hiring more staff. This system is safe and the new system can be precisely tested as every transaction can be compared with the result from the old system. It is also applied when using a new computerized system to create brief reference records and generate orders but maintaining the old manual system for final financial control until the new system has been confirmed that it can function correctly.

== Post-implementation review ==
After implementing the new system, comes the post-implementation review phase which normally takes place three to six months. The review is conducted to:

- determine whether the objectives of the new system have been met; if the new system is running differently from the proposed objectives, the problems need to be determined and further modifications to the new system should be carried out. This is to make sure that the new system is capable of doing the tasks it is designed for.
- ensure that the users are using the system correctly; the reports should fulfil their purposes.
- make sure the system is maintainable and flexible; further improvement and additional features to the new system can be done
- determine the flaws in the development process so that future systems can be improved; avoid the same mistakes from happening again

== Other methods of implementation ==
Other than Parallel Running, there are direct changeover, phased implementation and pilot running. Direct changeover is when the old system is completely removed and immediately replaced by the new system. This option is risky as there may still be problems with the new system. It is the cheapest and simplest form of changeover but if something goes wrong, the user cannot fall back on the old system. The staff must be fully trained in advance and all the files must be input to the new system before it goes live. In phased implementation, the system is introduced gradually. Parts of the old system are replaced while the remaining parts are still running in the old system. As an example, a school was introducing Management Information System for all aspects of the school's operation. It could introduce the enrolment system, then four months later the examinations system and in a further four months the timetabling system. As each new module is activated and confirmed to be functioning correctly, the next module can be installed. It is likely that some modules will work with each other. For example, the timetable module assume we have all the students data and so the order in which they are introduced must be considered. Pilot running is when the new system is installed for only a small number of users to test and evaluate the new system. The new system is implemented for all the users once it is considered that it has been fully tested and able to function correctly. The test users can assist in training others on how to use the new system. This implementation strategy is very useful for a system with a large number of users because it can ensure that all the users can use the system effectively.

== Human-computer considerations ==
Implementation of a computerized system from a manual system can cause restructuring within an organisation. People's position and status may change. These changes can alter people's awareness of employment, security, authority and interaction with other staff. People refuse to change to a new computer system may be related to the inability of the system to do specific job requirements, security aspects, possible loss of data, concern about making mistakes when using the system and effects on health. Likewise, computerized system can affect managers in terms of their management role and decision-making process. Systems which are user friendly often meet less refusal as users feel comfortable with the system, have sense of control and be able to evaluate their stored input data. The system itself should also be sufficiently adaptable to suit different backgrounds and proficiency levels of users. Overcoming refusal to change and the adoption of the new system is a management issue. This may be influenced by the attitudes towards the system and knowledge of human-computer interaction. Thus communication skills are required to convince people of the benefits of the new system. People should be given opportunity to learn and evaluate the system. Once they have seen and experienced the benefits of the new system, they will be more ready to accept and run the system

== Education and training of staff ==
The success of system implementation is affected by the way in which systems are operated. Thus, education and training for using the system can be carried out at various levels, by considering the size and complexity of the system. Staff and personal need to be informed about the overall information structure and how to operate the system. This will give some overall understanding of system in place and how information is handled throughout the organisation. Information system infrastructures of the organisation need to be determined in order to decide what training requirements should be carried out. Firms with complex systems involving operations between regional offices through network and distributed system will need information system managers, system operators and support staff. In order to deal with problems, the staff will need training in the operation of equipment and support services. For small organisation where information systems are handled by departmental computers and software, staff may well have the responsibility of managing computer systems in addition to being users. This may be where organisation systems have been developed by end-users or through the use of application packages. Various training courses are available and this is in relation to the organisation information systems. Software houses and universities are often provide general training courses and much will depend upon organisation requirements and the location of training centres. Supplier for a particular product also provides specific training related to their product or system. Many companies which supply software have training divisions whose main purpose is to support customers and training can usually be conducted at the supplier's premises or organisation can choose for in-house training which takes place in the organisation own facilities. It is essential that the operators and users of the new system undergo training to ensure that they can run the system correctly. The cost involved should therefore be viewed as an investment in the organisation in order to achieve the expected goals.

== See also ==
- Implementation
- Application software
- Management
- Parallel processing
