= Organix =

Organix may refer to:

== Business ==
- Organix Ltd., a UK baby food company founded by Lizzie Vann
- Organix Inc., a US pharmaceutical company, developers of drugs such as Tropoxane

== Entertainment ==
- Organix (album), a 1993 album by The Roots
- "Organix", a song by Optimus Rhyme on the album Optimus Rhyme

== See also ==
- Organic (disambiguation)
