= Implementability (medicine) =

In medicine, implementability is a property of clinical practice guidelines. It refers to a set of characteristics that predict ease of (and obstacles to) guideline adaptations by clinicians. There is a journal Implementation Science, which "aims to publish research relevant to the scientific study of methods to promote the uptake of research findings into routine healthcare in clinical, organisational or policy contexts".

== See also ==
- Implementation
