= Organic salt =

Organic salt may refer to:

- In chemistry, an organic salt is a salt (chemistry) containing an organic ion
- In marketing, organic salt is a term for table salt (sodium chloride, NaCl) that is without additives like iodine or anti-caking agents

== See also ==
- Organic food
