= Organic organisation =

A term created by Tom Burns and G.M. Stalker in the late 1950s, organic organizations (Organic system theory), unlike mechanistic organizations (also coined by Burns and Stalker), are flexible and value external knowledge. The theories of Burns and Stalker impacted the field of organization theory, with their study of management and structure of Scottish electronics firms. In their writing contrasting mechanistic and organismic structures, they outlined the differences between the two types.

Also called organismic organization, this form of organizational structure was widely sought and proposed, but difficult to prove it exists. As opposed to the mechanistic organization, it has the least hierarchy and specialization of functions. For an organization to be organic, the participants or workers should have equal levels, with no job descriptions or classifications, and communication should have a hub-network-like form. Organic organisation thrives on the power of personalities and relationships, lack of rigid procedures and communication, and can react quickly and easily to changes in the environment, thus it is said to be the most adaptive form of organization. Decisions arise from the needs felt by individuals in the group, who propose changes to the group, either by discussion or by changing behavior or operations without discussion. The rest of the individuals in the group adapt to the changes as they need to. The weakness of the model is that it requires co-operation and constant adjustment from all the members.

An organic organization is a fluid and flexible network of multi-talented individuals who perform a variety of tasks, as per the definition of D. A. Morand.

== Organic Organization Leads to Teamwork ==
An organic organization exists dependently, meaning that the organization takes into consideration the needs of their employees, leading to group leadership and teamwork. The advantage of group leadership is that controlling the environment is shared by several people, instead of one person telling everyone what is expected. Organic organizations take into consideration the ideas of the employees, opening the doors to teamwork among employees, instead of competition or a feeling of powerlessness. The use of Organic Organizations is thought to provide incentive to employees to co-operate and perform to the best of their abilities.

Burns and Stalker theorized that companies facing a changing environment may have to use an organic organizational structure in order to quickly adapt to changes. These companies have a de-centralized decision making structure to facilitate quickly adapting to changes in the market place. Companies operating in a stable environment would benefit from maintaining a mechanistic organizational structure, where policies are made that stay the same for a long period of time, decision making is centralized around a few people and tasks remain the same.

Christianity has been influenced by the organic organisation movement, rejecting hierarchy, ritual and even church owned real estate. House churches and simple churches have sprung up often influenced by Neil Cole, Frank Viola and George Barna.

== See also ==
- Outline of organizational theory
