= Tom Burns (sociologist) =

British sociologist (1913–2001)

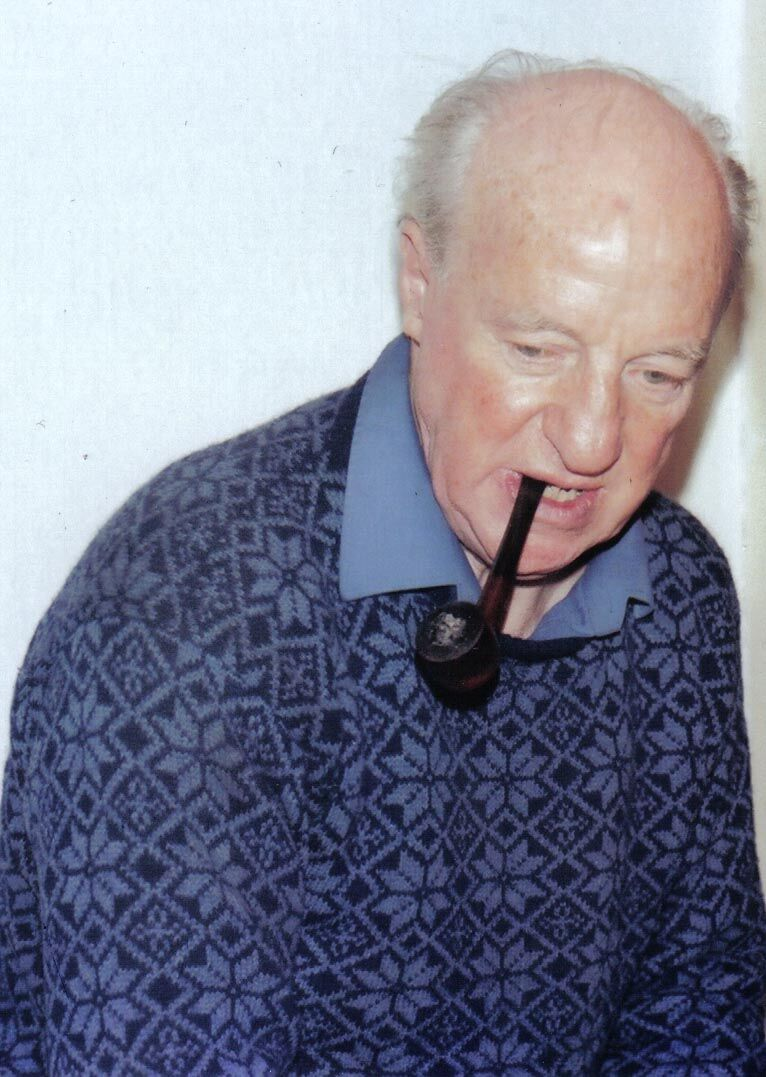
- Burns in the 1990s
- Born: 16 January 1913; London
- Died: 20 June 2001 (aged 88)
- Education: Parmiter's Foundation School Bristol University
- Occupation: Sociologist
- Notable work: The Management of Innovation, 1961; The BBC: public institution and private world, 1977
- Spouse: Elizabeth Burns
- Children: 5 (one son, four daughters)

Tom Burns FBA (16 January 1913 – 20 June 2001) was an English sociologist, author and founder of the Sociology department at Edinburgh University.

== Early life ==
Burns was born on 16 January 1913 in Bethnal Green, East London. He attended Hague Street LCC elementary school and Parmiter's Foundation School before reading English Literature at Bristol University.

== Career ==
A Fellow of the British Academy, Tom Burns was Professor of Sociology at Edinburgh University from 1965 to 1981, and also taught at Harvard and Columbia.

He is best known for his studies of the organization of the BBC, local government, the electronics industry and the National Health Service. He also wrote on his experiences as a non-combatant prisoner of war in Germany during the Second World War.

His early interests were in urban sociology, and he worked with the West Midland Group on Post-War Reconstruction and Planning. While he was at Edinburgh his particular concern was with studies of different types of organization and their effects on communication patterns and on the activities of managers. He has also explored the relevance of different forms of organization to changing conditions—especially to the impact of technical innovation.

In collaboration with psychologist George Macpherson Stalker, Burns has studied the attempt to introduce electronics development work into traditional Scottish firms, with a view to their entering this modern and rapidly expanding industry as the markets for their own well-established products diminished. This resulted in the 1961 book, "The Management of Innovation."

He coined the terms mechanistic organization and organismic, or organic, organization.

He expressed his approach to research and expressed in the preface to the second edition of The Management of Innovation: "by perceiving behaviour as a medium of constant interplay and mutual redefinition of individual identities and social institutions ... it is possible to begin to grasp the nature of changes, developments and historical processes through which we move and which we help to create." In 1964, he founded the Sociology department at University of Edinburgh.

The 1978 book The Development of the Modern State: A Sociological Introduction by Gianfranco Poggi is dedicated to Tom Burns. He retired from the University of Edinburgh in 1981.

== Works ==
First published in 1961, The Management of Innovation remains one of the most influential books of organization theory and industrial sociology. The central theme of the book is the relationship between an organization and its environment—particularly technological and market innovations. The book presents the authors' classifications of "mechanistic" and "organic" systems. For this it became famous, but the book is also a penetrating study of social systems within organizations and organizational dynamics.

In reviews of the book, ESRC News called it "one of the most influential books of organisation theory and industrial sociology ever written"; Christopher Lorenz at The Financial times noted "Written in refreshingly plain English, it is a riveting read and brims with insight after insight."

In 1977, he published The BBC: Public Institution and Private World. John Eldridge in the Independent observed "The original work for this was done in 1963. To his surprise, an experience he described as "utterly mystifying", the BBC refused to allow him to publish. But in 1972 the decision was changed. Burns used the opportunity to bring the study up to date and show how administrative changes were impinging on concepts of work, public service and commitment to the BBC. It is a book full of thoughtful analysis and sharp insights."

The last work he published during his lifetime in 1991 was an intellectual biography of Erving Goffman. Following his retirement from academic life in 1981, he worked on a comparative history of organization entitled Organisation and Social Order until his death in 2001.

=== Books ===
- Local Government and Central Control (for The West Midland Group), Routledge and Kegan Paul, 1956.
- The Management of Innovation (with G. M. Stalker), Tavistock, 1961. New Edition, 1994.
- Industrial Man (ed.), Penguin, 1969.
- Sociology of Literature and Drama (ed., with E. Burns), Penguin, 1973.
- The BBC: Public Institution and Private World, Macmillan, 1977.
- Erving Goffman, Routledge, 1992
- Description, Explanation and Understanding. Selected Writings, 1944 – 1980. Edinburgh University Press, 1995.

=== Research reports ===
- Local Development in Scotland (with A. K. Cairncross), Scottish Council (Development and Industry). 1952
- Management in the Electronics Industry: A Study of Eight English Companies, Social Science Research Centre, University of Edinburgh. 1958
- The Child Care Service at Work (with S. Sinclair), HMSO. 1963
- Rediscovering Organisation: Aspects of Collaboration and Managerialism in Hospital Organisation (mimeo) Nuffield Provincial Hospitals Trust. 1981

=== Journal articles and book chapters ===
- 'Calamity Bay', Penguin New Writing, no. 19, pp. 9–21, 1944
- 'Men and Barbed Wire', The Fortnightly, new series no. 940, pp. 272–7, 1945
- 'Social Development in New Neighbourhoods', Pilot Papers, vol. 2, pp. 21–31, 1947.
- 'Village, Town and Suburb', Cambridge Journal, vol. 4, pp. 96–105, 1950
- 'The Directions of Activity and Communication in a Departmental Executive Group', Human Relations, vol. 8, pp. 73–97, 1954.
- 'Friends, Enemies and the Polite Fiction', American Sociological Review, vol. 18, pp. 654–62, 1955.
- 'The Reference of Conduct in Small Groups: Cliques and Cabals in Occupational Milieux', Human Relations vol. 8, pp. 147–67, 1956.
- 'The Social Character of Technology', Impact, vol. 7, pp. 147–67, 1956.
- 'The Cold Class War', New Statesman and Nation, April, pp. 331–2, 1956.
- 'Management in Action', Operational Research Quarterly, vol. 8, pp. 45–60, 1957.
- 'The Idea of Structure in Sociology', Human Relations, vol. 11, pp. 217–28, 1958.
- 'The Forms of Conduct', American Journal of Sociology, vol. LXIV, pp. 137–228, 1958.
- 'The City as Looking-Glass', Prospect: R1AS Quarterly, no. 122, pp. 9–11, 1960.
- 'R&D and Production: Problems of Conflict and Co-operation', Institute of Radio Engineers: Transactions on Engineering Management, vol. 8, pp. 15–23, 1961.
- 'Social Norms and Social Evolution', in M. Banton (ed.), Darwinism and the Study of Society, Tavistock, 1961.
- 'Micropolitics: Mechanisms of Institutional Change', Administrative Science Quarterly, vol. 6, no. 3, pp. 257–81, 1961.
- 'Des fins et des moyens dans la direction des entre-prises', Sociologie du Travail, vol. 3, pp. 209–29, 1962.
- 'The Sociology of Industry', in A. T. Welford, M. Argyle, D. V. Glass and J. N. Morris (eds), Society: Problems and Methods of Study, Routledge and Kegan Paul, 1962.
- 'Industry in a New Age', New Society, vol. 1, pp. 17–20, 1963.
- 'Non-Verbal Communication', Discovery, vol. 25, pp. 30–7, 1964.
- 'What Managers Do', New Society, vol. 4, no. 116, pp. 8–9, 1964.
- 'Technology' and 'Social Change', in J. Gould and W. L. Kolb (eds), Dictionary of the Social Sciences, Tavistock (for UNESCO), 1965.
- Sociological Explanation, Inaugural Lecture, no. 28, University of Edinburgh, 1966.
- 'On the Plurality of Social Systems' and 'Report of Discussion, and Commentary on Final Session', in J. R. Lawrence (ed.), Operational Research and the Social Sciences (Cambridge International Conference, 1964), Tavistock. 1966.
- 'The Comparative Study of Organizations', in V. Vroom (ed.). The Study of Organizations, University of Pittsburgh Press, pp. 113–70. 1967.
- Introduction to Social Theory and Economic Change, T. Burns and S. B. Saul (eds), Tavistock,. 1967.
- 'Consumer Behaviour: A Sociological View', European Journal of Sociology, vol. 7, pp. 313–29, 1967.
- 'A Meaning in Everyday Life', New Society, pp. 760–2, 1967.
- 'Models, Myths and Images', in W. H. Gruber and D. Marquis (eds), Human Factors in the Transfer of Technology, M.I.T. Press, pp. 11–23, 1968.
- 'The Revolt of the Privileged', Social Science Information, vol. 7, no. 4, pp. 137–49, 1969.
- 'Public Service and Private World', in P. Halmos (ed.), in "The Sociology of Mass Communications', Sociological Review Monograph, no. 13, pp. 53-73, 1969.
- 'Comment on Peter M. Blau's "Objectives of Sociology"', in R. Bierstedt (ed.), A Design for Sociology: Scope, Objectives and Methods, Monograph 9, American Academy of Political and Social Science, pp. 72–9, 1969.
- 'Possible Industrial Futures', Education and Culture, Council for Cultural Cooperation of the Council of Europe, pp. 20–4, 1969.
- 'Television and the Public Good', in J. D. Halloran and M. Gurevitch (eds), Broadcaster/Researcher Cooperation in Mass Communication Research (Report on an International Seminar, 1970), Centre for Mass Communication Research, University of Leicester, 1971.
- 'Commitment and Career in the BBC', in D. McQuail (ed.), The Sociology of Mass Communication, Penguin, 1972.
- 'The Rationale of the Corporate System', in R. Marris (ed.), The Corporate Society, Macmillan, pp. 121–77, 1973.
- 'Leisure, Work and the Social Structure', in M. A. Smith, S. R. Parker and C. S. Smith (eds), Leisure and Society in Britain,. Allen Lane, 1974.
- 'Sovereignty, Interests and Bureaucracy in the Modern State', British Journal of Sociology, vol. 31, no. 4, pp. 491–506, 1980.
- 'The BBC and Government Control', Harvard International Review, vol. 9, pp. 18–20, 1987.

== Death ==
Burns died on 20 June 2001.

In his obituary was published along with his unfinished manuscript said

"Tom Burns was one of those relatively rare people who not only study organisations and institutions but know how to build them. He created a department at the University of Edinburgh which more than 35 years later still to some extent reflects his skill in choosing colleagues with strong talents and skills across the board. He laid the foundation for the department's excellence, which is reflected in its high grades in the Research Assessment Exercises and Teaching Quality Assessments of recent years."

== Legacy ==
His final book was a comparative history of organization entitled Organisation and Social Order but it was never fully completed. The unfinished manuscript has been published online, together with a complete list of published writings. His work on the BBC has been referred to in the 2016 book, The BBC Myth of a Public Service.
