= Organic (model) =

Organic describes forms, methods and patterns found in living systems such as the organisation of cells, to populations, communities, and ecosystems.

Typically organic models stress the interdependence of the component parts, as well as their differentiation. Other properties of organic models include:

- the growth, life or development cycle
- the ability to adapt, learn, and evolve
- emergent behaviour or emergent properties
- steady change or growth, as opposed to instant change
- regulatory feedback
- composed of heterogeneous (diverse) parts

Organic models are used especially in the design of artificial systems, and the description of social systems and constructs.

== Uses ==
In the social sciences, the organic model has been drawn upon for ideas such as mechanical and organic solidarity and organic unity. Carl Ritter advanced the idea of Lebensraum using the metaphor of an organic, growing state.

In computer science, organic networks grow in an ad hoc manner, while organic computing is autonomous and able to self-organise and heal.

Bionics (biomimicry) is the engineering of technology through the use of systems found in biology.

Organic architecture stresses interrelatedness as it combines the site, buildings, furnishings, and surroundings into a unified whole, each adapted to the others. Examples include the use of passive solar and wind energy as elements of design so that the building can be easily adapted to maintain the desired levels of human comfort within the structure.

In economics and business, organic growth refers to market growth that has happened gradually, and not through a sudden buyout or acquisition. An organic organisation is one which is flexible and has a flat structure, or one of minimal height.

In military, organic refers to mixtures of military unit types.

== See also ==
- Genetic algorithm
- Cybernetics
- Organic law
- Ecological Engineering
