= Implementation =

Realization concept

Implementation is the realization of an application, execution of a plan, idea, model, design, specification, standard, algorithm, policy, or the administration or management of a process or objective.

== Industry-specific definitions ==
=== Information technology ===
In the information technology industry, implementation refers to the post-sales process of guiding a client from purchase to use of the software or hardware that was purchased. This includes requirements analysis, scope analysis, customizations, systems integrations, user policies, user training and delivery. These steps are often overseen by a project manager using project management methodologies. Software Implementations involve several professionals that are relatively new to the knowledge based economy such as business analysts, software implementation specialists, solutions architects, and project managers.

To implement a system successfully, many inter-related tasks need to be carried out in an appropriate sequence. Utilising a well-proven implementation methodology and enlisting professional advice can help but often it is the number of tasks, poor planning and inadequate resourcing that causes problems with an implementation project, rather than any of the tasks being particularly difficult. Similarly with the cultural issues it is often the lack of adequate consultation and two-way communication that inhibits achievement of the desired results.

=== Social and health sciences ===
Implementation is defined as a specified set of activities designed to put into practice an activity or program of known dimensions. According to this definition, implementation processes are purposeful and are described in sufficient detail such that independent observers can detect the presence and strength of the "specific set of activities" related to implementation. In addition, the activity or program being implemented is described in sufficient detail so that independent observers can detect its presence and strength.

In computer science, implementation results in software, while in social and health sciences, implementation science studies how the software can be put into practice or routine use.

== Role of end users ==
System implementation generally benefits from high levels of user involvement and management support. User participation in the design and operation of information systems has several positive results. First, if users are heavily involved in systems design, they move opportunities to mold the system according to their priorities and business requirements, and more opportunities to control the outcome. Second, they are more likely to react positively to the change process. Incorporating user knowledge and expertise leads to better solutions.

The relationship between users and information systems specialists has traditionally been a problem area for information systems implementation efforts. Users and information systems specialists tend to have different backgrounds, interests, and priorities. This is referred to as the user-designer communications gap. These differences lead to divergent organizational loyalties, approaches to problem solving, and vocabularies. Examples of these differences or concerns are below:

=== Designer concerns ===
- How much disk storage space will the master file consume?
- How many lines of program code will it take to perform this function?
- How can we cut down on CPU time when we run the system?
- What are the most efficient ways of storing this data?
- What database management system should we use?

== Critique of the premise of implementation ==
Social scientific research on implementation also takes a step away from the project oriented at implementing a plan, and turns the project into an object of study. Lucy Suchman's work has been key, in that respect, showing how the engineering model of plans and their implementation cannot fully account for the situated action and cognition involved in real-world practices of users relating to plans: that work shows that a plan cannot be specific enough for detailing everything that successful implementation requires. Instead, implementation draws upon implicit and tacit resources and characteristics of users and of the plan's components.

== See also ==
- Application software
- Situated cognition
