= Zogaj =

Zogaj may refer to the following settlements and location in Albania and Montenegro:

- Zogaj, Kukës, a village in Kukës County
- Zogaj, Shkodër, a village in Shkodër municipality
- Zogaj, a village in Ulcinj Municipality
- Zogaj mine, a chromium mine in Kukës County
