= Stoj =

Stoj may refer to:

- Stoj., taxonomic author abbreviation for Nikolay Stoyanov (1883–1968), Bulgarian academic and botanist
- Bartłomiej Stój (born 1996), Polish athlete
- Villages in Montenegro:
  - Donji Štoj
  - Gornji Štoj
