= Lake Šas =

Lake in Ulcinj Municipality, Montenegro

Lake Šas Šasko Jezero / Шаско Језеро Liqeni i Shasit
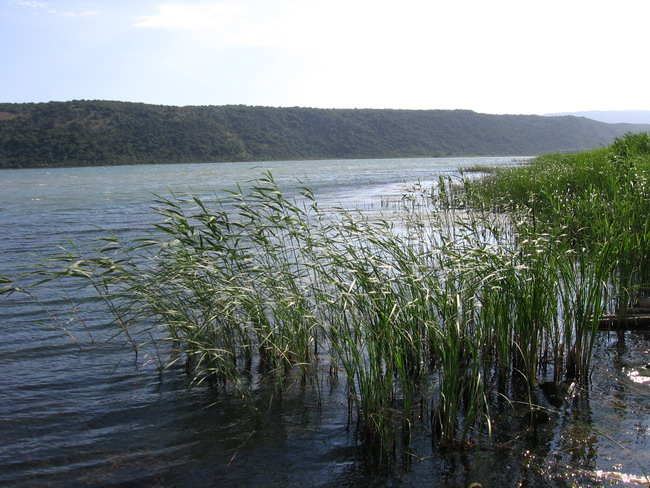

- Location within Montenegro
- Location: Ulcinj Municipality
- Coordinates: 41.973°N 19.334°E
- Primary outflows: Bojana
- Basin countries: Montenegro
- Max. length: 3.2 km (2.0 mi)
- Max. width: 1.5 km (0.93 mi)
- Surface area: 5.5 km^{2} (2.1 sq mi)
- Max. depth: 7.8 m (26 ft)
- Shore length^{1}: 8.6 km (5.3 mi)
- ^{1} Shore length is not a well-defined measure.

Lake Šas (Serbian: Шаско jезеро, romanized: Šasko jezero; Albanian: Liqeni i Shasit) is a lake located north-east of Ulcinj, near the village of Šas, in Montenegro. It is bordered geographically by Briska Gora (Mali i Brisë) to the southwest, Fraskanjelsko Polje (Këneta e Fraskanjellit) to the east, Ambulsko Brdo (Mali i Amullit) and Šasko Brdo (Mali i Shasit) to the northeast and the Brisko Polje (Fusha e Brisë) to the northwest. Geopolitically, Briska Gora lies to the southwest of Lake Šas, Fraskanjel lies to the east and Ambula and Šas to the northeast. The area of this lake is 5.5 km^{2}, it is 3.2 km long and 1.5 km wide. The max depth is 7.8 m. The shore of the lake is about 8.6 km.

It is also known as Little Lake Skadar because it has the same flora and fauna as Lake Skadar, which is much larger in size than Lake Šas. In warmer months, the lake is populated with large numbers of different bird species.

== Fauna ==
List of bird species that have been found in Lake Šas:

- Pelecanus crispus
- Podiceps cristatus
- Tachybaptus ruficollis
- Microcarbo pygmeus
- Egretta garzetta
- Ardeola ralloides
- Platalea leucorodia
- Botaurus stellaris
- Anas platyrhynchos
- Larus cachinnans
- Sterna caspia
- Fulica atra
