= Brajše =

Brajše Брајше Brajshë
- Village
- Location within Montenegro
- Coordinates: 42.023°N 19.315°E
- Country: Montenegro
- Region: Coastal
- Municipality: Ulcinj

Population (2011)
  - Total: 682
- Time zone: UTC+1 (CET)
  - Summer (DST): UTC+2 (CEST)
- Car plates: UL

Brajše (Montenegrin Cyrillic: Брајше; Albanian: Brajshë) is a village in the municipality of Ulcinj, Montenegro. It is located north-east of Ulcinj town.

== Demographics ==
Population of Brajše
Year	Pop.	±%
2003	767	—
2011	682	−11.1%

According to Montenegro's 2011 census, Brajše has a population of 682 of which 344 are men (50.4%) and 338 are women (49.6%). A significant portion of the population (559, or 82.0%) is over the age of 15.

=== Ethnic Demographics ===
According to Montenegro's 2011 census, all residents of Brajše are ethnically Albanian and nearly all residents (99.9%) consider Albanian to be their mother tongue. Additionally, 681 (99.9%) of the residents practice Islam.

Ethnicity	Number	Percentage
Albanians	682	100.00%
Others	0	0%
Total	682	100%
