= Kruče =

Kruče Круче Krruç
- Village
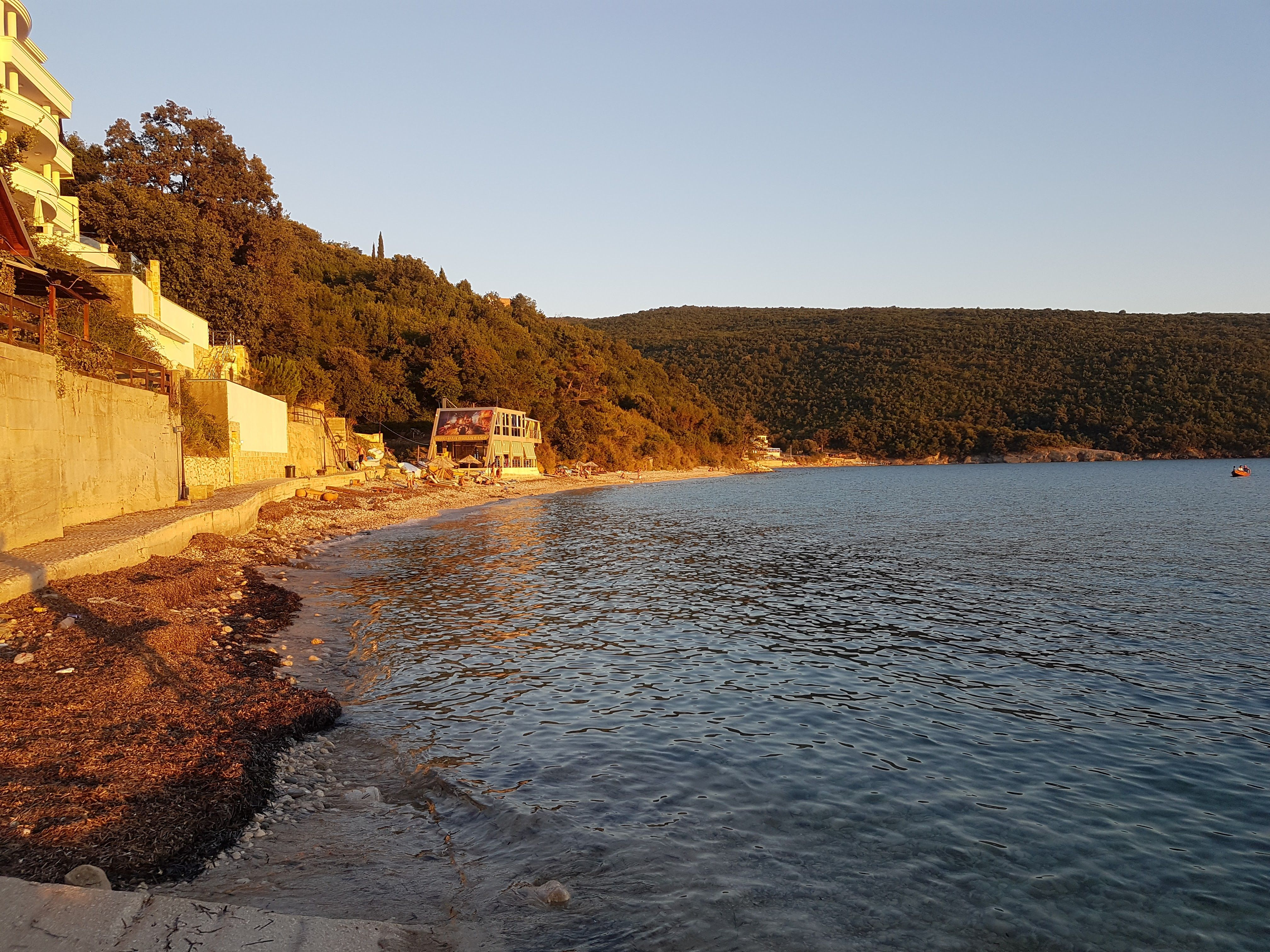
- Beach in Kruče, Montenegro

- Location within Montenegro
- Coordinates: 41.9863°N 19.1541°E
- Country: Montenegro
- Region: Coastal
- Municipality: Ulcinj

Population (2011)
  - Total: 142
- Time zone: UTC+1 (CET)
  - Summer (DST): UTC+2 (CEST)

Kruče (Montenegrin Cyrillic: Круче; Albanian: Krruç) is a village in the municipality of Ulcinj, Montenegro.

== Demographics ==
According to the 2011 census, its population was 142.

Ethnicity in 2011
| Ethnicity | Number | Percentage |
|---|---|---|
| Albanians | 68 | 47.9% |
| Montenegrins | 29 | 20.4% |
| Serbs | 8 | 5.6% |
| other/undeclared | 37 | 26.1% |
| Total | 142 | 100% |
