= Mide (disambiguation) =

Mide was a kingdom in Ireland.

Mide may also refer to:

- Mide, Ulcinj, a village in Montenegro
- Mide Martins, Nigerian actress
