= Štodra =

Štodra Штодра Shtodhër
- Village
- Location within Montenegro
- Coordinates: 41.985741°N 19.368789°E
- Country: Montenegro
- Region: Coastal
- Municipality: Ulcinj

Population (2011)
  - Total: 112
- Time zone: UTC+1 (CET)
  - Summer (DST): UTC+2 (CEST)

Štodra (Montenegrin Cyrillic: Штодра; Albanian: Shtodhër) is a village in the municipality of Ulcinj, Montenegro. It is located at the Bojana, the border river with Albania.

== Demographics ==
According to the 2011 census, the population of the municipality was 112.
