= Sveti Đorđe, Ulcinj =

Sveti Đorđe Свети Ђорђе Shëngjergj
- Village
- Location within Montenegro
- Coordinates: 41.950333°N 19.339833°E
- Country: Montenegro
- Region: Coastal
- Municipality: Ulcinj

Population (2011)
  - Total: 69
- Time zone: UTC+1 (CET)
  - Summer (DST): UTC+2 (CEST)

Sveti Đorđe (Montenegrin Cyrillic: Свети Ђорђе; Albanian: Shëngjergj) is a village in the municipality of Ulcinj, Montenegro. It is located 15km northeast of Ulcinj, on the west bank of the Buna, on which the Montenegro–Albania border lies.

== Name ==
The village is named after Saint George, the highly venerated Christian saint. Both the Serbian and Albanian names of the village are essentially transliterations of Saint George. Local Albanians often refer to the village as "Shnjergj".

== History ==
Sveti Đorđe was first mentioned historically in the 1582 census of the Sanjak of Scutari. The census referred to the village as a part of the Zabojana nahiyah.

== Demographics ==
According to Montenegro's 2011 census, Sveti Đorđe had a population of 69 of which 28 were men (40.5%) and 41 were women (59.4%).

=== Ethnic Demographics ===
According to Montenegro's 2011 census, all 69 residents of Sveti Đorđe were ethnically Albanian and considered Albanian to be their mother tongue. All 69 residents were Catholic.

Ethnicity	Number	Percentage
Albanians	69	100.00%
Other	0	0%
Total	69	100%

Religion	Number	Percentage
Catholics	69	100.00%
Other	0	0%
Total	69	100%
