= Kosići =

Kosići Косићи Kosiq
- Village
- Location within Montenegro
- Coordinates: 42.0258°N 19.2731°E
- Country: Montenegro
- Region: Coastal
- Municipality: Ulcinj

Population (2011)
  - Total: 306
- Time zone: UTC+1 (CET)
  - Summer (DST): UTC+2 (CEST)

Kosići (Montenegrin Cyrillic: Косићи; Albanian: Kosiq) is a village in the municipality of Ulcinj, Montenegro.

== Demographics ==
According to the 2011 census, its population was 306.

Ethnicity in 2011
Ethnicity	Number	Percentage
Albanians	295	96.4%
other/undeclared	11	3.6%
Total	306	100%
