= Krute Ulcinjske =

Krute Ulcinjske Круте Улцињске Krytha e Ulqinit
- Village
- Location within Montenegro
- Coordinates: 41.969367°N 19.184451°E
- Country: Montenegro
- Region: Coastal
- Municipality: Ulcinj

Population (2011)
  - Total: 196
- Time zone: UTC+1 (CET)
  - Summer (DST): UTC+2 (CEST)

Krute Ulcinjske (Montenegrin Cyrillic: Круте Улцињске; Albanian: Krytha e Ulqinit), or just Kruta, is a village in the municipality of Ulcinj, Montenegro.

== Demographics ==
According to the 2011 census, its population was 196.

Ethnicity in 2011
Ethnicity	Number	Percentage
Albanians	89	45.5%
Montenegrins	59	30.1%
other/undeclared	48	24.5%
Total	196	100%
