= Darza =

Darza Дарза Darzë
- Village
- Location within Montenegro
- Country: Montenegro
- Region: Coastal
- Municipality: Ulcinj

Population (2011)
  - Total: 135
- Time zone: UTC+1 (CET)
  - Summer (DST): UTC+2 (CEST)

Darza (Montenegrin Cyrillic: Дарза; Albanian: Darzë) is a village in the municipality of Ulcinj, southeastern Montenegro. It is a multi-ethnic settlement, inhabited by Montenegrins, Serbs and Albanians.

== Demographics ==
According to the 2003 census, the total population was 119.

According to the 2011 census, its population was 135.

=== Demographic history ===
Demographic history
Ethnic group	1948	1953	1961	1971	1981	1991	2003	2011
Montenegrins							44 (36,97%)	57
Serbs							33 (27,73%)	28
Albanians							28 (23,52%)	43
Others/Unknown							14 (11,76)	7
Total	82	66	109	112	148	131 (108)	124 (119)	135

According to mother tongue, the 2011 census recorded 82 Serbian-speakers, 43 Albanian-speakers, and 10 Montenegrin-speakers.

According to religion, the 2011 census recorded 85 Orthodox Christians, 32 Muslims and 16 Catholics.
