= Kodre =

Kodre Кодре Kodër
- Village
- Location within Montenegro
- Country: Montenegro
- Region: Coastal
- Municipality: Ulcinj

Population (2011)
  - Total: 997
- Time zone: UTC+1 (CET)
  - Summer (DST): UTC+2 (CEST)

Kodre (Montenegrin Cyrillic: Кодре; Albanian: Kodër) also known as Kodra (litereally meaning "hill"), is a small village in the Ulcinj Municipality, in southeastern Montenegro.

== Demographics ==
According to the 2011 census, the town had a population of 997 people. The closest city is Ulcinj, about 4 km (2.5 mi) away. The main ethnic group in the village are Albanians with 100% of the population and the main religious group are Roman Catholics.

Historical population
Year	Pop.	±%
2003	883	—
2011	997	+12.9%
