= Bojke =

Bojke Бојке Bojk
- Village
- Location within Montenegro
- Coordinates: 42.038297°N 19.285819°E
- Country: Montenegro
- Region: Coastal
- Municipality: Ulcinj

Population (2011)
  - Total: 161
- Time zone: UTC+1 (CET)
  - Summer (DST): UTC+2 (CEST)

Bojke (Montenegrin Cyrillic: Бојке; Albanian: Bojk) is a village in the municipality of Ulcinj, Montenegro.

== Demographics ==
According to the 2011 census, its population was 161, all but one of them Albanians.
