= Lisna Bore =

Lisna Bore Лисна Боре Lisna Borë
- Village
- Location within Montenegro
- Coordinates: 42.000618°N 19.363083°E
- Country: Montenegro
- Region: Coastal
- Municipality: Ulcinj

Population (2011)
  - Total: 171
- Time zone: UTC+1 (CET)
  - Summer (DST): UTC+2 (CEST)

Lisna Bore (Montenegrin Cyrillic: Лисна Боре; Albanian: Lisna Borë) is a village in the municipality of Ulcinj, Montenegro. It is located close to the Albanian border.

== Demographics ==
According to the 2011 census, its population was 171, all of them Albanians.
