= Gornja Klezna =

Gornja Klezna Горња Клезна Këllezna e Naltë
- Village
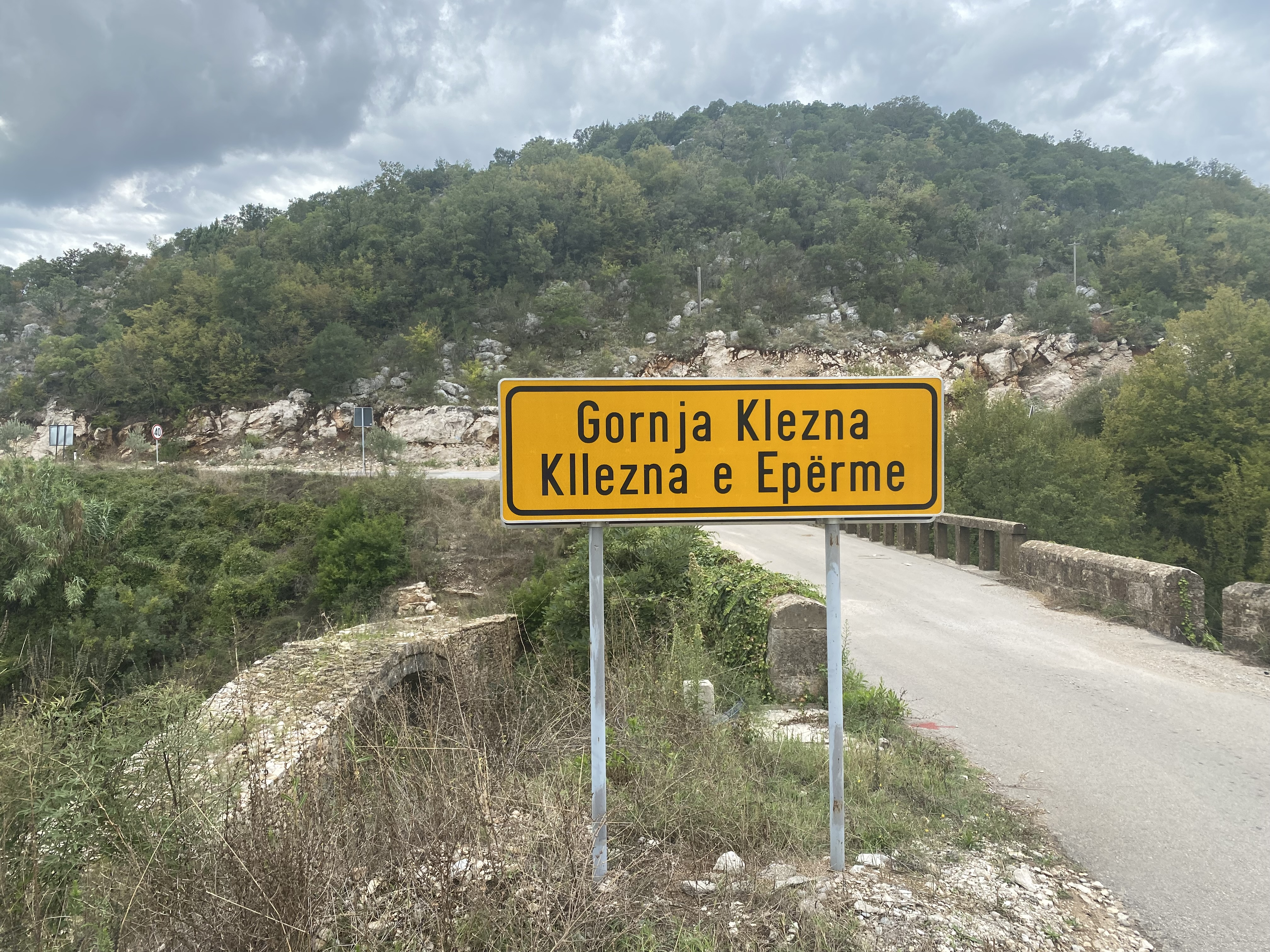

- Location within Montenegro
- Coordinates: 41.997622°N 19.261728°E
- Country: Montenegro
- Region: Coastal
- Municipality: Ulcinj

Population (2011)
  - Total: 165
- Time zone: UTC+1 (CET)
  - Summer (DST): UTC+2 (CEST)

Gornja Klezna (Montenegrin Cyrillic: Горња Клезна; Albanian: Këllezna e Naltë) is a village in the municipality of Ulcinj, Montenegro.

== Demographics ==
According to the 2011 census, its population was 165, all but three of them Albanians.
