= Rastiš =

Rastiš Растиш Rashtishë
- Village
- Location within Montenegro
- Coordinates: 42.047744°N 19.329091°E
- Country: Montenegro
- Region: Coastal
- Municipality: Ulcinj

Population (2011)
  - Total: 358
- Time zone: UTC+1 (CET)
  - Summer (DST): UTC+2 (CEST)

Rastiš (Montenegrin Cyrillic: Растиш; Albanian: Rashtishë) is a village in the municipality of Ulcinj, Montenegro.

== Demographics ==
According to the 2011 census, its population was 358, all of them Albanians.
