= Reč =

Reč Реч Reç
- Village
- Location within Montenegro
- Coordinates: 41°54′34″N 19°23′8″E
- Country: Montenegro
- Region: Coastal
- Municipality: Ulcinj

Population (2011)
  - Total: 61
- Time zone: UTC+1 (CET)
  - Summer (DST): UTC+2 (CEST)

Reč (Montenegrin Cyrillic: Реч; Albanian: Reç) is a small town in the municipality of Ulcinj, southeastern Montenegro. Reč is mentioned in 1413 in the Scutarias taxable income part of the Albanian (arbanas) katun (semi-nomadic pastoral community) of Gjon Kereçi (Kereçi in the original) In recent times, many locals have migrated, notably to the United States. The area is a prime site for agricultural land, hunting, and fishing.

Reč is divided into two sections:

- Reč
- Kodre Dakaj (Albanian: Kodrat e Reçit)

== Family names ==
Djonovic, Dukagjini, Dushaj, Gazivoda, Gjoni / Gjonaj, Kina / Kinic, Mirdita, Selca / Selcanin, Shabani, Zadrima, Zagreda, Lotaj.

Notable people from Reč include

- Mark Gjonaj, Albanian-American politician.

== Demographics ==
The population of Reč between 1948 and 2003 was as follows:

- 1948 – 221
- 1953 – 275
- 1961 – 317
- 1981 – 336
- 1991 – 291
- 2003 – 117

According to the 2011 census, its population was 61.

Ethnicity	Number	Percentage
Albanians	60	98.4%
Others	1	1,6%
Total	61	100%

== See also ==
- http://www.buzuku.info/Arkivi/Buzuku%2020/Informat.htm Familja e Noc Matisë Gjergj Simonit-(Gjonaj)
- http://www.visit-ulcinj.com/blog/2012/09/28/gjonajt-e-reciterdhen-emigrante-e-u-bene-milionere-ne-amerike/ Gjonajt e Reçit
- http://www.visit-ulcinj.com/blog/2013/09/25/cifti-ejll-dhe-age-zagreda-kremtoi-70-vjetorin-e-marteses/ Çifti Ejll dhe Age Zagreda
- http://www.buzuku.info/Arkivi/Buzuku09/M%C3%ABrgimi_2.htm Na morën tokën e na dhanë pasaportën
- https://www.academia.edu/33718705/AKADEMIA_E_SHKENCAVE_E_REPUBUKES_TE_SHQIPERISE Scutarias taxable income
