= Donja Klezna =

Donja Klezna Доња Клезна Këlleznë e Poshtme
- Village
- Location within Montenegro
- Country: Montenegro
- Region: Coastal
- Municipality: Ulcinj
- Elevation: 21 m (69 ft)

Population (2011)
  - Total: 126
- Time zone: UTC+1 (CET)

Donja Klezna (Montenegrin Cyrillic: Доња Клезна; Albanian: Këlleznë e Poshtme) is a village in the municipality of Ulcinj, Montenegro.

== Demographics ==
According to the 2011 census, its population was 126.

Ethnicity in 2011
Ethnicity	Number	Percentage
Albanians	115	91.3%
other/undeclared	11	8.7%
Total	126	100%
