= Kravari, Ulcinj =

Kravari Кравари Kravari
- Village
- Location within Montenegro
- Coordinates: 42.053537°N 19.348327°E
- Country: Montenegro
- Region: Coastal
- Municipality: Ulcinj

Population (2011)
  - Total: 547
- Time zone: UTC+1 (CET)
  - Summer (DST): UTC+2 (CEST)

Kravari (Montenegrin Cyrillic: Кравари; Albanian: Kravari) is a village in the municipality of Ulcinj, Montenegro.

== Demographics ==
According to the 2011 census, its population was 547, all of them Albanians.
