= Pistula =

Pistula Пистула Pistull
- Village
- Location within Montenegro
- Coordinates: 41.941964°N 19.267505°E
- Country: Montenegro
- Region: Coastal
- Municipality: Ulcinj

Population (2011)
  - Total: 384
- Time zone: UTC+1 (CET)
  - Summer (DST): UTC+2 (CEST)

Pistula (Montenegrin Cyrillic: Пистула; Albanian: Pistull) is a village in the municipality of Ulcinj, Montenegro.

== Demographics ==
According to the 2011 census, its population was 384.

Ethnicity in 2011
Ethnicity	Number	Percentage
Albanians	295	76.8%
Montenegrins	33	8.6%
other/undeclared	56	14.6%
Total	384	100%
