= Catholic Church in Montenegro =

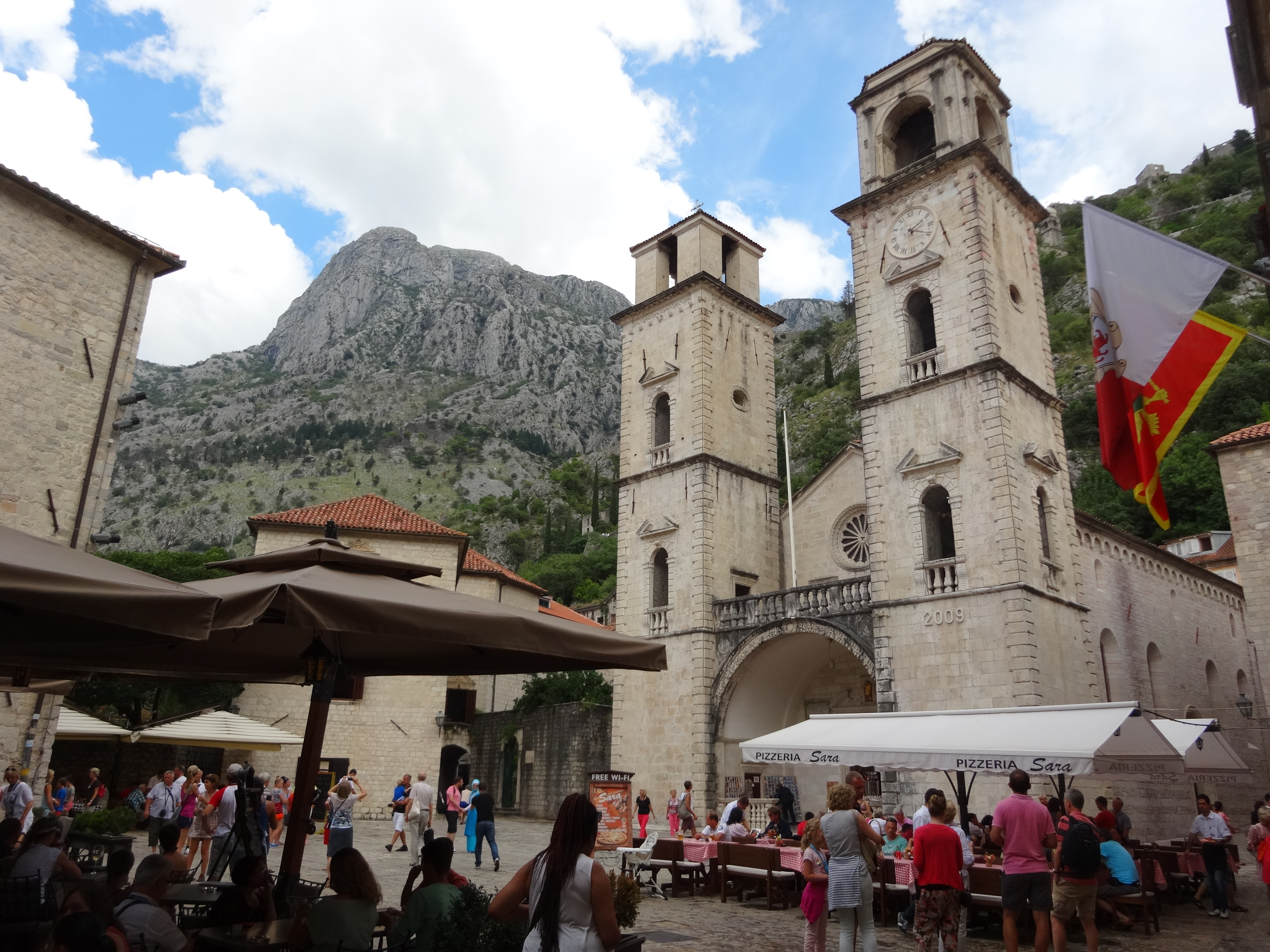
St. Tryphon's Cathedral in Kotor

Map of Montenegro Diocese of Kotor Archdiocese of Bar

The Catholic Church in Montenegro (Montenegrin: Католичка црква у Црној Гори, romanized: Katolička crkva u Crnoj Gori; Albanian: Kisha katolike në Mal të Zi; Croatian: Katolička Crkva u Crnoj Gori) is part of the worldwide Catholic Church, under the spiritual leadership of the Pope in Rome.

There were 20,000 Catholics in Montenegro in 2020, and they formed 2.8% of the population. Most Catholics are ethnic Albanians, Montenegrins, and Croats.

The Apostolic Nuncio to Montenegro and to Bosnia and Herzegovina is Archbishop Francis Chullikatt.

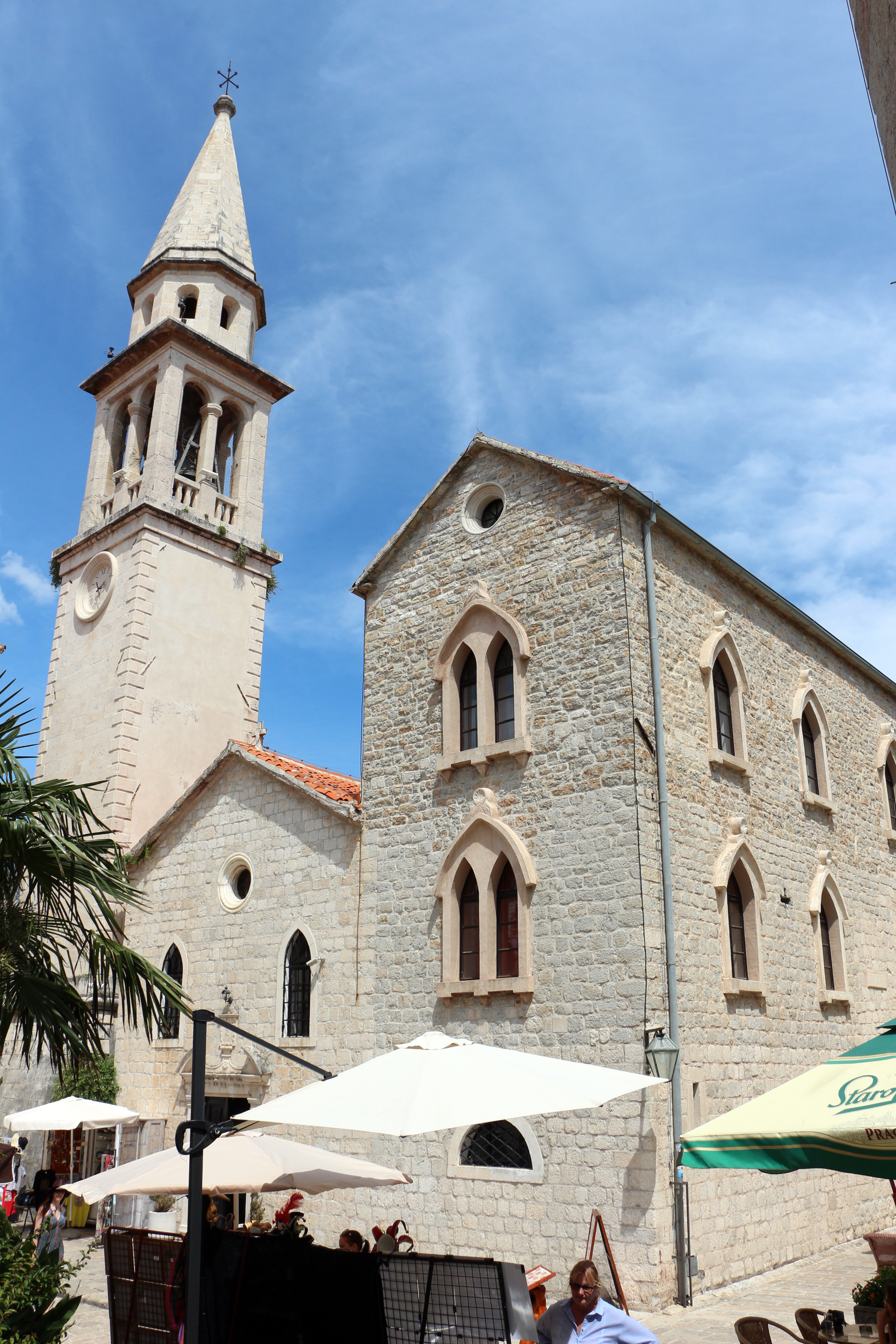
Church of St. Ivan in Budva.

== Organisation ==
=== Latin Church Catholics ===
Within Montenegro the Latin Church Catholic hierarchy consists of the Archdiocese of Bar. The Diocese of Kotor is geographically located in Montenegro, but it is administratively part of the church in Croatia and is subject to the Archdiocese of Split-Makarska of that country. The territory of the Diocese of Kotor (Venetian: Cattaro) corresponds to the territory of Albania Veneta of the Republic of Venice, lost to Napoleon I in 1797 (Albania Veneta was mostly Catholic).

Caritas Montenegro is the social arm of the Catholic Church in the country.

=== Eastern Catholics ===
There are very few Greek Catholics of Montenegro, and no diocese. The Greek Catholics are assigned to the pastoral care of the Latin Church clergy of the Catholic Church in Montenegro.

== Demographics ==
According to the 2011 official census, of the total 21,299 Catholics in Montenegro, there were:

- 7,954 Albanians (37.34%)
- 5,667 Montenegrins (26.61%)
- 5,527 Croats (25.95%)
- 2,151 others (10.01%)

The highest concentration of Catholics is in the Diocese of Kotor, covering coastal areas long under Venetian influence and largely made up of Croat Catholics. The rest of Montenegro is covered by the Archdiocese of Bar, in which there were a total of 12,165 Catholics, mainly Albanian Catholics, in 2006, in the following settlements:

- Tuzi – 4,510
- Podgorica – 1,738
- Bar – 1,610
- Ulcinj – 947
- Štoj – 491
- Bratica – 475
- Hoti – 440
- Koja – 404
- Sveti Đorđe – 251
- Trieshi – 249
- Gruda – 232
- Kolonza – 219
- Zupci – 180
- Cetinje – 165
- Gusinje – 80
- Klezna – 91
- Ljara – 41
- Nikšić – 30
- Šestan – 12

== World Heritage Site ==
The Kotor Cathedral is designated as a World Heritage Site.

== See also ==
- Religion in Montenegro
- Eastern Catholic Churches
- List of Catholic dioceses in Montenegro
- Eastern Orthodoxy in Montenegro

== Sources ==
- Dragojlović, Dragoljub (1990). "Dyrrachium et les Évéchés de Doclea jusqu'a la fondation de l'Archevéche de Bar" (PDF). Balcanica (21): 201–209.
