= Fraskanjel =

Fraskanjel Фраскањел Freskanjel
- Village
- Location within Montenegro
- Coordinates: 41.9681°N 19.3761°E
- Country: Montenegro
- Region: Coastal
- Municipality: Ulcinj

Population (2011)
  - Total: 57
- Time zone: UTC+1 (CET)
  - Summer (DST): UTC+2 (CEST)
- Car plates: UL

Fraskanjel (Montenegrin Cyrillic: Фраскањел; Albanian: Freskanjel) is a village in the municipality of Ulcinj, southeastern Montenegro. It is located on the west bank of Bojana (Buna), east of Lake Šas. It's one of the smallest villages of Ulcinj with 57 inhabitants, all but one Albanians.
