= Qaf-Perollaj mine =

Chromium mine in Zogaj, Kukës County, Albania

- Location in Albania
- Location: Zogaj, Kukës County, Albania; 42°16′16″N 20°20′56″E
- Products: Chromium
- Opened: 1989

The Qaf-Perollaj mine is a large chromium mine near the village of Zogaj in northern Albania in Kukës County, 256 kilometres (159 mi) north-east of the capital, Tirana. Qaf-Perollaj has one of the largest chromium reserves in Albania, and one of the largest in Europe, with estimated reserves of 0.433 million tonnes of ore grading between 30 and 34% chromium metal. The mine is part of the Tropojë Massif, a 440 square kilometres (170 mi^{2}) area which has a rock thickness between 6 kilometres (3.7 mi) and 8 kilometres (5.0 mi) and contains 286 verified chromium deposits and occurrences. The deposit has been explored to depths of up to 300 metres (980 ft); the geological reserves amount to 6.1 million tonnes grading 26.48% chromium metal.

The Qaf-Perollaj mine began operating in 1989. The total combined chromium ore production from the mine between 1989 and 2006 amounted to 40,000 tonnes. The deepest level of the mine is Level +565, which reaches a depth of 370 metres (1,210 ft). The chromium ore reserves of the mine are split into two categories above and below Profile 16. The proven ore reserves located above the Level +565 amount to 433,000 tonnes of ore grading between 30 and 34% chromium metal. The proven ore reserves located below the Level +565 are currently not estimated or calculated but are expected to be grading 40% chromium metal. The mine was privatised in 2004.
