= Gornji Štoj =

Gornji Štoj Горњи Штој Shtoji i Epërm
- Village
- Location within Montenegro
- Coordinates: 41.8881°N 19.3514°E
- Country: Montenegro
- Region: Coastal
- Municipality: Ulcinj

Population (2011)
  - Total: 107
- Time zone: UTC+1 (CET)
  - Summer (DST): UTC+2 (CEST)

Gornji Štoj (Montenegrin Cyrillic: Горњи Штој; Albanian: Shtoji i Epërm) is a village in the municipality of Ulcinj, Montenegro. It is located close to the Albanian border.

== Demographics ==
According to the 2011 census, its population was 107.

Ethnicity in 2011
Ethnicity	Number	Percentage
Albanians	94	87.9%
other/undeclared	13	12.1%
Total	107	100%
