= Ambula, Ulcinj =

Ambula Амбула Amulli
- Village
- Location within Montenegro
- Coordinates: 41°58′49″N 19°21′09″E
- Country: Montenegro
- Region: Coastal
- Municipality: Ulcinj

Population (2011)
  - Total: 34
- Time zone: UTC+1 (CET)
  - Summer (DST): UTC+2 (CEST)

Ambula (Montenegrin Cyrillic: Амбула; Albanian: Amulli) is a village in the municipality of Ulcinj, southeastern Montenegro, located near the Albanian border.

== Demographics ==
According to the census of 2003 the village had a population of 195. All of the residents were ethnic Albanians. The population is much older because of migration by young people to find jobs. The average age of the population is 48.7 years.

According to the 2011 census, its population was 34, all but one of them Albanians.
