= Mide, Ulcinj =

Mide Миде Millë
- Village
- Location within Montenegro
- Coordinates: 42.038150°N 19.264852°E
- Country: Montenegro
- Region: Coastal
- Municipality: Ulcinj

Population (2011)
  - Total: 234
- Time zone: UTC+1 (CET)
  - Summer (DST): UTC+2 (CEST)

Mide (Montenegrin Cyrillic: Миде; Albanian: Millë) is a village in the municipality of Ulcinj, Montenegro.

== Demographics ==
According to the 2011 census, its population was 234, all but 3 of them Albanians.
