= Kolonza =

Kolonza Колонза Kollomzë
- Village
- Location within Montenegro
- Coordinates: 41.940630°N 19.240929°E
- Country: Montenegro
- Region: Coastal
- Municipality: Ulcinj

Population (2011)
  - Total: 228
- Time zone: UTC+1 (CET)
  - Summer (DST): UTC+2 (CEST)

Kolonza (Montenegrin Cyrillic: Колонза; Albanian: Kollomzë) is a village in the municipality of Ulcinj, Montenegro.

== Demographics ==
According to the 2011 census, its population was 228.

Ethnicity in 2011
Ethnicity	Number	Percentage
Albanians	144	63.2%
Montenegrins	43	18.9%
other/undeclared	41	18.0%
Total	228	100%
