= Zoganj =

Zoganj Зогањ Zogaj
- Village
- Location within Montenegro
- Coordinates: 41.9489°N 19.2836°E
- Country: Montenegro
- Region: Coastal
- Municipality: Ulcinj

Population (2011)
  - Total: 397
- Time zone: UTC+1 (CET)
  - Summer (DST): UTC+2 (CEST)

Zoganj (Montenegrin Cyrillic: Зогањ; Albanian: Zogaj) is a village in the municipality of Ulcinj, Montenegro.

== Name ==
The name comes from the Albanian word "zog" meaning bird.

== Demographics ==
According to the 2011 census, its population was 397.

Ethnicity in 2011
Ethnicity	Number	Percentage
Albanians	250	63.0%
Montenegrins	102	25.7%
Serbs	23	5.8%
Muslims	12	3.0%
other/undeclared	10	2.5%
Total	397	100%
