= Donji Štoj =

Donji Štoj Доњи Штој Shtoji i Poshtëm
- Village
- Location within Montenegro
- Coordinates: 41.9062°N 19.3016°E
- Country: Montenegro
- Region: Coastal
- Municipality: Ulcinj

Population (2011)
  - Total: 1,120
- Time zone: UTC+1 (CET)
  - Summer (DST): UTC+2 (CEST)

Donji Štoj (Montenegrin Cyrillic: Доњи Штој; Albanian: Shtoji i Poshtëm) is a village in the municipality of Ulcinj, Montenegro. Donji Štoj is located on the first half of the Long Beach, Adriatic Sea. On the north side of the village is saline - park "Bajo Sekulić".

== Demographics ==
According to the 2011 census, its population was 1,120.

Ethnicity in 2011
Ethnicity	Number	Percentage
Albanians	551	49.2%
Bosniaks	176	15.7%
Montenegrins	164	14.6%
Serbs	110	9.8%
other/undeclared	119	10.6%
Total	1,120	100%
