= Bratica =

Bratica Братица Braticë
- Village
- Location within Montenegro
- Coordinates: 41.951255°N 19.195025°E
- Country: Montenegro
- Region: Coastal
- Municipality: Ulcinj

Population (2011)
  - Total: 233
- Time zone: UTC+1 (CET)
  - Summer (DST): UTC+2 (CEST)

Bratica (Montenegrin Cyrillic: Братица; Albanian: Braticë) is a village in the municipality of Ulcinj, Montenegro.

== Demographics ==
According to the 2011 census, its population was 233.

Ethnicity in 2011
Ethnicity	Number	Percentage
Albanians	156	67.0%
Montenegrins	41	17.6%
Bosniaks	9	3.9%
Serbs	7	3.0%
other/undeclared	20	8.6%
Total	233	100%
