= Šas =

Village in Coastal Montenegro

Šas Шас Shas
- Village
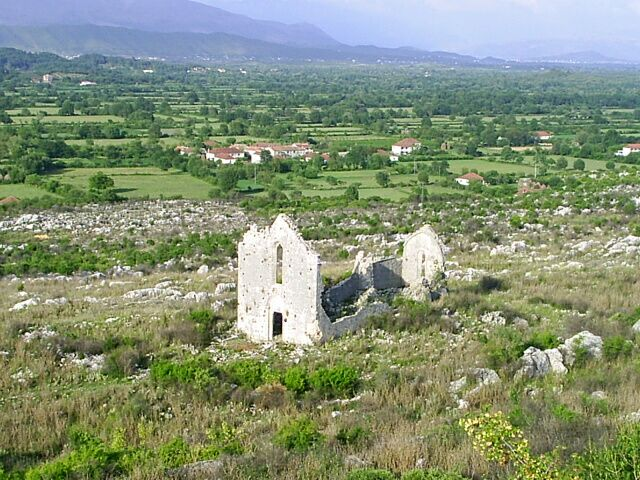
- Church of St. Mary

- Location within Montenegro
- Coordinates: 41°59′18″N 19°19′07″E
- Country: Montenegro
- Region: Coastal
- Municipality: Ulcinj

Population (2011)
  - Total: 238
- Time zone: UTC+1 (CET)
  - Summer (DST): UTC+2 (CEST)
- Area code: +382 30
- Car plates: UL

Šas (also called Svač) (Montenegrin Cyrillic: Шас or Свач; Albanian: Shas; Italian: Sant'Asteio) is a village in Montenegro. According to the 2011 census, the village had a population of 268 people. It is located east of Ulcinj.

In the vicinity of the village is its eponymous lake named Lake Šas.

Vladimir Hill, near Šas, has an unknown fortification with a church, and is believed to be the location of Oblik, a significant fortification mentioned in the Chronicle of the Priest of Duklja.

== History ==
=== Etymology ===
It is believed that Šas / Svač is named after Illyrian martyr Saint Astius.

The Latin form of the Šas / Svač is Suacia, and is formed from the abbreviation of sanctus (saint) – Su. and the Astius. The combination Su+Astius forms Suastius, and through the phoneme shift st → c, Suastius becomes Suacius, which in the feminine form is Suacia.

The Albanian and Montenegrin forms of Šas / Svač are not formed via translation from the Latin form. Instead, however, they are formed based on localised translations of Saint Astius.

- The Albanian form of Šas / Svač is Shas, and is formed similarly to the Latin form. Saint Astius in Albanian is Shën Asti. The first two letters of both words form Shas. The modern-day term Šas in Montenegrin is a borrowing from Albanian.
- The Montenegrin form of Šas / Svač is Svač, and is also formed similarly to the Latin form. Saint Astius in Montenegrin is Sveti Astije. Like in Latin, a phoneme shift also occurs, st → č. After the phoneme shift, the first two letters of both words form Svač.

=== Pre-history ===
In 1985, fragments of prehistoric pottery were found in the rocks. Even if the pottery was from various epochs, it was not separated by layers. On the eastern end, several fragments were found decorated with fingernails, which possibly indicates early Neolithic origin. These fragments also show trace amounts of quartz and silex. Chalcolithic pottery was also found in the same area, with findings from a ditch in the upper part of the town dating from the same era, or slightly younger, from the Bronze Age.

The most numerous findings were of Iron Age pottery, found in several trenches, in the upper part of town and a great part of the suburbium. Such findings provide evidence for the existence of an Iron Age fort. This idea is also supplemented by constructed dry walls built of certain large stones. This type of stone was also found in some walls of medieval Svač.

Fragments of some Hellenistic pottery was found in the waterfalls east of Svač, suggesting that a Hellenistic layer could exist in the northern outskirts. Fragments of thin-walled pottery in red and yellow colors, possibly Roman, were discovered in the upper fort and in the outskirts by the northern waterfalls beneath the city.

=== Medieval history ===
Svač was first mentioned in the 1067 in a papal bull by Pope Alexander II as "Svacia Civitas" (literally "city-state of Suacia"). However, it is believed to have been founded in the 6th century during the reign of Justinian I.

In 1183, Serbian ruler Stefan Nemanja conquered the town. In 1242, following their failed invasion of Ulcinium, the Mongols led by Kadan (grandson of Genghis Khan) destroyed Svač and slaughtered its inhabitants. The ruins remaining from the Mongol invasion are today known by the locals as kishat, Albanian for churches.

Historical sources indicate that the Serbian Queen Helen of Anjou ordered its reconstruction in the late 13th century. Jelena was residing at Ulcinj at the time. However, the town's structures were starting to collapse in ca. early 15th century as evidenced by a letter to Venice in 1406 written by the Archbishop of Svač, pleading for monetary funding to renovate the town's walls.

From what we can see in one Latin manuscript in the 14th century (The Directorium ad passagium faciendum 1332 ) we get a clear indication of the demographics of the area of that time including Šas in the Middle Ages; "The Latins have six towns with bishops: firstly Antibarum (Bar), the seat of the archbishop, then Chatarensis (Kotor), Dulcedinensis (Ulcinj), Suacinensis (Shas), Scutarensis (Shkodra) and Drivascensis (Drisht), which are inhabited by the Latins alone. Outside the town walls, the Albanians make up the population throughout the diocese.". note; this area would later be incorporated into Albania veneta (Venetian Albania) in the 15th century but would be lost later on to the Ottomans according to Dalmatian historian Luigi Paulucci.

== Demographics ==
Population of Šas
Year	Pop.	±%
1948	207	—
1953	226	+9.2%
1961	249	+10.2%
1971	277	+11.2%
1981	329	+18.8%
1991	355	+7.9%
2003	268	−24.5%
2011	238	−11.2%

According to Montenegro's 2011 census, Šas has a population of 238 of which 116 are men (48.7%) and 122 are women (51.3%). A significant portion of the population (189, or 81.5%) is over the age of 15.

According to Montenegro's 2011 census, all residents of Šas are ethnically Albanian and consider Albanian to be their mother tongue. All 238 residents practice Islam.

Ethnicity	Number	Percentage
Albanians	238	100.00%
Others	0	0%
Total	238	100%

== Culture ==
Cathedral of St. John: A) Basis, B) Longitudinal section

Church of St. Mary, A) Foundation, B) Longitudinal section

According to the legend, Svač once had as many churches as there were days, however, much of these churches lay in ruin, with only eight remaining.

Since the city was already deserted in the XV century, it is certain that all its parts belong to the Middle Ages.

In 1533, Genoese Francisco Giustiniani wrote that in Svač were the ruins of 360 churches and chapels. In 1610, Archbishop of Antivari Marin Bici similarly wrote that Svač contained the same number of churches as there were days in a year.

The largest churches in Svač are:

- Cathedral Church of St. John the Baptist – A Romanesque cathedral located at the highest point of the town. It was built in 1300 based on the inscription found on its facade. Based on the fragments remaining on its western wall, it is assumed that the church was built on an older church that was demolished by the Mongols.
- Church of St. Mary – A Gothic-styled Franciscan church located on a plateau in the lower part of town. It is believed to have been built after 1300.

Based on archeological studies, certain Slavic rituals, such as "trizna" (funerary rite), were recorded in Svač. It is known that vessels were placed into graves in Svač, which is also seen in the Albanian town of Lezhë.

Pottery shards decorated by wavy and upright lines drawn by a comb found in Svač suggest a Slavic migration from the Danube to Scutari. This style of pottery appears ca. early 7th century, originating from the regions around Vienna and Bratislava.

Byzantine style pots dating from the latter half of the 12th century appear in Svač, similar to those found in modern-day Bulgaria. However, nearly all kitchen pottery in Svač adhere to a Roman Catholic cultural foundation. However, toward the end of the town's existence, a notable presence of imported pots of possible Venetian origin occurs. These pots bear a striking resemblance to those found in Istria and Dalmatia.

All findings of amphora are of Byzantine origin and span between the 6th and 12th centuries.

== Economy ==
Svač was once located on an important trade route between Ulcinj and Scutari. About thirty coins were found in the town. Two are of Nemanyid origin, several Byzantine dating from the last quarter of the 14th century, of which three were minted in Bar and Kotor, two in Scutari and in an unknown city, possibly Ulcinj. Two Venetian coins dating from the mid-16th century, one of which was minted in Kotor, and two other coins dating between 18th and 19th centuries. The other coins were unable to be classified. Composition-wise, of the thirty coins found, one coin was gold, two silver and the rest bronze or copper.

It is known that Svač minted its own coins in the 15th century. On its coins, the fortress of Svač is shown with Renaissance figures, its three stories with colonnades and keep.
