= Mala Plaža =

Beach in Montenegro

Coordinates: 41°55′25.0″N 19°12′18.4″E

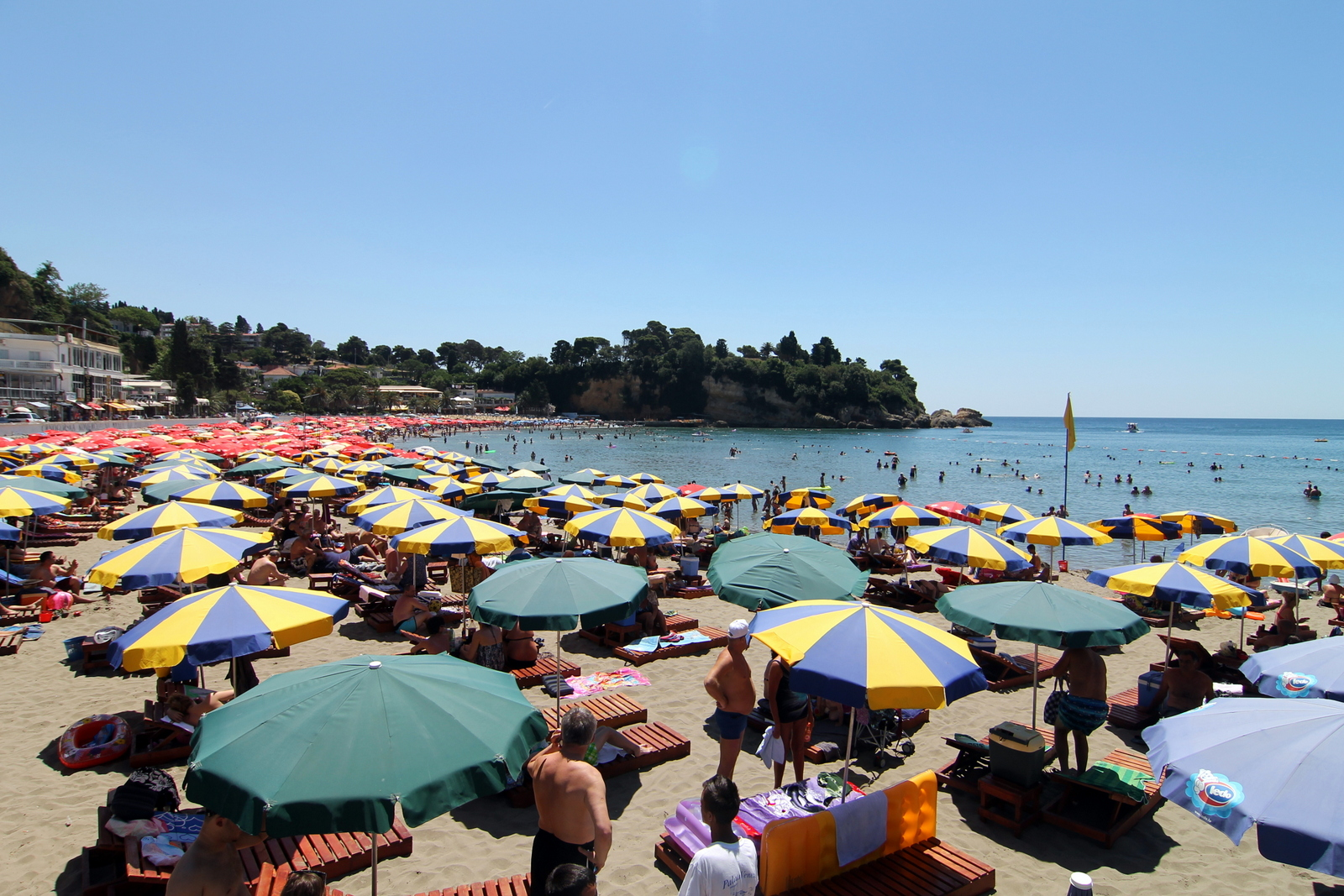
Mala Plaža, with Jadran Peninsula in background

Mala Plaža (Albanian: Plazhi i Vogël, lit. 'Small Beach') also called City Beach (Albanian: Plazhi i Qytetit; Serbian: Gradska Plaža) is a beach in Ulcinj Municipality, Montenegro.

It is located between Ulcinj Castle and Jadran Peninsula. It is the main city beach.

== Overview ==
The length of the beach is 376 meters and the surface is 12.787 m^{2}. It can host over 2,500 vacationers.
