= Zogaj mine =

Chromium mine in Zogaj, Kukës County, Albania

- Location in Albania
- Location: Zogaj, Kukës County, Albania; 42°18′14″N 20°17′56″E
- Products: Chromium
- Opened: 1980
- Closed: 2000

The Zogaj mine is a large mine located near the village Zogaj in northern Albania in Kukës County, 256 kilometres (159 mi) north-east of the capital, Tirana. Zogaj represents one of the largest chromium reserve in Albania and one of the largest in Europe having estimated reserves of 1.238 million tonnes of ore grading between 24 and 28% chromium metal. The mine is part of the Tropojë Massif, a 440 square kilometres (170 mi^{2}) area which has a rock thickness between 6 kilometres (3.7 mi) and 8 kilometres (5.0 mi) and contains 286 verified chromium deposits and occurrences. The deposit has been explored to depths of up to 300 metres (980 ft) and the geological reserves amount to 6.1 million tonnes grading 26.48% chromium metal.

The Zogaj mine began operating in 1980. The total combined chromium ore production from the mine between 1980 and 2000 amounted to 520,000 tonnes. The deepest level of the mine is the Level +480 which reaches a depth of 370 metres (1,210 ft). The chromium ore reserves of the mine are split into two categories above and below Level +480. The proven ore reserves located above the Level +480 amount to 1,238,000 tonnes of ore grading between 24 and 28% chromium metal. The proven ore reserves located below the Level +480 are currently not estimated or calculated but are expected to be grading over 30% chromium metal. The mine's total reserves amount to 1.238 million tonnes of ore grading between 24 and 28% chromium metal. Currently the mine is unoccupied and is closed since 2000. The Zogaj mine is one of the eight Albanian chromium mines to have reserves of over 1 million tonnes of chromium ore.
