= Ulcinj Municipality =

Ulcinj Municipality Opština Ulcinj Општина Улцињ Komuna e Ulqinit
- Municipality
- Flag Coat of arms

- Ulcinj Municipality in Montenegro
- Country: Montenegro
- Seat: Ulcinj

Area
  - Total: 255 km^{2} (98 sq mi)

Population (2011)
  - Total: 20,290
  - Density: 79.6/km^{2} (206/sq mi)
- Demonym(s): Ulcinjani; Ulqinakë
- Time zone: UTC+1 (CET)
  - Summer (DST): UTC+2 (CEST)
- Postal code: 85360
- Area code: +382 30
- ISO 3166-2 code: ME-20
- Website: Official Website

Ulcinj Municipality (Montenegrin: Opština Ulcinj / Општина Улцињ, Albanian: Komuna e Ulqinit) is the southernmost municipality of Montenegro, bordered by Albania to the east, Bar Municipality to the north and Adriatic Sea to the south and the west. It has an area of 255 km², and a population of 19,921 as of the 2011 census. Its seat is the town of Ulcinj.

== Geography and tourism ==
On a hilltop overlooking the shore, Ulcinj is a popular tourist destination for its Long Beach, Valdanos, Lake Šas, and Ada Bojana Island, and for its 2000-year-old Ulcinj Castle. There is also a beach called Mala Plaža (also "the City beach") which is much smaller, but is located in the centre of town and very popular with visitors.

"The Korzo", as it is called by locals, is a promenade which separates a street lined with coffee shops from Mala Plaža. On summer nights, the Korzo is closed to car traffic, and families and young people gather there. Many lesser-known smaller beaches are also near the main tourist areas.

Ulcinj has a large number of religious buildings like mosques, türbes and churches, including Pasha's Mosque, Sailors' Mosque, Church-Mosque of Ulcinj and St. Nicholas' Church. Its oldest section is a well preserved castle-style community with features that remain from medieval times.

=== Municipality Day ===
Ulcinj Municipality Day
- Also called: Ulcinj Day
- Observed by: Ulcinj
- Type: Local
- Significance: End of olive collection Sailor output at the sea Touristic season begins
- Celebrations: Picnics, Concerts, Sport activities, Cocktails
- Date: First Saturday in April
- 2025 date: April 5
- 2026 date: April 4
- 2027 date: April 3
- 2028 date: April 1
- Frequency: annual

Ulcinj Municipality Day (Montenegrin: Dan opštine Ulcinj / Дан општине Улцињ, Albanian: Dita e Komunës së Ulqinit), also called Ulcinj Day (Montenegrin: Dan Ulcinja / Дан Улциња, Albanian: Dita e Ulqinit) is an annual Albanian holiday held every first Saturday of April. It has events such as the Domestic Products Fair and the Concert, which are usually held in the Rana neighbourhood.

== Local administration ==
=== Local parliament ===
Parties and coalitions	Seats	Gov't.
Democratic Party of Socialists	5	Yes
New Democratic Force	5	Yes
Democratic League in Montenegro	3	No
Democratic Union of Albanians	3	No
Social Democrats	2	Yes
United Reform Action	5	No
Social Democratic Party	1	Yes
Bosniak Party	1	Yes
Albanian Alternative	1	No

=== Settlements ===
The Municipality of Ulcinj has 41 residential areas. As of the 2011 census, the urban center, Ulcinj, had 10,707 inhabitants, or 53.75% of the municipality's population:

Name		Population (2011)	Predominant ethnic group	Predominant religion
Montenegrin	Albanian	Population (2011)	Predominant ethnic group	Predominant religion
Ulcinj	Ulqin	10,707	Albanians 60.89 / 100	Islam 68.15 / 100
Ambula	Amulli	34	Albanians 97.06 / 100	Catholicism 100 / 100
Bijela Gora	Mali i Bardhë	53	Albanians 41.51 / 100	Islam 45.28 / 100
Bojke	Bojk	161	Albanians 99.38 / 100	Islam 100 / 100
Brajše	Brajshë	682	Albanians 100 / 100	Islam 99.85 / 100
Bratica	Braticë	233	Albanians 66.95 / 100	Catholicism 61.80 / 100
Briska Gora	Mali i Brinjës	50	Albanians 50 / 100	Catholicism 50 / 100
Ćurke	Qyrkaj	30	Albanians 100 / 100	Islam 100 / 100
Darza	Darzë	135	Montenegrins 42.22 / 100	Orthodoxy 62.96 / 100
Donja Klezna	Këllezna e Poshtme	126	Albanians 91.27 / 100	Islam 53.97 / 100
Donji Štoj	Shtoji i Poshtëm	1,120	Albanians 49.20 / 100	Islam 40.30 / 100
Draginje	Draginë	72	Albanians 100 / 100	Islam 100 / 100
Fraskanjel	Fraskanjell	57	Albanians 98.25 / 100	Islam 100 / 100
Gornja Klezna	Këllezna e Naltë	165	Albanians 98.18 / 100	Islam 91.51 / 100
Gornji Štoj	Shtoji i Naltë	107	Albanians 87.85 / 100	Catholicism 91.59 / 100
Kodre	Kodra	997	Albanians 80.64 / 100	Islam 74.72 / 100
Kolonza	Kollomzë	228	Albanians 63.16 / 100	Catholicism 46.05 / 100
Kosići	Kosiq	306	Albanians 96.40 / 100	Islam 93.14 / 100
Kravari	Kravari	547	Albanians 100 / 100	Islam 100 / 100
Kruče	Krruç	142	Albanians 47.89 / 100	Islam 59.86 / 100
Kruta	Krytha e Ulqinit	196	Albanians 45.41 / 100	Catholicism 84.69 / 100
Krute	Krythë	525	Albanians 91.43 / 100	Islam 100 / 100
Leskovac	Leskoci	73	Bosniaks 95.89 / 100	Islam 100 / 100
Lisna Bore	Lisna Borë	171	Albanians 100 / 100	Islam 100 / 100
Mide	Millë	234	Albanians 98.72 / 100	Islam 99.14 / 100
Pistula	Pistull	384	Albanians 76.82 / 100	Islam 78.38 / 100
Rastiš	Rashtishë	358	Albanians 100 / 100	Islam 100 / 100
Reč	Reç	61	Albanians 98.36 / 100	Catholicism 100 / 100
Sukobin	Sukubinë	367	Albanians 99.18 / 100	Islam 99.45 / 100
Sutjel	Sutjell	20	Albanians 100 / 100	Catholicism 100 / 100
Sveti Đorđe	Shëngjergj	69	Albanians 100 / 100	Catholicism 100 / 100
Šas	Shas	238	Albanians 100 / 100	Islam 100 / 100
Štodra	Shtodër	112	Albanians 100 / 100	Islam 100 / 100
Vladimir	Katërkollë	757	Albanians 99.60 / 100	Islam 99.47 / 100
Zoganj	Zogaj	397	Albanians 62.97 / 100	Islam 65.24 / 100
Total		19,921	Albanians 70.66 / 100	Islam 71.82 / 100

z - no data or data protected

== Demographics ==
Ulcinj Municipality, has the largest Albanian community in Montenegro, with an approximately 73,5% Albanian population. (The next largest is Tuzi Municipality, with 62,55%.) The city was once home to a Black Montenegrin population.

Ethnicity (2011 census):

- Albanians - 14,076
- Montenegrins - 2,478
- Bosniaks - 1,219
- Serbs - 1,145
- Other - 541
- Not declared - 425

Ethnicity (2023 census):

- Albanians - 15,078 (73,53%)
- Montenegrins - 2,435 (11,9%)
- Bosniaks - 797 (3,89%)
- Serbs - 1025 (5%)
- Other - 1134 (5,09%)

Religion (2011 census):

- Muslims - 14,308
- Orthodox - 2,964
- Catholics - 2,196
- Other religions - 173
- Atheists - 53
- Not declared - 227

== Sister cities ==
Ulcinj is twinned with the borough of Staten Island, New York City.

== Gallery ==
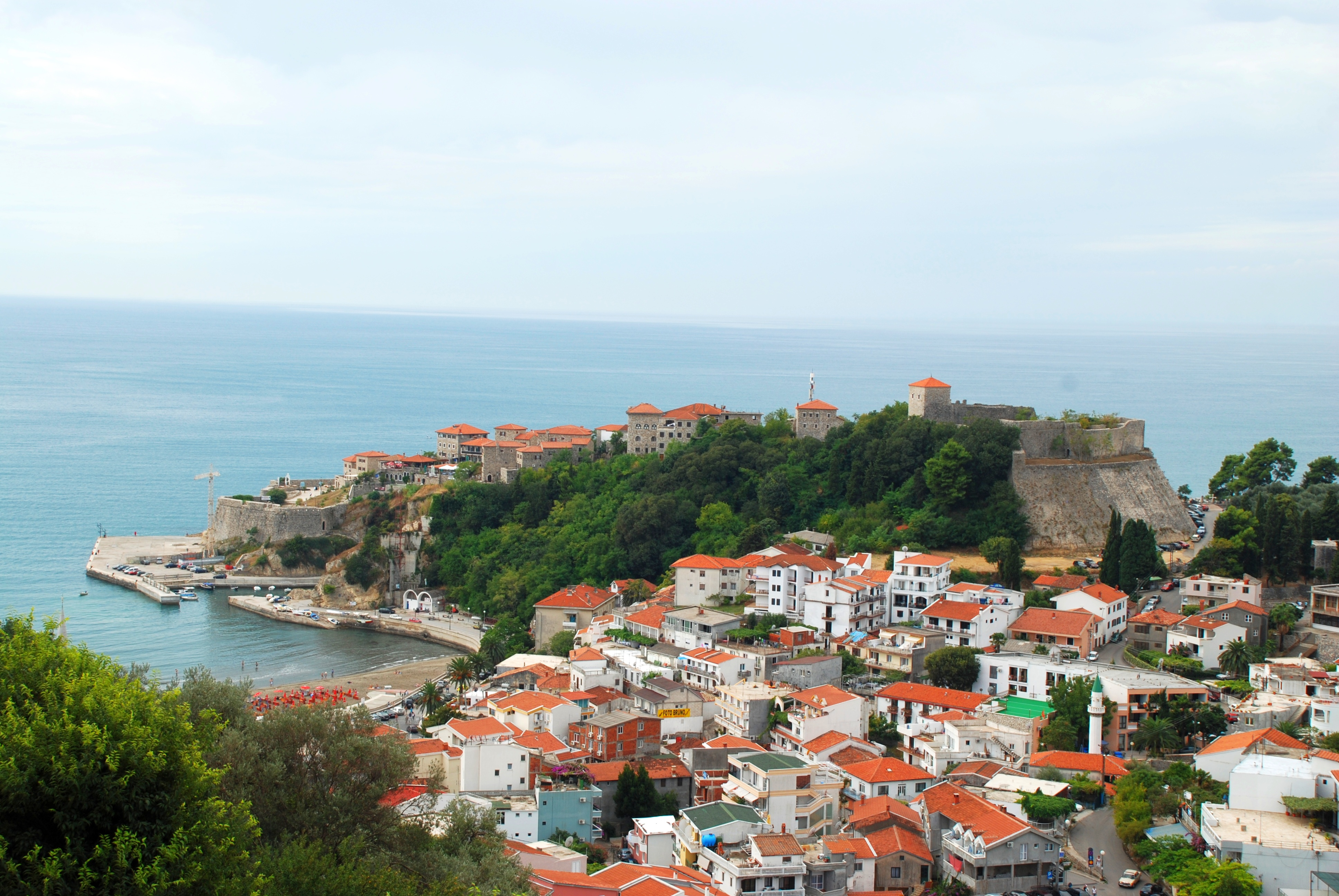
Ulcinj Old Town

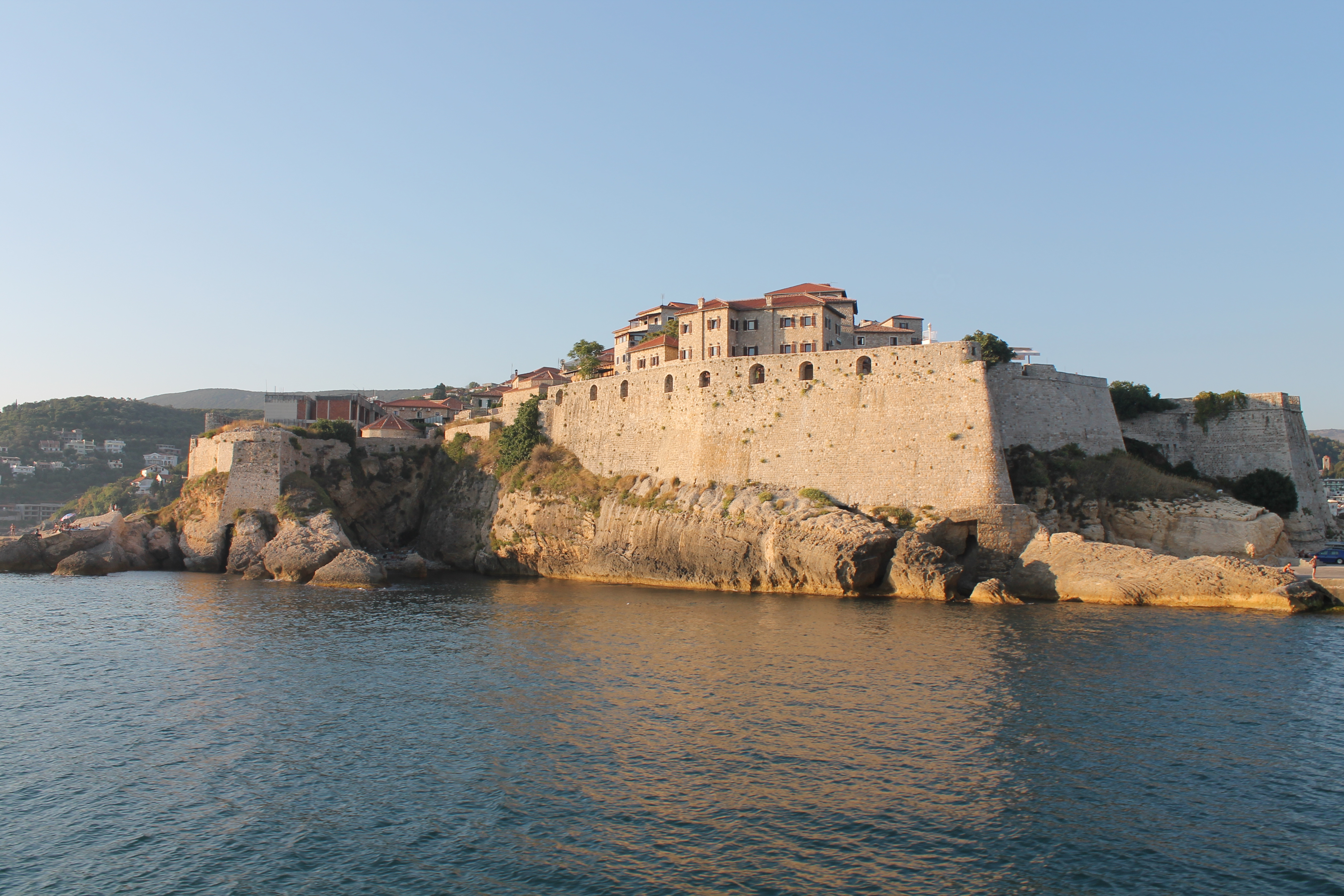
Ulcinj Old Town

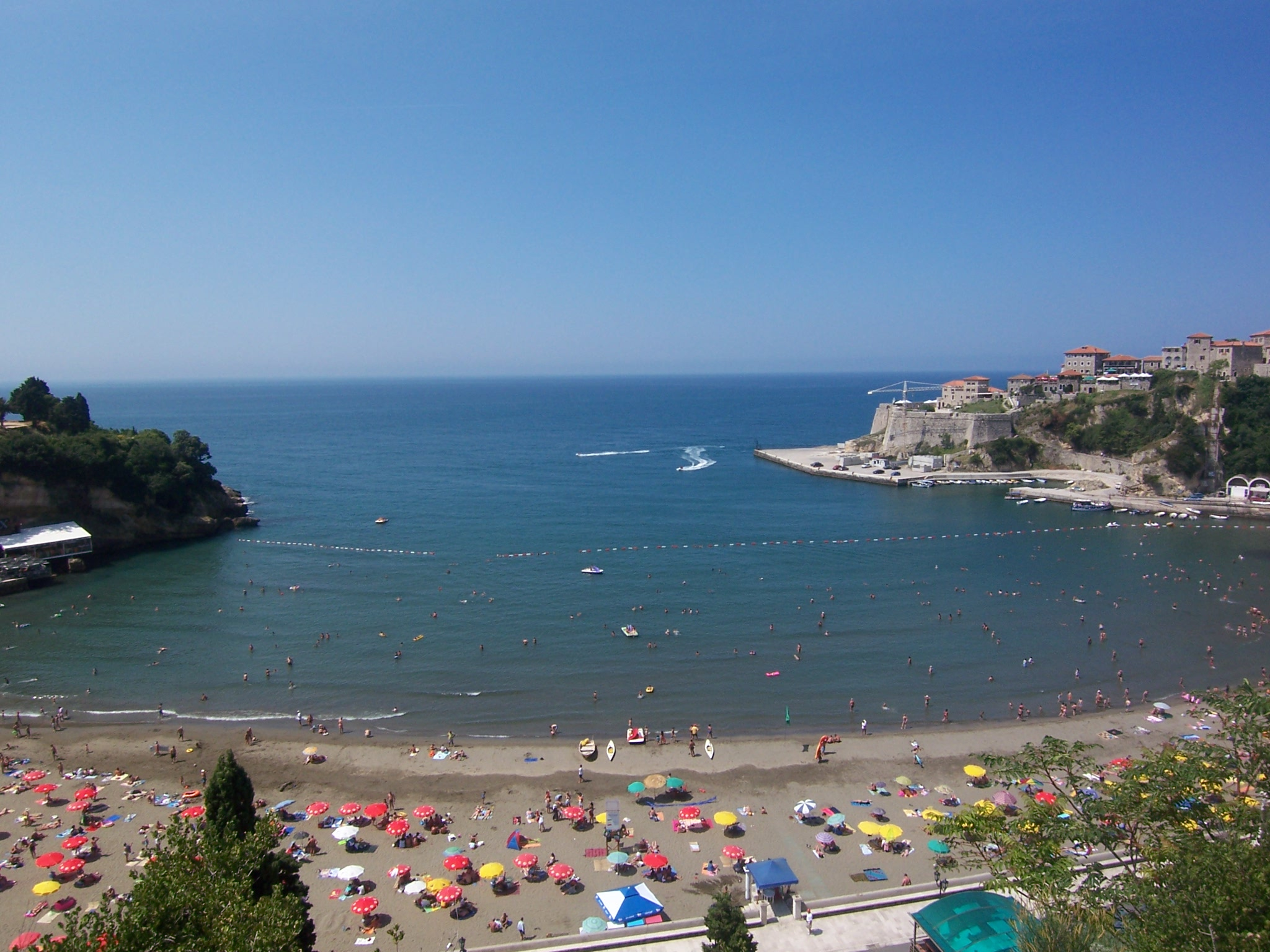
Ulcinj City Beach

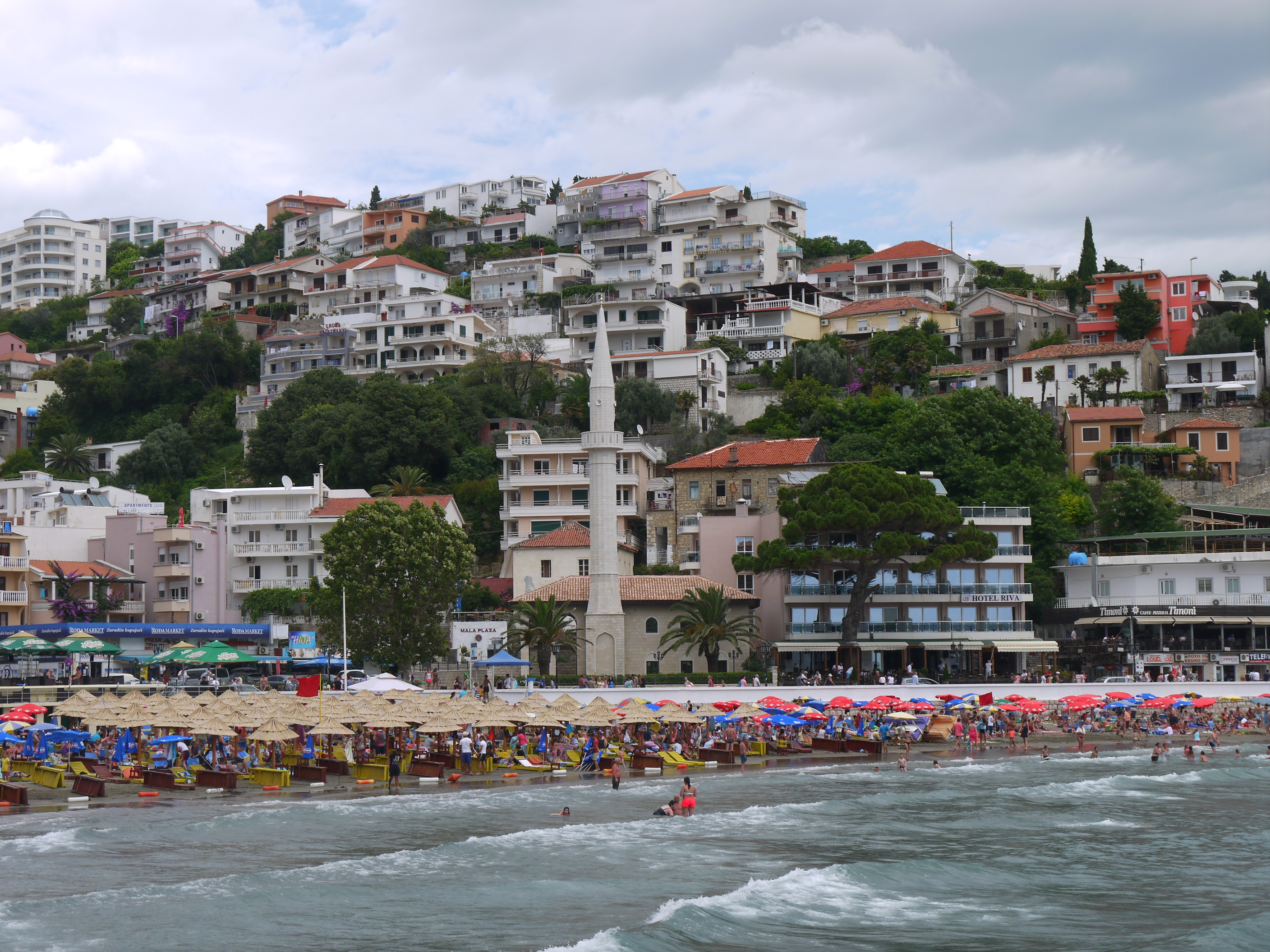
Sailors' Mosque and the City Beach

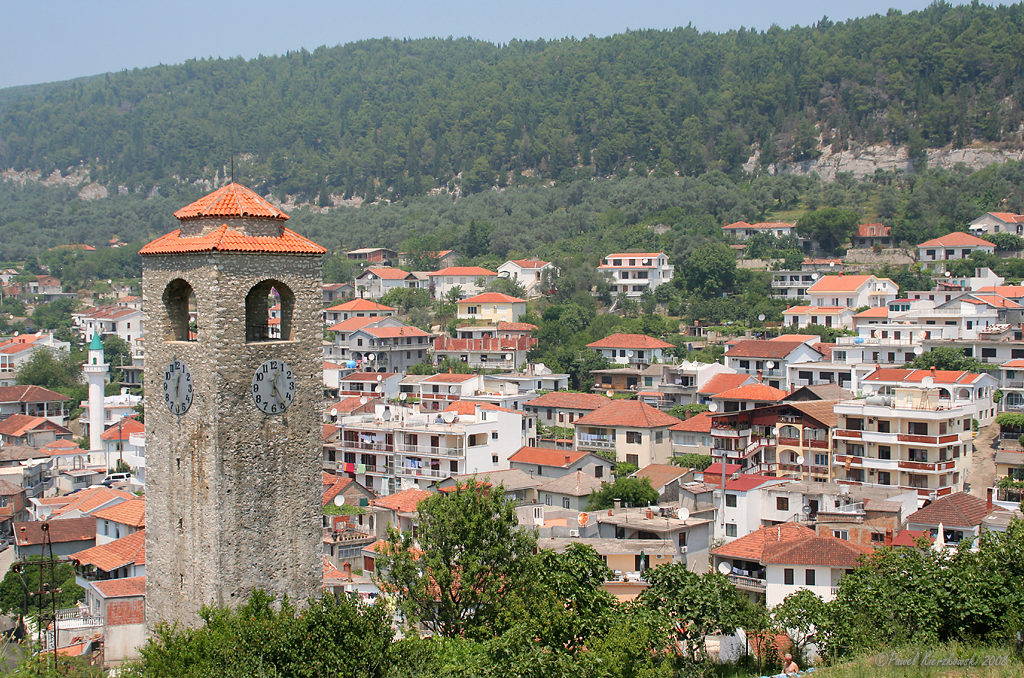
Ulcinj Clock Tower

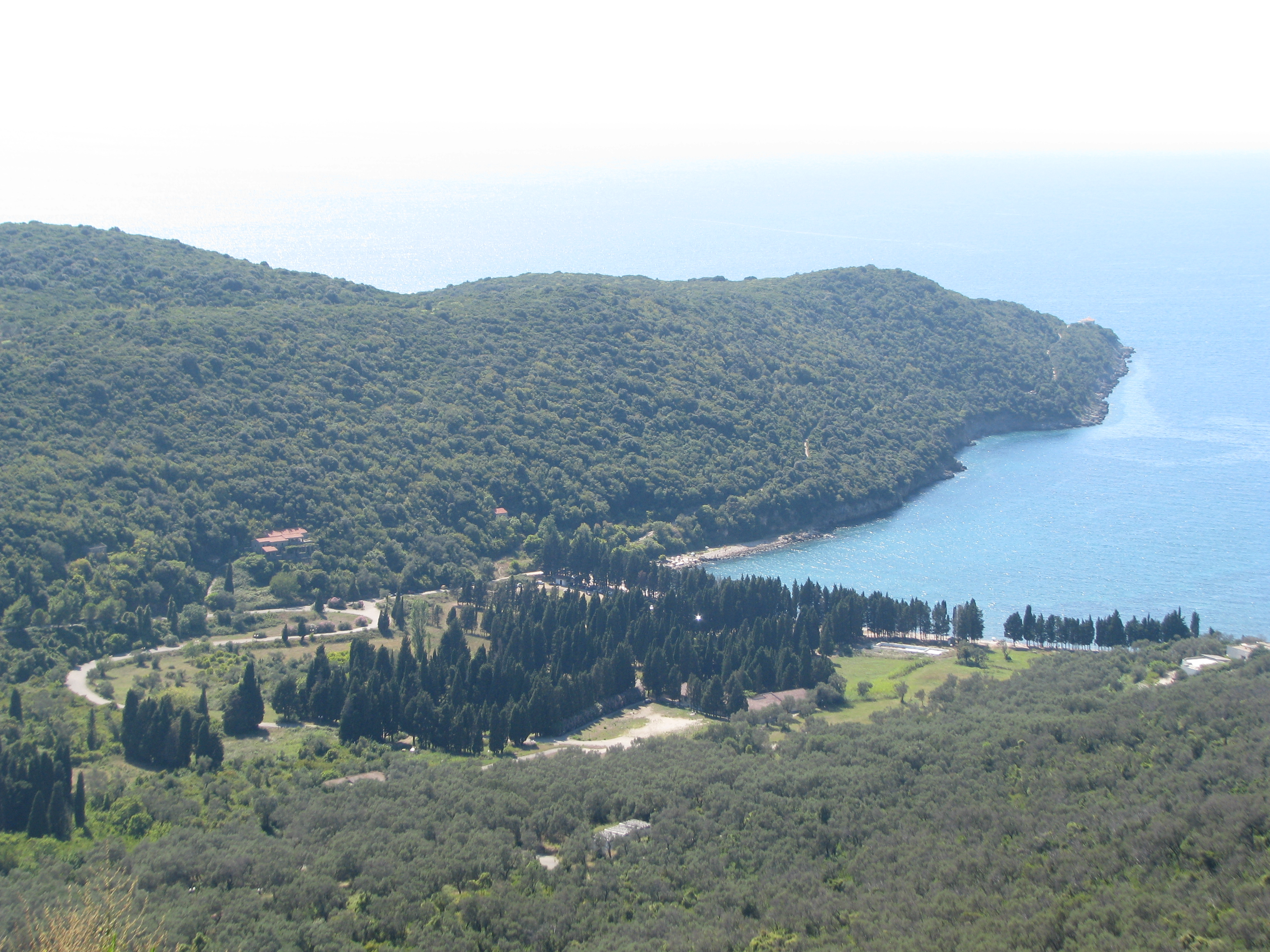
Valdanos inlet

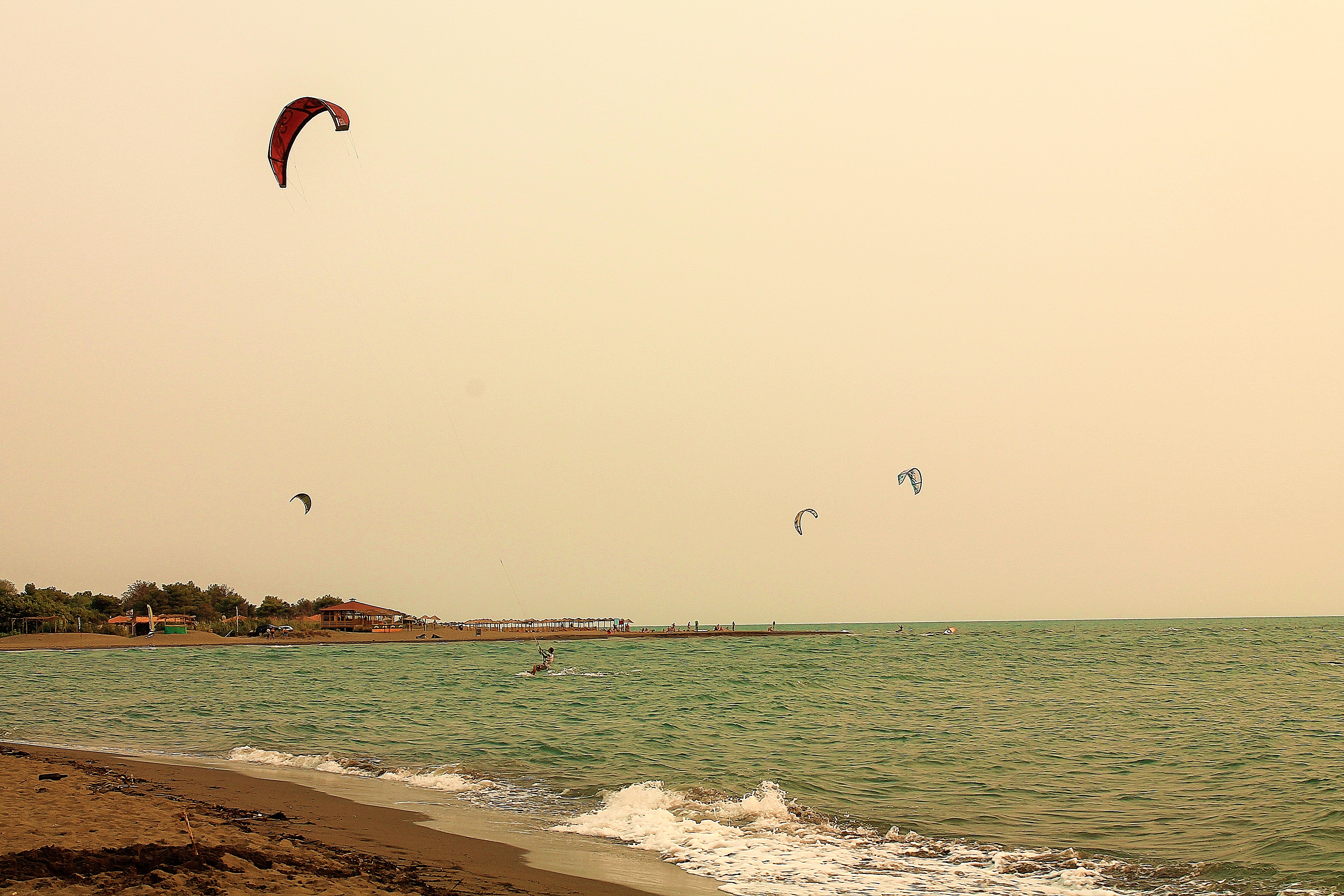
The long Beach

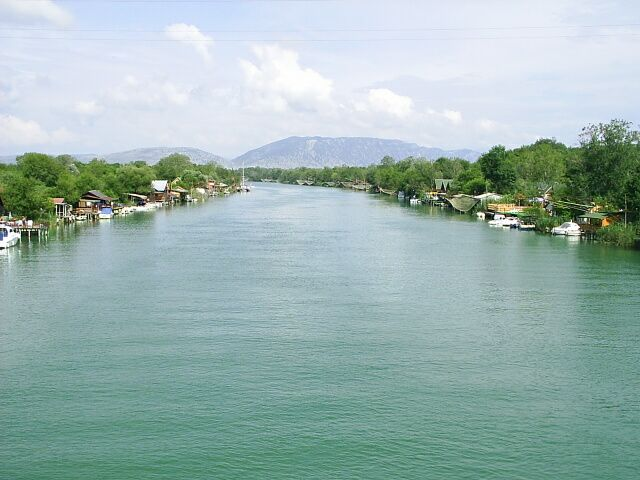
Ada Bojana
