= Zogaj, Kukës =

Zogaj
- Village
- Location within Albania
- Coordinates: 42°17′40″N 20°17′55″E
- Country: Albania
- County: Kukës
- Municipality: Tropojë
- Administrative unit: Bytyç
- Time zone: UTC+1 (CET)
  - Summer (DST): UTC+2 (CEST)

Zogaj is a village in the former municipality of Bytyç in Kukës County, Albania. At the 2015 local government reform it became a part of the municipality Tropojë. There are several chromium mines near the village.

Zogaj is part of the Bytyqi tribal territory, and is therefore situated in the Highlands of Gjakova. The village's name is derived from the personal name zog, which means 'bird' in Albanian. In early documents it was referred to as Bardonja.
