= Coastal Montenegro =

Region of Montenegro

Coastal Montenegro Primorje Crne Gore Приморје Црне Горе
- Region in Montenegro
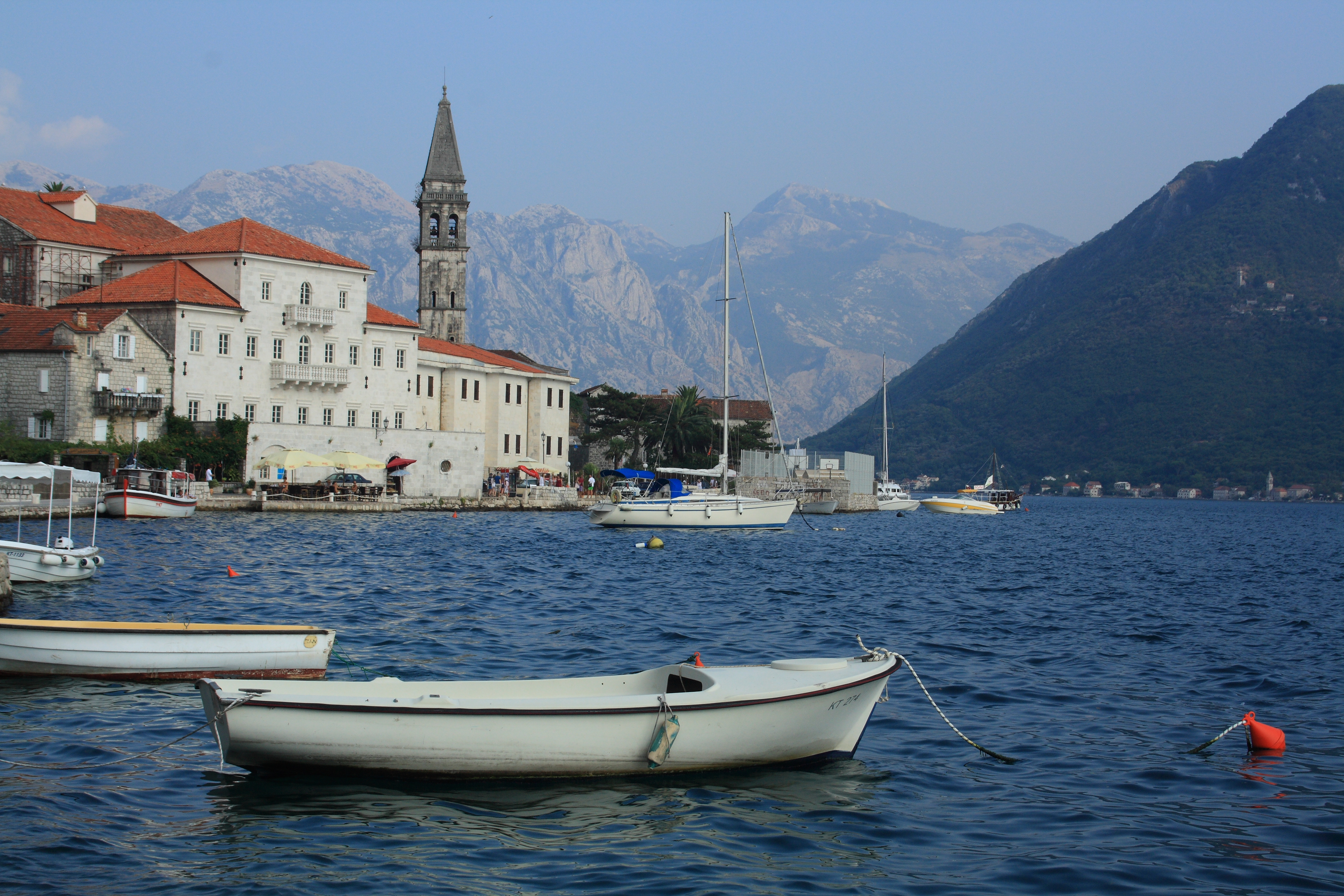
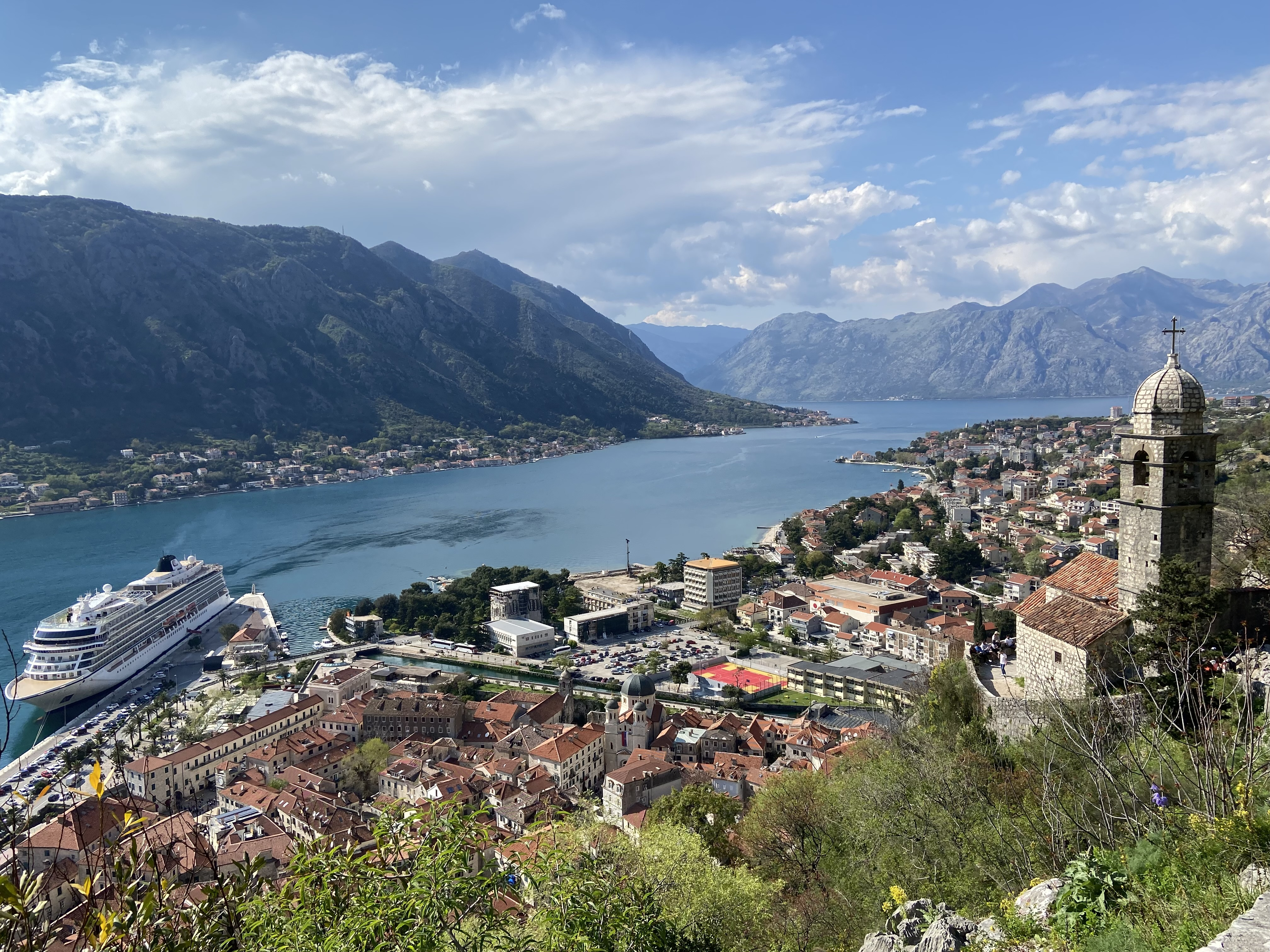
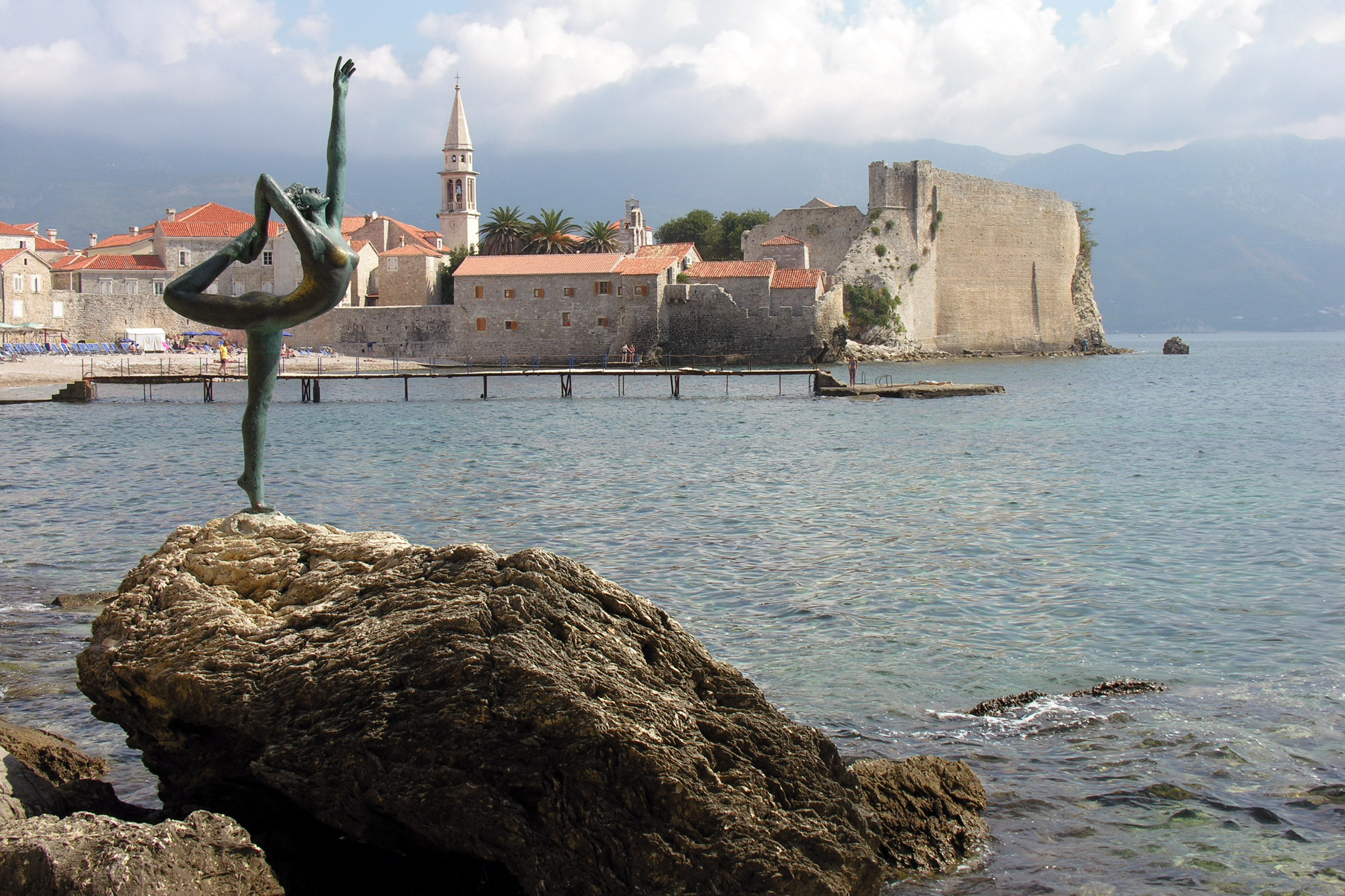
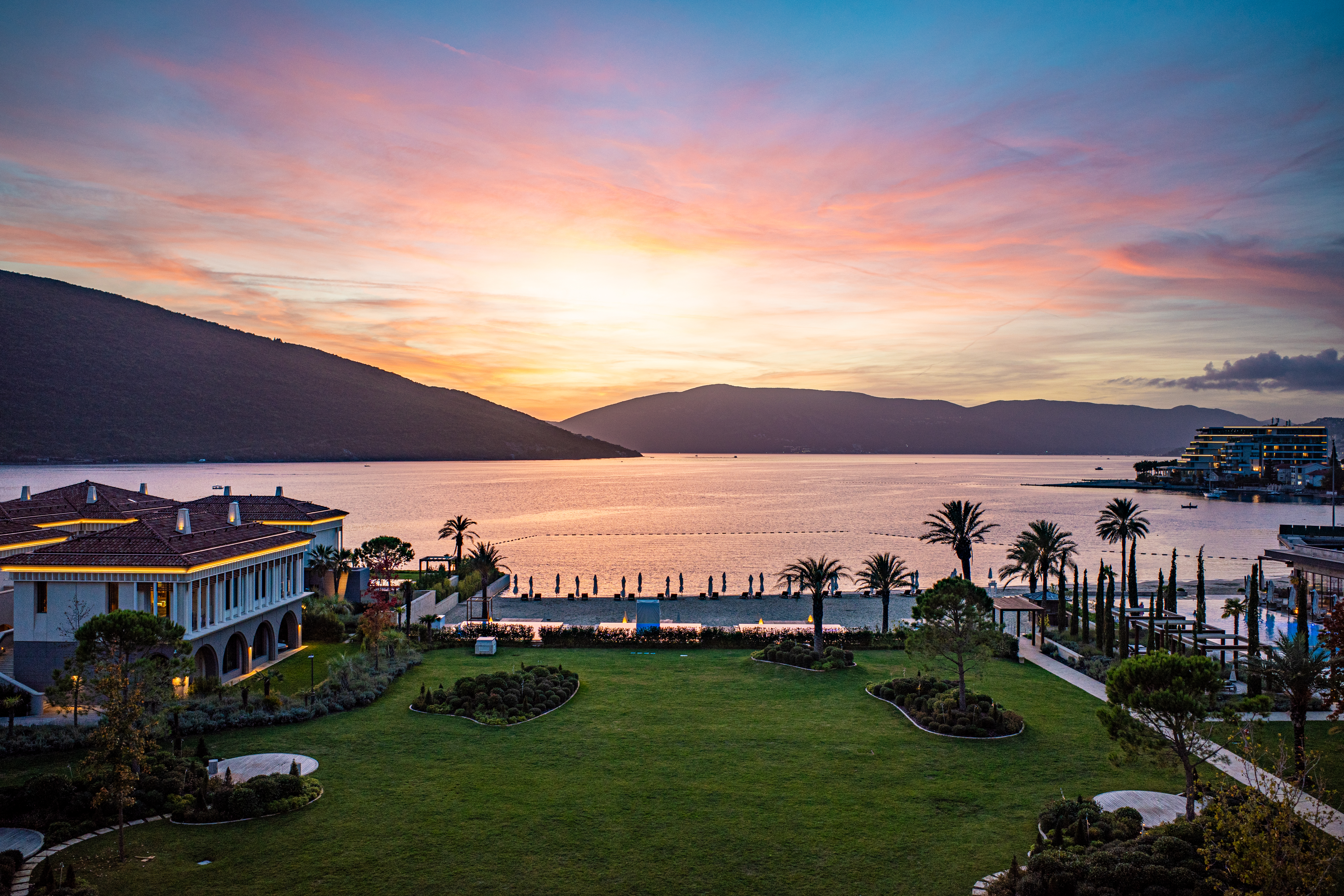
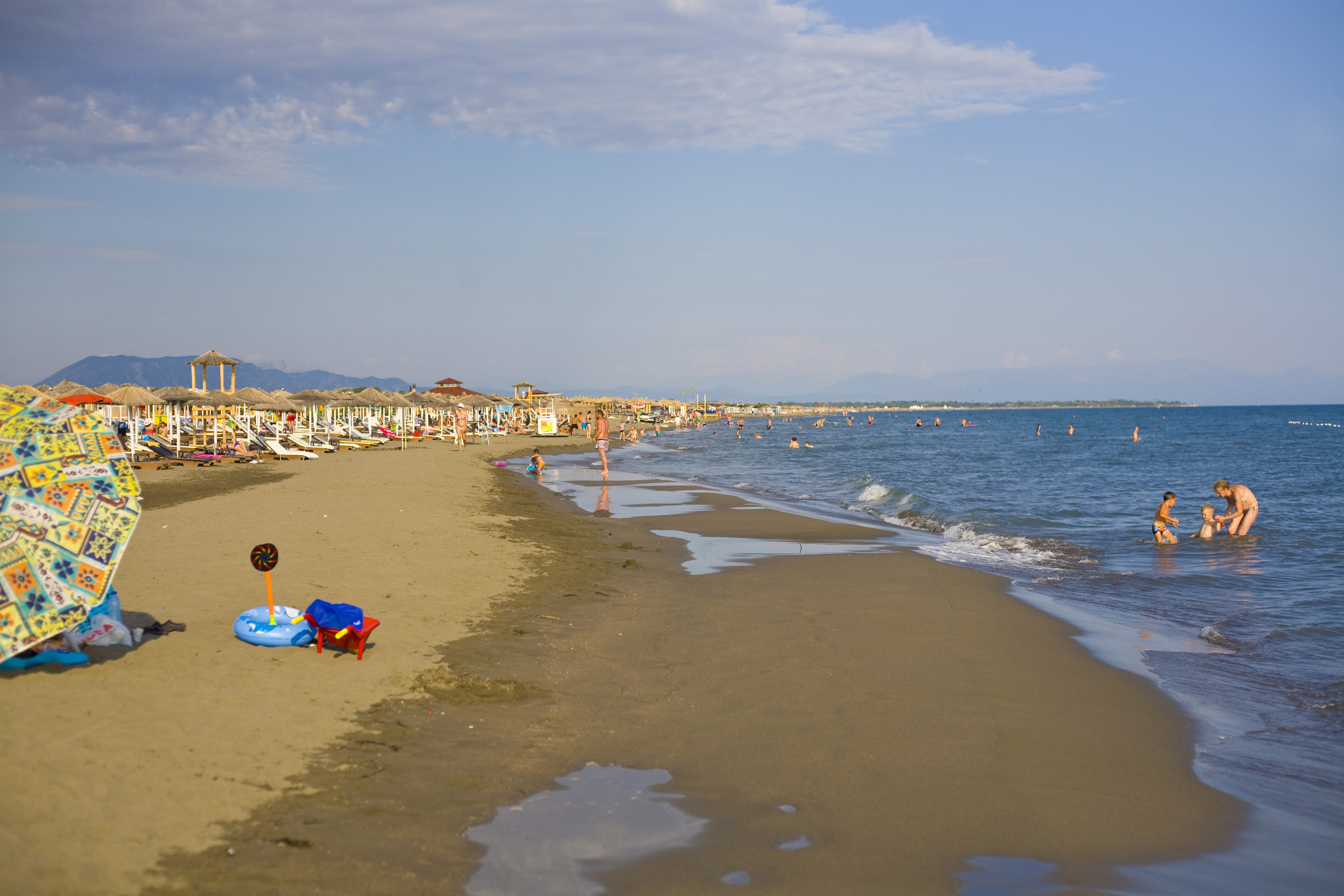
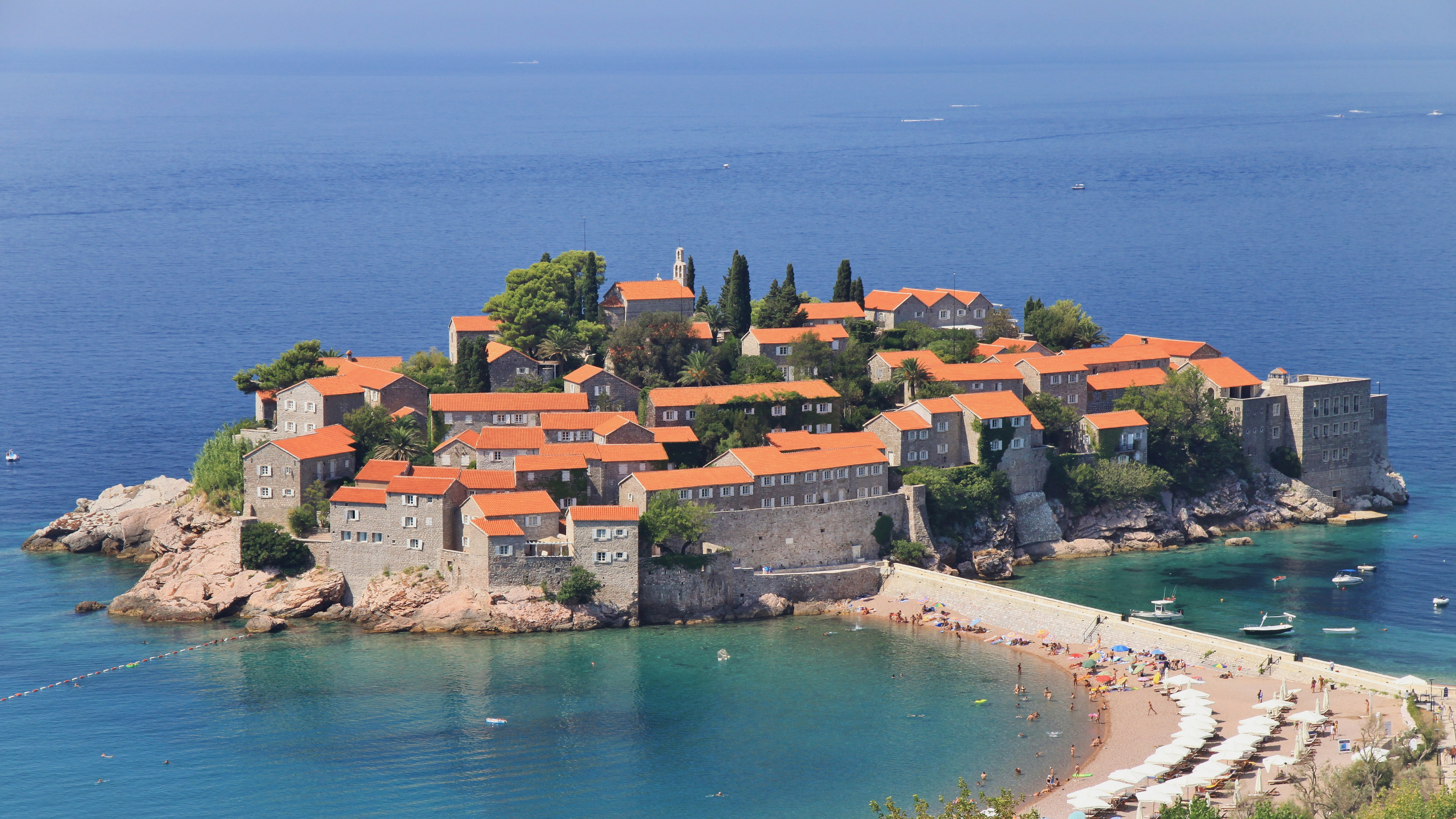
- Perast Kotor Budva Portonovi Long beach Sveti Stefan

- Coastal Montenegro
- Country: Montenegro
- Established: 2006
- Largest city: Bar
- Municipalities: 6: Bar; Budva; Herceg Novi; Kotor; Tivat; Ulcinj

Area
  - Total: 1,591 km^{2} (614 sq mi)

Population (2023)
  - Total: 163,672 ▲
  - Density: 102.9/km^{2} (266.4/sq mi)
- Time zone: UTC+1 (CET)
  - Summer (DST): UTC+2 (CEST)
- HDI: 0.814 (2021) very high · 3rd

Coastal Montenegro (Montenegrin: Primorje Crne Gore / Приморје Црне Горе) is one of three statistical regions in Montenegro. It encompasses the coastal part of Montenegro. It is bordered by Central region to the north, Albania to the east, the Adriatic Sea to the south, Croatia to the west, and Bosnia and Herzegovina to the northwest. It comprises six municipalities.

== Municipalities ==
Coastal Montenegro comprises six municipalities. Municipalities in Coastal Montenegro include: Bar, Budva, Herceg Novi, Kotor, Tivat and Ulcinj.

== Geography ==
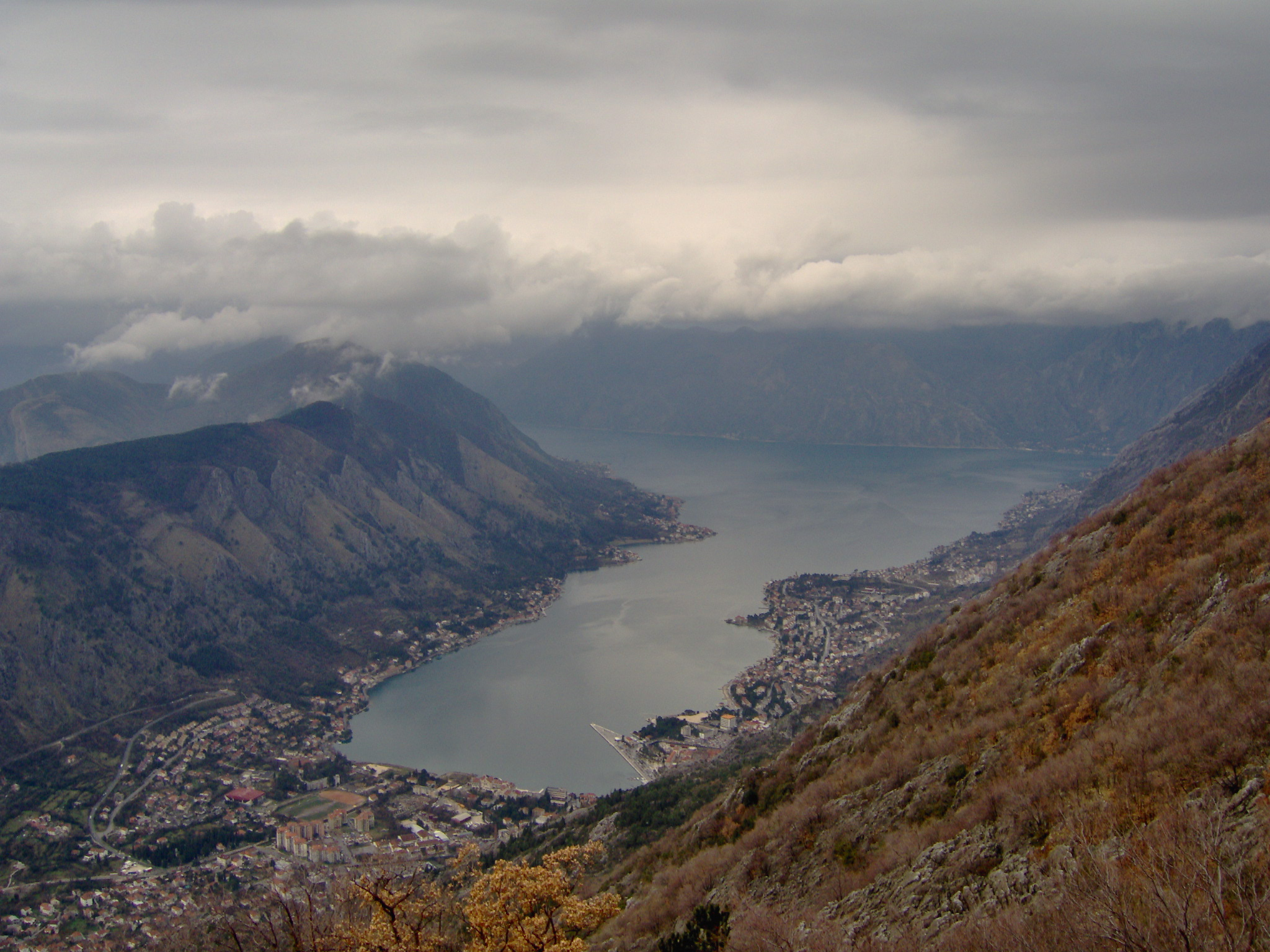
Bay of Kotor region

The coast of Montenegro is 294 km (183 mi) long. Unlike its northern neighbour Croatia, Montenegro has no large inhabited islands along the coast. A notable feature of the Montenegrin coast is Bay of Kotor, a fjord-like gulf, which is in fact a submerged river canyon. The Bay of Kotor is surrounded by mountains up to 1,000 m (3,281 ft) high, which plunge almost vertically into the sea.

To the south of the Bay of Kotor, there is a narrow coastal plain, no more than 4 km wide, which is guarded from the north by high mountains. The plain provided space for numerous small coastal settlements.

== Administration ==
List of current mayors and local governments
Democratic Montenegro (2)
Democratic Party of Socialists (1)
New Serb Democracy (1)
New Democratic Force (1)
Independent (1)

Municipality	Current Mayor	Party	Local government	Elected
Bar	Dušan Raičević	DPS	DPS-SD-SDP-BS	2022
Herceg Novi	Stevan Katić	DCG	DCG-ZBCG-SNP-NL-URA-PCG	2021
Kotor	Vladimir Jokić	DCG	DCG-ZBCG-SNP-URA	2024
Ulcinj	Genci Nimanbegu	Forca	Force-SD-SDP-PD-DPS-BS	2022
Budva	Milo Božović	NSD	ZBCG-SNP	2022
Tivat	Željko Komnenović	Ind.	Independent lists	2022

== Economy ==
=== Tourism ===
The Montenegrin Adriatic coast is 295 km (183 mi) long, with 72 km (45 mi) of beaches and many well-preserved ancient towns. Some of the most popular beaches are Jaz Beach, Mogren Beach, Bečići Beach, Sveti Stefan Beach and Velika Plaža. Meanwhile, some of the most popular ancient towns include Herceg Novi, Perast, Kotor, Budva and Ulcinj.

National Geographic Traveler (edited once a decade) ranks Montenegro among the "50 Places of a Lifetime". Montenegrin seaside town Sveti Stefan was once used as the cover for the magazine. The coast region of Montenegro was considered one of the great "discoveries" among world tourists. In January 2010, The New York Times ranked the Ulcinj South Coast region of Montenegro, including Velika Plaža, Ada Bojana, and the Hotel Mediteran of Ulcinj, among the "Top 31 Places to Go in 2010" as part of a worldwide ranking.

Ulcinj

The coastline of Ulcinj is 32 km long. It has more than 10 beaches. Ada Bojana is a river island. It is triangular in shape, with the sea on one side. The beach is sandy and long. Velika Plaza is the longest beach in Montenegro and is one of the warmest beaches on the Adriatic Sea. It is 12 km long and it is covered with sand. It is very shallow. The small city beach is as same as Velika Plaza but it is not as long. Valdanos is a small cove with pebbly beach and flora around it.

Bar

Bar Riviera is 44 km long and has 9 km of beaches. There are more than 20 beaches, but Bar has two beaches on the lakeside. The main beach in Bar is Sutomore beach. It is 1 km long and is covered with sand. Canj beach is 1 km long and is a tourist location. The beach is covered with fine sand but the sea bottom is covered with round rocky pebbles. Queen's Beach is very near Canj but it can be only approached from the sea. Red beach is specific because it is covered with red round pebbles and the view from it is outstanding. Zukotrlica beach is over 1 km long and it is near the city. It is covered with white pebbles and in the background is a little pine forest. Beach Utjeha is also called "Olive Bay" because there are hundreds of olive trees in the background. It is covered with shingle and is very clear. On the lake there are two beaches: Pjesacac and Murici. They are covered with shingle.

Budva

Budva Riviera has over 25 beaches and they are a favourite destination for tourists in Montenegro. The longest beach is Jaz. It is 2.5 km long and is sandy. Mogren beach has specific small pebbles. It consists of two small beaches and they are connected by a tunnel. Slovenska beach is 1.5 km long and is covered with sand. There are a lot of hotels, restaurants and parks in the background. The Becici beach is long and sandy. Milocer beach, Queen's beach and Sveti Stefan beach are the most exclusive beaches in Montenegro. Pterovac beach is quite long and is covered with little red pebbles. Special attractions there are two small isles and a small fortress near the beach. Buljarica beach is covered with sand and is 2 km long.

Tivat

There are over 15 small beaches in Tivat. Opatovo is a 200 m long shingle beach. A small lighthouse divides the beach into two parts. Beach Plavi Horizonti is perhaps the most famous in Tivat. It is 300 m long and covered with small white pebbles. There are two islands near Tivat: the Island of St. Marko and the Island of Flowers.

Kotor

This is the deepest part of Boka Kotorska so there are fewer beaches. There are about 10 small beaches. Morinj beach is a pebbly beach with views of the bay. Risan beach is a quiet, long and rocky beach. Orahovac is the favourite beach in Kotor. It is pebbly with old stone houses in the background. Trsteno is also a pebbly beach. It is 200 m long with clear water and natural background.

Herceg Novi

Herceg Novi Riviera is 25 km long and it has over 20 beaches. Igalo beach is 1.5 km long and sandy. Rose beach is rocky with very nice forest background. Zanjic beach is located in Herceg Novi. It is 300 m long and it is covered with white pebbles.

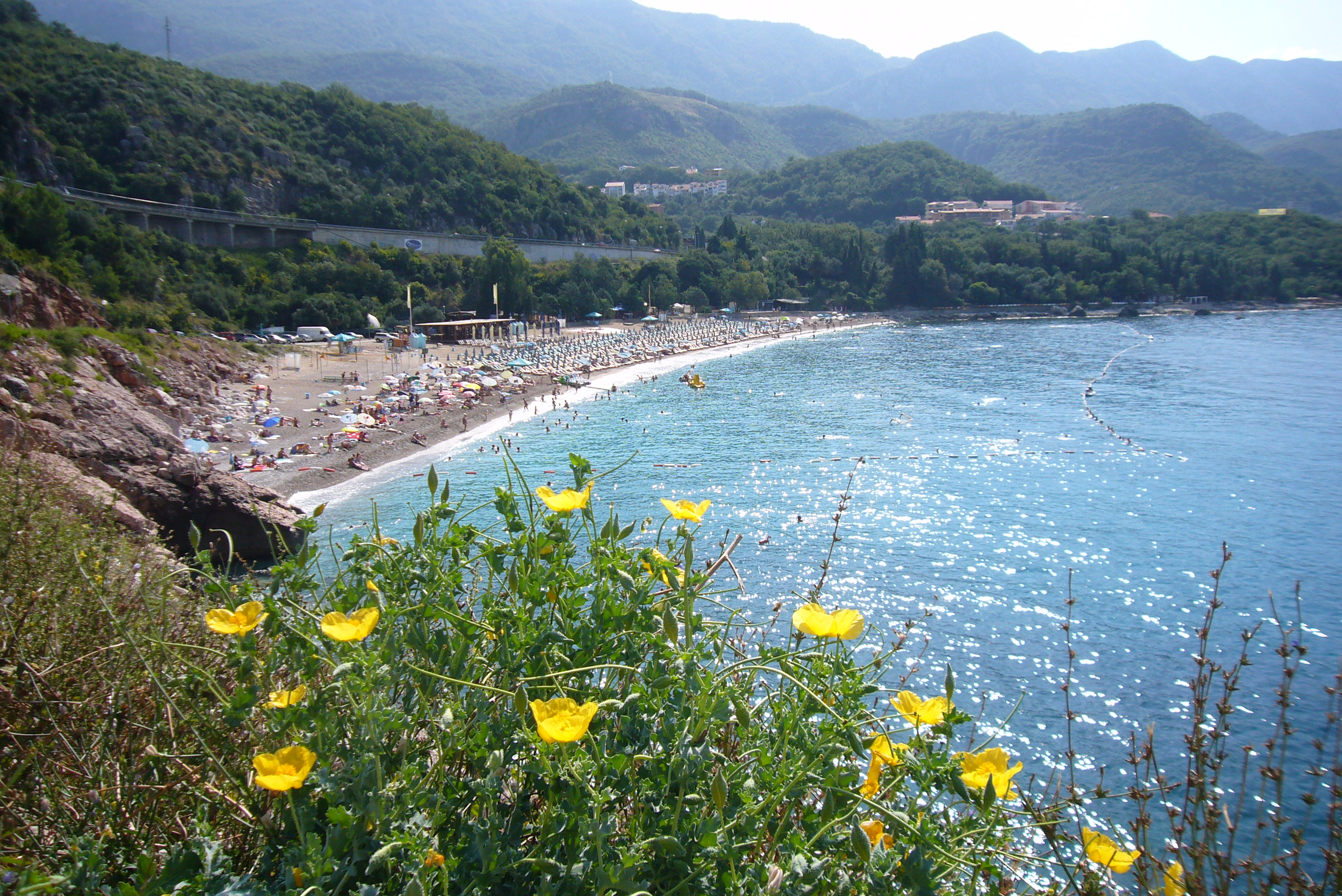
Kamenovo

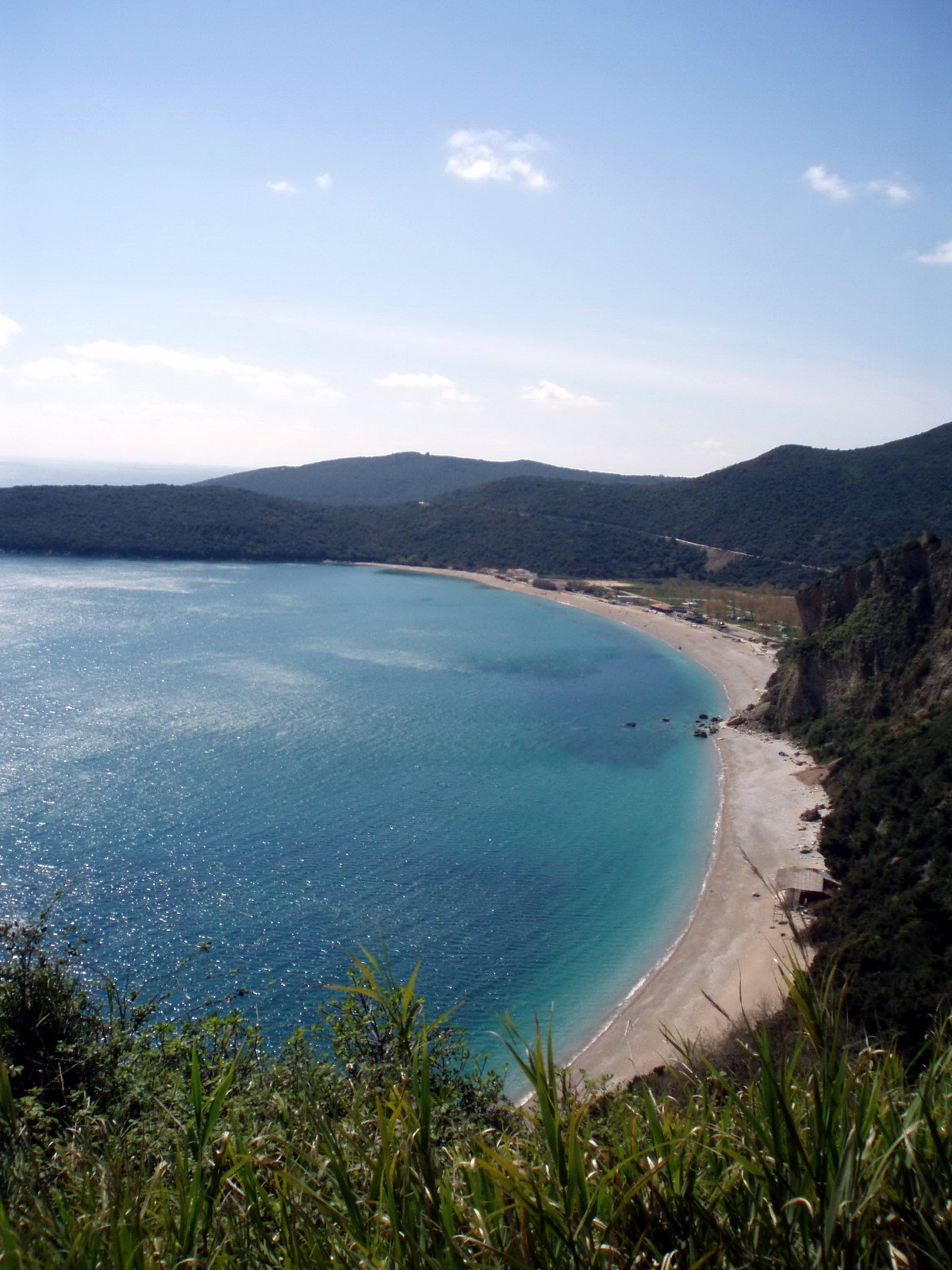
Jaz

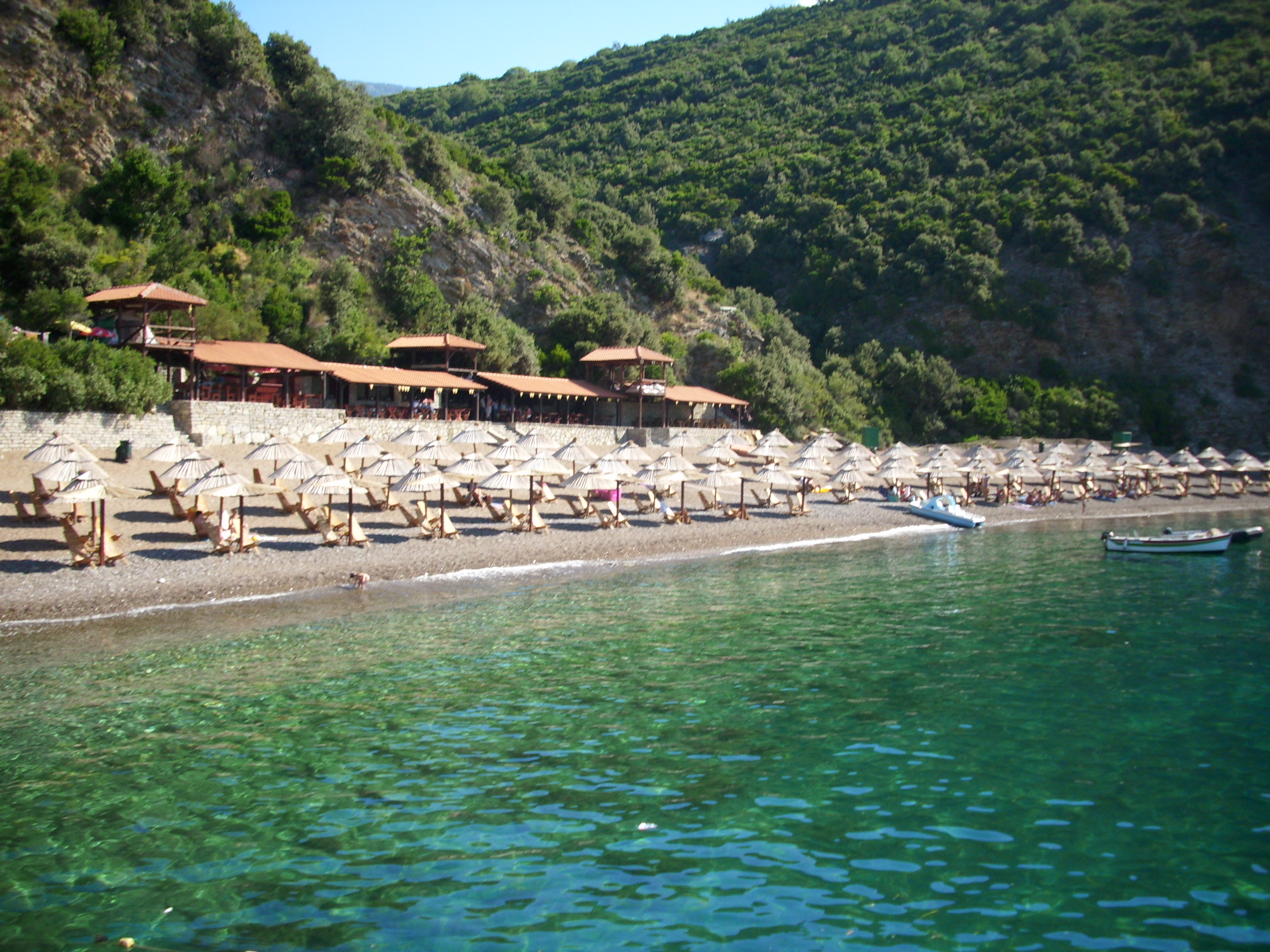
Čanj

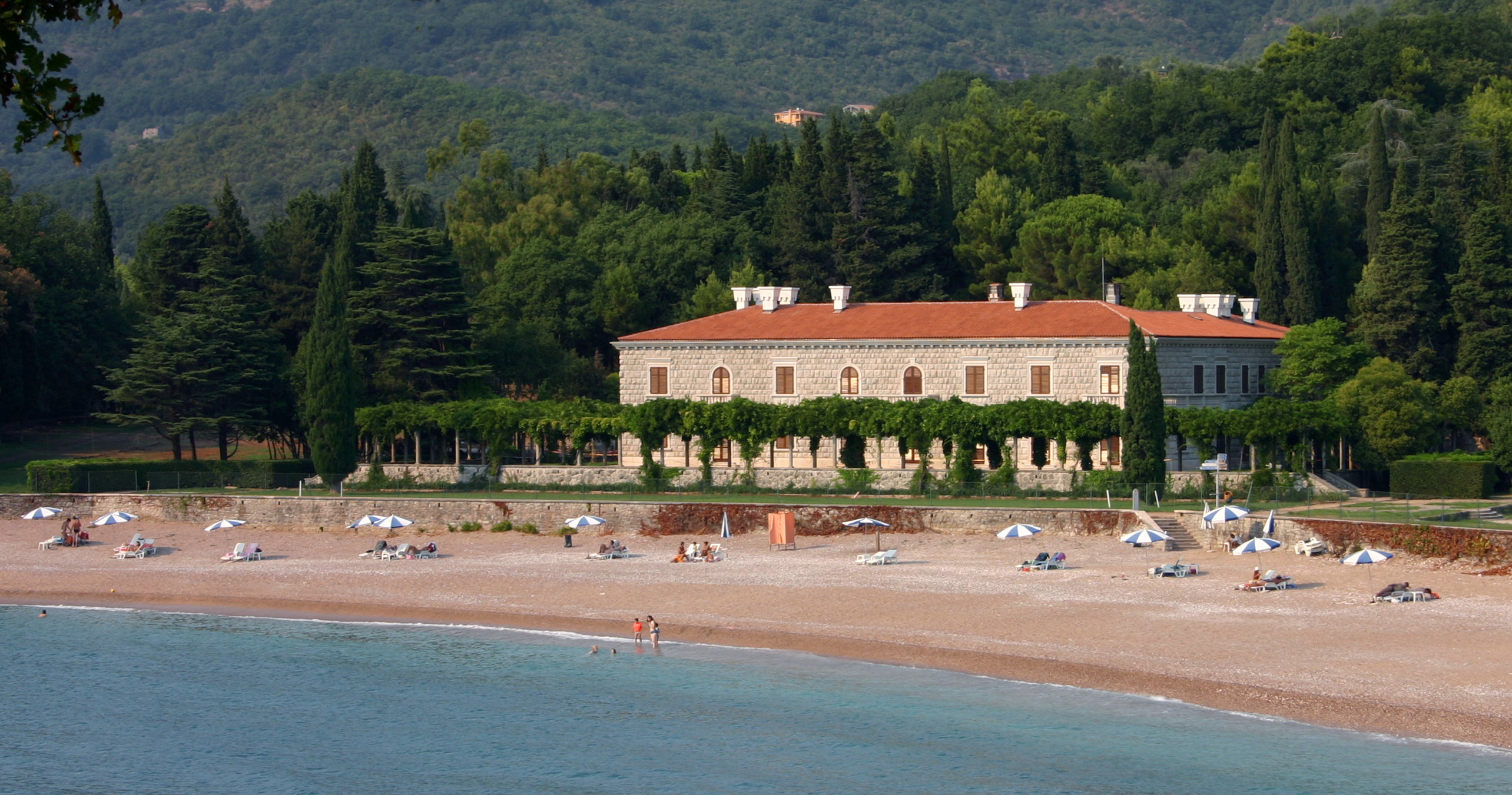
Miločer

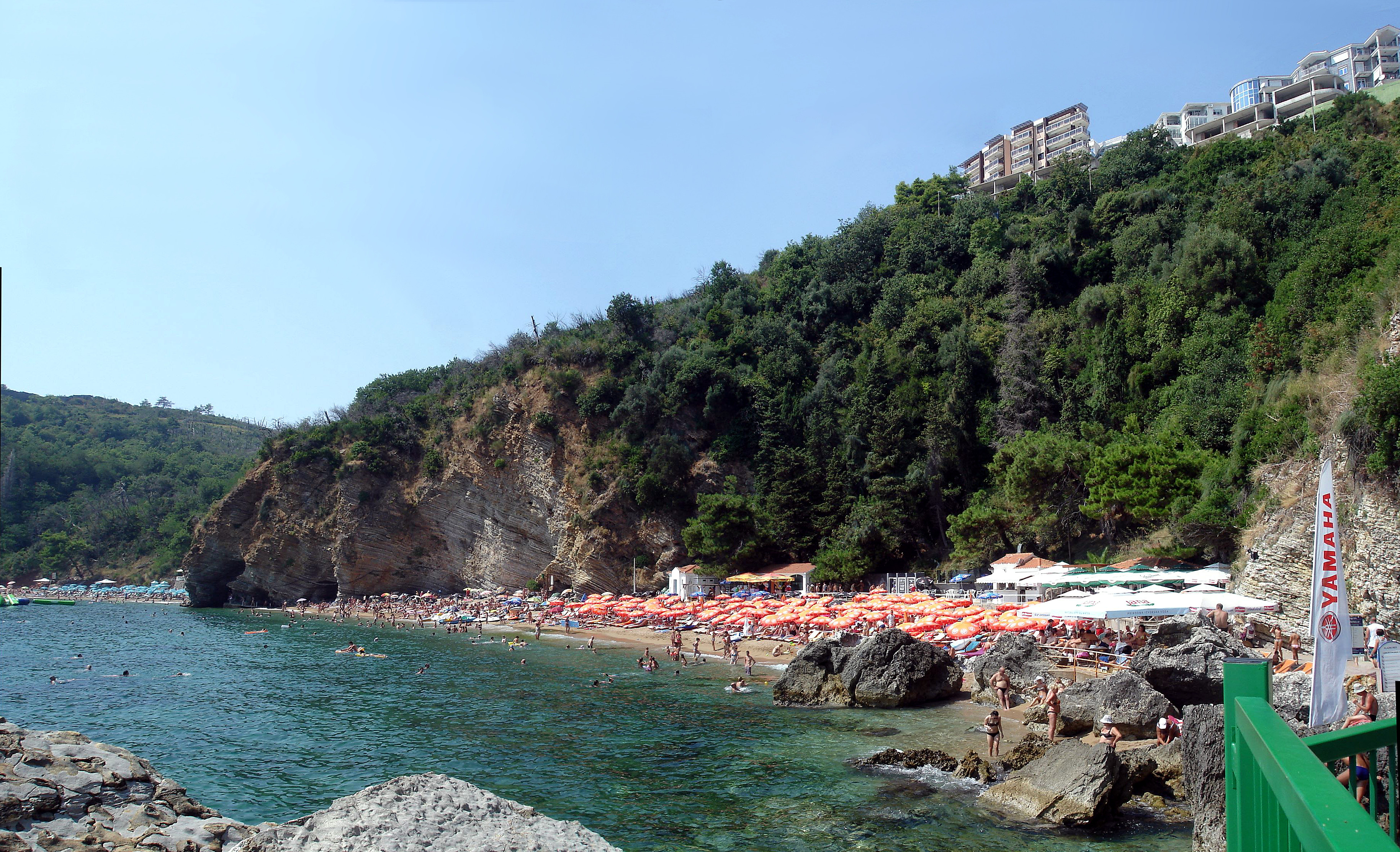
Mogren

=== Infrastructure ===
Coastal region has an international airport Tivat Airport.

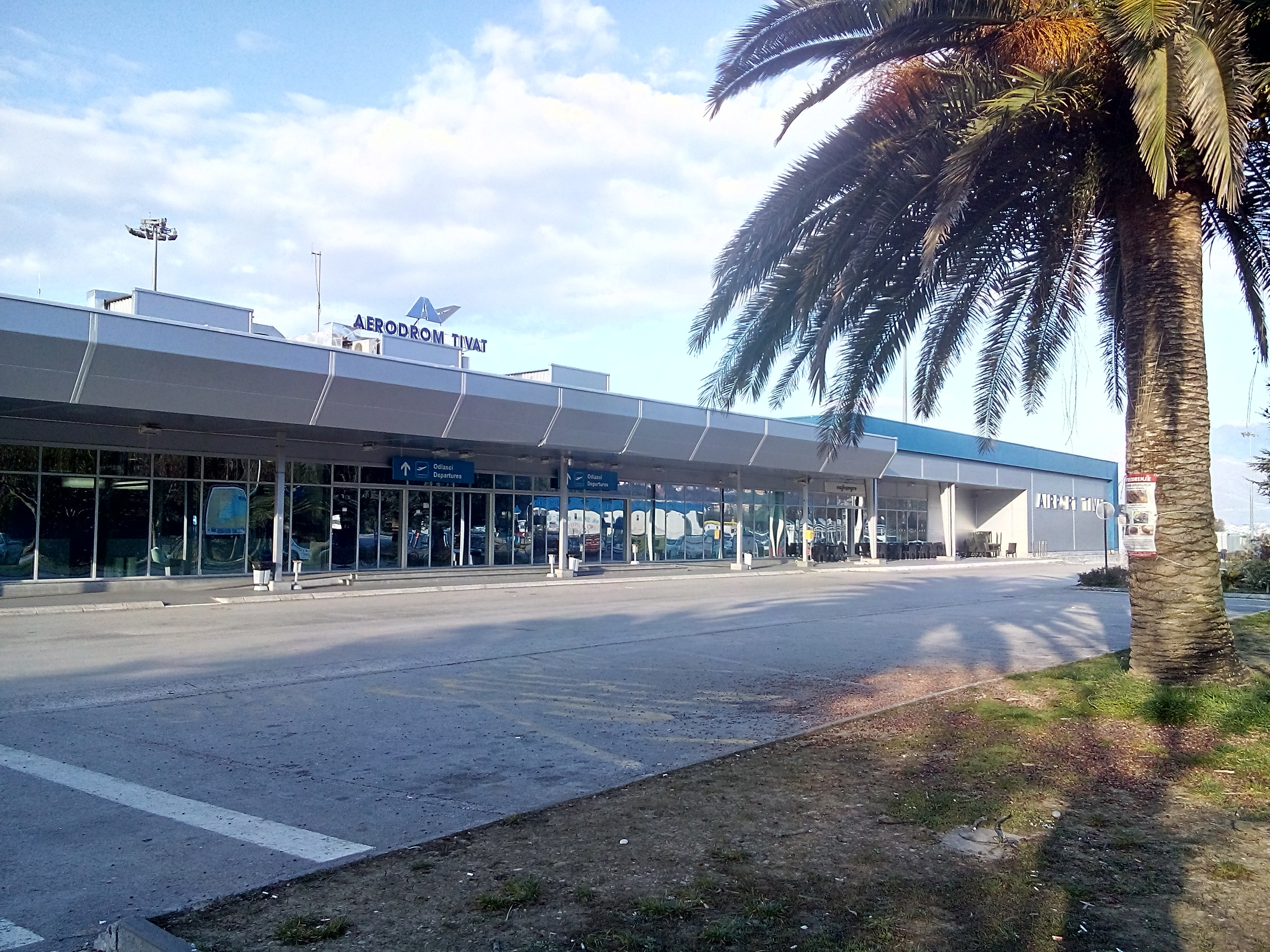
Tivat airport

The Port of Bar is Montenegro's main seaport. Initially built in 1906, the port was almost completely destroyed during World War II. Reconstruction began in 1950. It is equipped to handle over five million tons of cargo annually, but has been operating at a loss and well below capacity. The reconstruction of the Belgrade-Bar railway and the planned A-1 motorway are expected to return operating levels to capacity. Kotor, Risan, Tivat and Zelenika (in Bay of Kotor) have smaller ports.

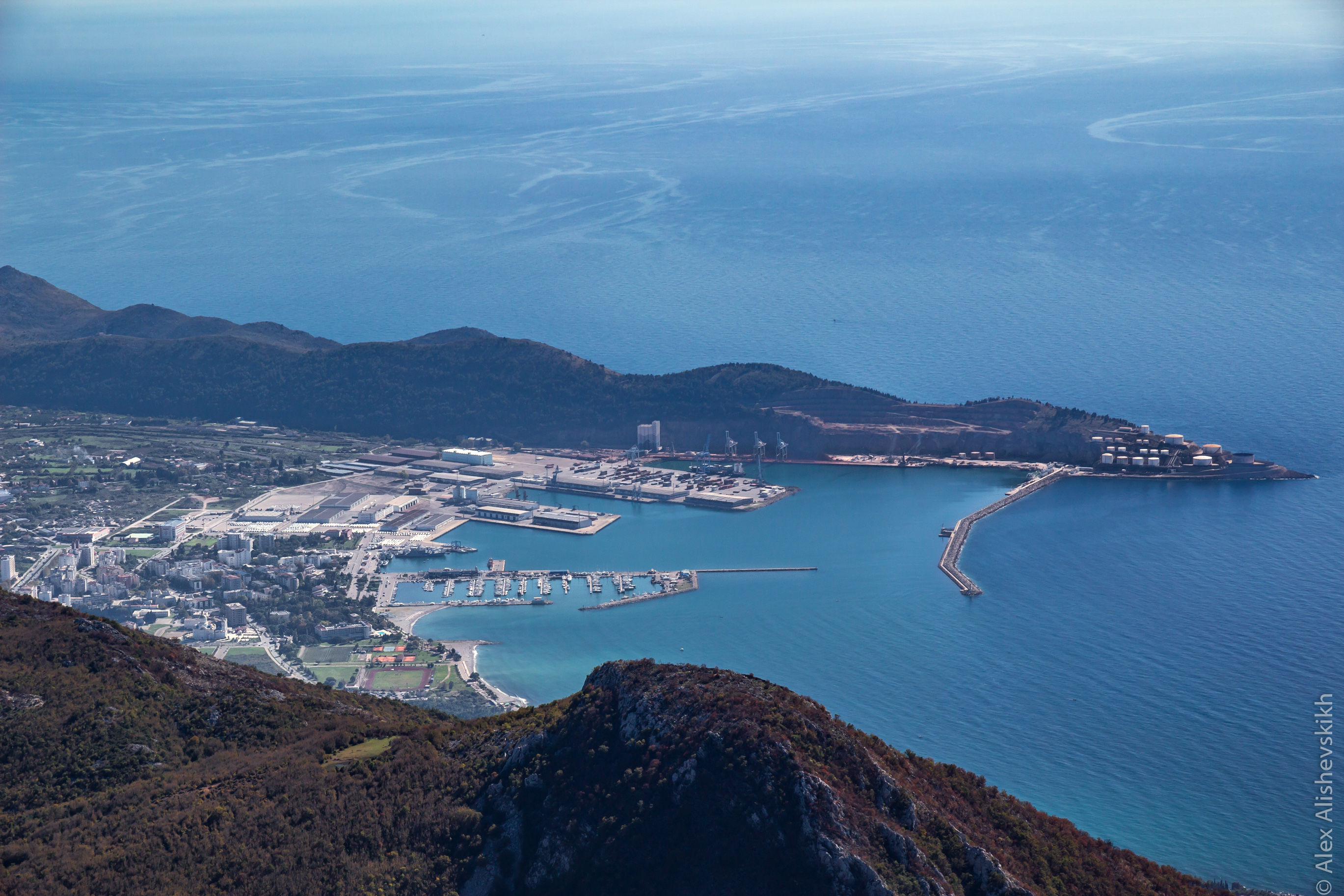
Port of Bar

In 2023 there is a plan to install an LNG terminal at Bar to receive gas imports.

== Demographics ==
The coastal region in the 2023 census has a population of 163,672. The Coastal region of Montenegro is primarily urban. The largest town by population is Bar.

The 2023 census in the Coastal region of Montenegro revealed a diverse ethnic composition. The largest ethnic group were Montenegrins, comprising 34.62% of the population. Serbs were the second largest group, making up 31.37%. Other significant ethnic groups included Albanians at 10.59%, Russians at 6.12%, Bosniaks at 3.15%, Croats at 2.56%, and Ukrainians at 1.57%. Since the war began in Ukraine, a significant number of Ukrainians, Russians, and Belarusians have also relocated to the coastal region of Montenegro.

Following municipalities make up the region:

Municipality	Area		Population	
Municipality	km^{2}	Rank	Total	Rank
Bar	598	1	45,812	1
Budva	122	5	27,445	3
Herceg Novi	235	4	30,824	2
Kotor	335	2	22,746	4
Tivat	46	6	16,338	6
Ulcinj	255	3	20,507	5

=== Religion ===
Majority of the population is identifying as Orthodox Christian, but also a significant portion are Muslims and Catholics.

Religion in Coastal Montenegro (2011)
1. Eastern Orthodoxy (63.9%)
2. Islam (19.3%)
3. Roman Catholicism (8.21%)
4. Irreligion (1.18%)
5. Undeclared (6.11%)
6. Other religions (1.27%)

== See also ==
- Montenegro
- Northern Montenegro
- Statistical regions of Montenegro
- Municipalities of Montenegro
- Geography of Montenegro
