= List of beaches in Montenegro =

This is a list of beaches in Montenegro.

- Ada Bojana, Ulcinj
- Bečići, Budva

- Crvena Zvezda Beach, Budva

- Buljarica, Budva
- Crvena Plaža, Bar
- Drobni Pijesak, Budva
- Gradska Plaža, Bar
- Jaz Beach, Budva
- Kamenovo, Budva
- Kraljičina Plaža, Budva
- Ladies Beach
- Liman, Ulcinj
- Liman II, Ulcinj
- Mala Plaža, Ulcinj
- Mendra, Ulcinj
- Miločer, Budva
- Mogren, Budva
- Petrovac
- Ploče, Budva
- Ponta Nuradinit, Ulcinj
- Pržno, Budva
- Slovenska Plaza, Budva
- Sutomore, Bar
- Sveti Stefan, Budva
- Trsteno, Budva
- Valdanos, Ulcin]
- Velika Plaža, Ulcinj
- Žukotrlica, Bar

== Ulcinj ==
This is a list of beaches in Ulcinj.

Key:

– Indicates a Blue Flag beach
– Indicates a camping area

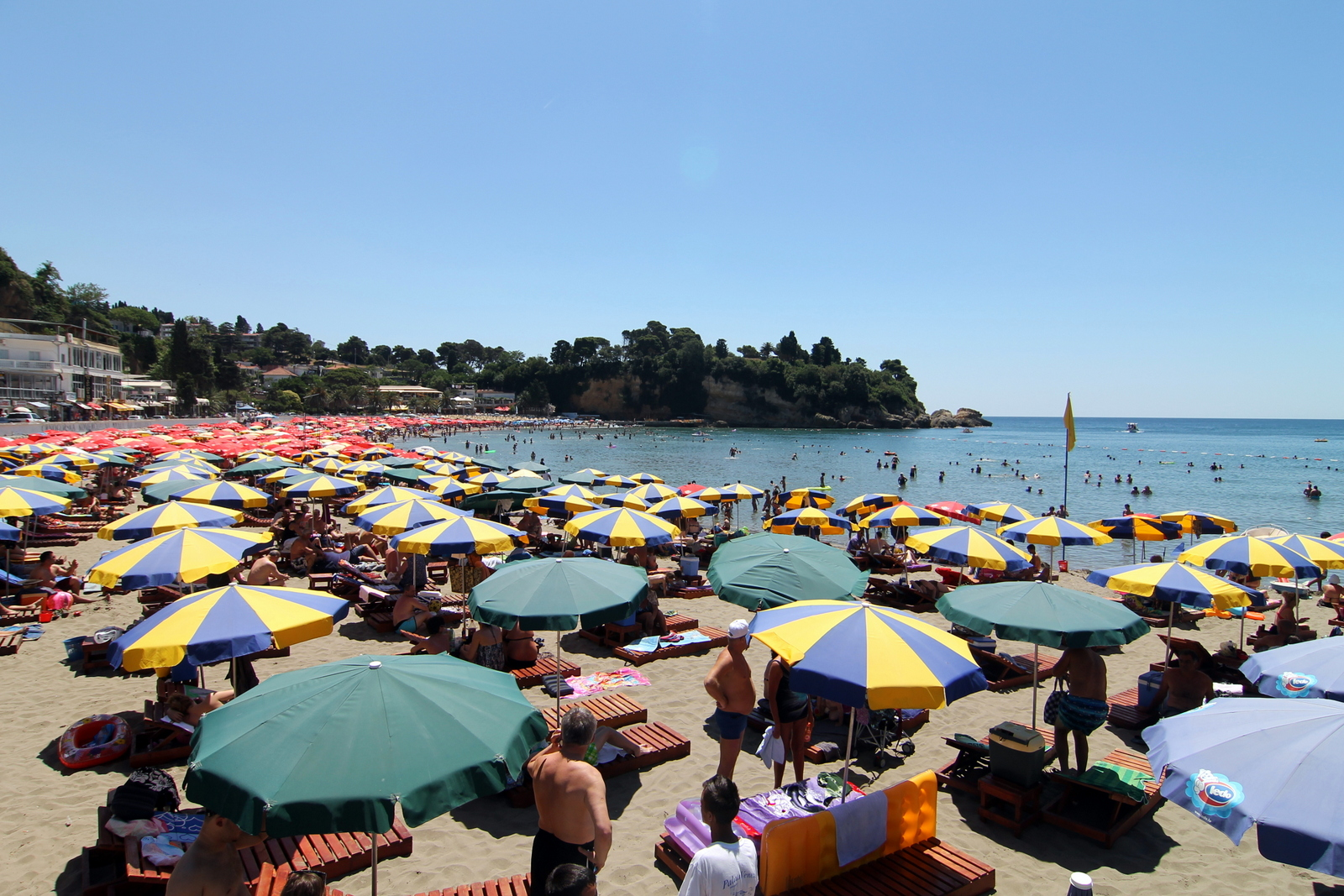
Mala Plaža

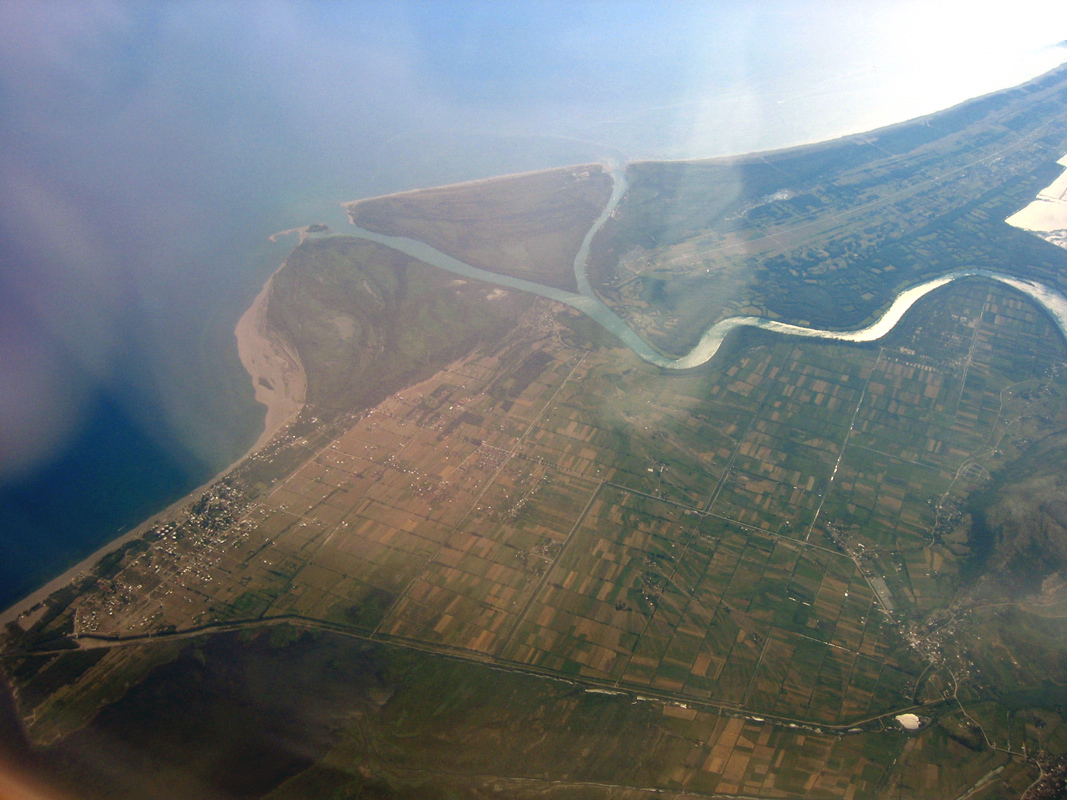
Ada Bojana

- Kruče
- Valdanos
- Opaljika
- Mendra
- Liman II
- Liman I
- Italijanska Beach
- Nuradinova Ponta
- Mala Plaža
- Beach "Aquarius"
- Beach "Ibiza"
- Beach "Sapore di Mare"
- Ladies Beach
- Beach "Albatros"
- Velika Plaža
  - Beach "Miami"
  - Beach "Copacabana"
  - Beach "Evropa"
  - Beach "MCM"
  - Beach "Safari"
  - Beach "Tropicana"
  - Beach "Saranda"
  - Beach "Tampico"
  - Beach "Adriatica"
  - Beach "Toni Grill"
  - Beach "Mojito"
  - Beach "White"
  - Beach "Lux"
  - Beach "Coco"
  - Beach "Kite Surf Dulcigno"
- Ada Bojana

== See also ==
- List of beaches
