= Valdanos =

Beach in Montenegro

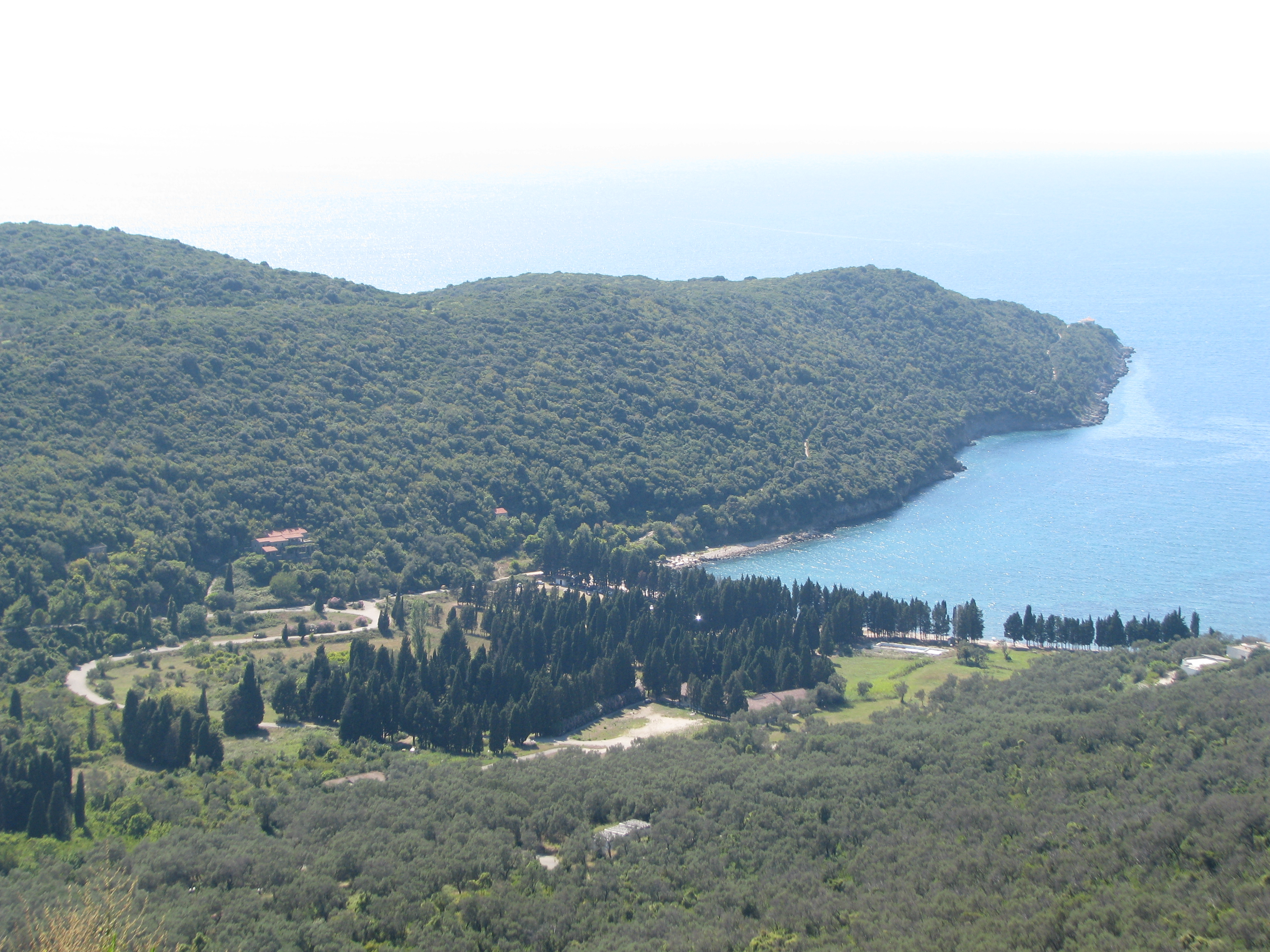
Valdanos Inlet

Valdanos (Serbian Cyrillic: Валданос; Albanian: Valdanosi) is a beach and major olive production region in Ulcinj Municipality, Montenegro. Valdanos Bay is one of many beaches in Montenegro's South Coast well-known to Montenegrins and visitors, which also include the nearby Ulcinj beaches at Velika Plaža, Ada Bojana, and Ladies Beach.

Valdanos beach is crescent-shaped, known for its round pebble shoreline that extends for 300 metres. The beach is part of a coastline at Valdanos that extends for approximately three kilometres.

The olive groves at Valdanos are among Montenegro's largest and most productive, encompassing more than 400,000 square metres and an estimated 18,000 olive trees .

== Development ==
In recent years, Valdanos has been presented to the international resort development industry as a major new destination development opportunity, available under a long-term lease with the Republic of Montenegro . Valdanos was at one time the location of a government military reservation.

=== Other Montenegro beaches ===
- Velika Plaža (Ulcinj)
- Ada Bojana (Ulcinj)
- Ladies Beach (Ulcinj)
- Buljarica
- Jaz Beach
