= Lepismachilis alexandrae =

Scientific classification
- Kingdom: Animalia
- Phylum: Arthropoda
- Clade: Pancrustacea
- Class: Insecta
- Order: Archaeognatha
- Family: Machilidae
- Genus: Lepismachilis
- Species: L. alexandrae

Binomial name
- Lepismachilis alexandrae Kaplin, 2018
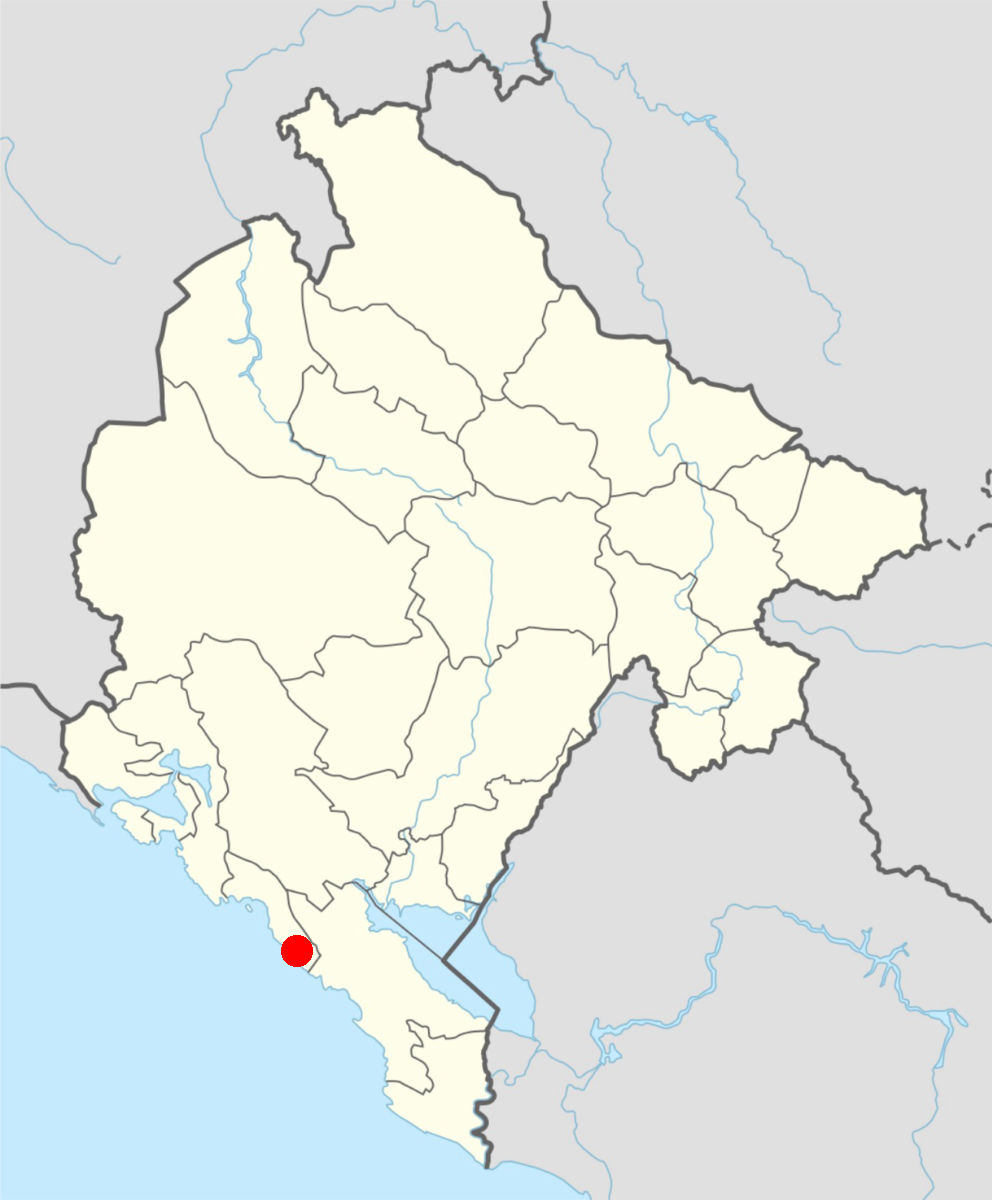

Species of wingless insects

Lepismachilis alexandrae is a species of jumping bristletails in the family Machilidae.

== Distribution ==
This species is endemic to Montenegro and is known only from its holotype, which was collected near Petrovac in the Budva Municipality. The specimen was found under a stone in a pine forest.
