= Ladies Beach, Ulcinj =

Beach in Ulcinj, Montenegro

Coordinates: 41.91992°N 19.21352°E

Ladies Beach (Serbian: Женска Плажа, romanized: Ženska Plaža; Albanian: Plazhi i Grave) is a beach in Ulcinj, Montenegro. The waters by the beach contain high levels of sulphur, resulting in a deep green color. According to legend, the sulphur-rich water is a natural remedy for infertility. The beach is open exclusively to women.

== See also ==
- Velika Plaža (Ulcinj)
- Ada Bojana beach and river Ada (Ulcinj)
- Buljarica
- Jaz Beach
