= Pržno =

Pržno may refer to places:

== Czech Republic ==
- Pržno (Frýdek-Místek District), a municipality and village in the Moravian-Silesian Region
- Pržno (Vsetín District) a municipality and village in the Zlín Region

== Montenegro ==
- Pržno, Budva, a village
- Pržno, an inlet in Tivat Municipality
