= Lepismachilis gimnesiana =

Scientific classification
- Kingdom: Animalia
- Phylum: Arthropoda
- Clade: Pancrustacea
- Class: Insecta
- Order: Archaeognatha
- Family: Machilidae
- Genus: Lepismachilis
- Species: L. gimnesiana

Binomial name
- Lepismachilis gimnesiana Mendes, 1981

Species of archaeognatha

Lepismachilis gimnesiana is a species in the genus Lepismachilis of the family Machilidae which belongs to the insect order Archaeognatha (jumping bristletails).
