= Budva Municipality =

Budva Municipality Opština Budva Општина Будва
- Municipality
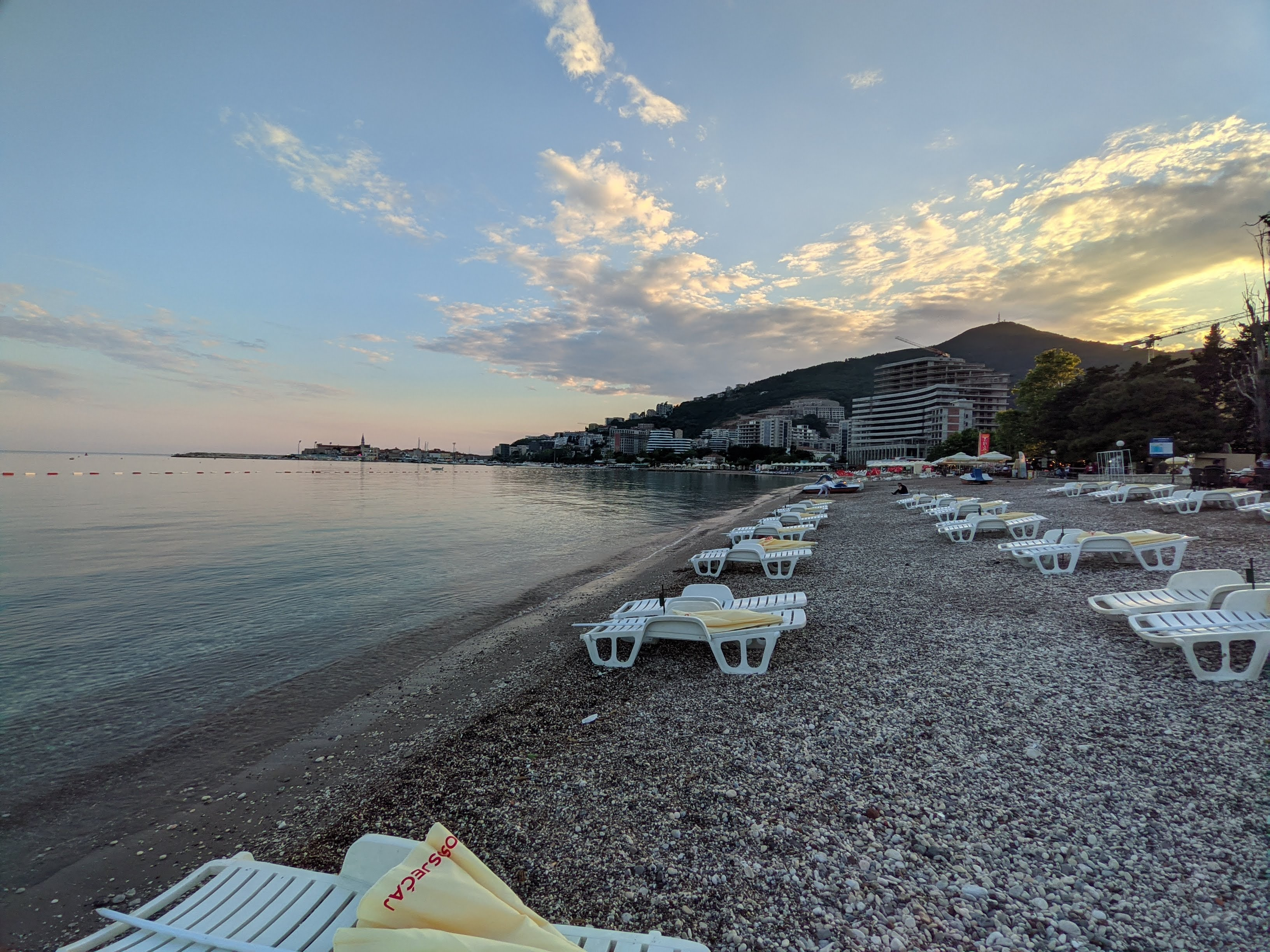
- Beach in Budva

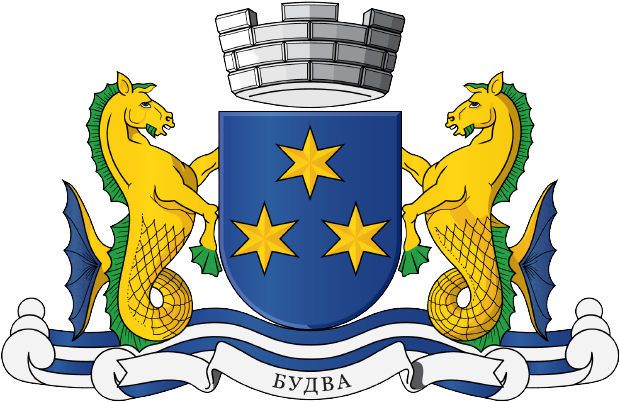
- Coat of arms

- Budva Municipality in Montenegro
- Country: Montenegro
- Seat: Budva

Area
  - Total: 122 km^{2} (47 sq mi)

Population (2023)
  - Total: 27,445
  - Density: 225/km^{2} (583/sq mi)
- Time zone: UTC+1 (CET)
  - Summer (DST): UTC+2 (CEST)
- Postal code: 85310
- Area code: +382 33
- ISO 3166-2 code: ME-05
- Car plates: BD
- Climate: Csa
- Website: budva.me

Budva Municipality (Montenegrin: Opština Budva / Општина Будва) is a municipality of Montenegro. The administrative center is the town of Budva. The municipality is located at the Adriatic coast in southwestern Montenegro. With a population of 27,445, it is the 6th most populous out of the country's 25 municipalities.

== Geography ==
The Budva municipality is located on the Budva Riviera region, a 35 km (22 mi) long strip of the Adriatic coast surrounding the town of Budva in southwestern Montenegro. It is part of the Montenegrin Littoral geographical region. It is located roughly along the middle of the Montenegrin coast, and is a center for Montenegrin beach tourism. There are 12.5 km (7.8 mi) of beaches which lie along the Budva Riviera.

=== Settlements ===
The municipality has 33 settlements:

- Bečići
- Blizikuće
- Boreti
- Brajići
- Brda
- Budva
- Buljarica
- Čami Do
- Čelobrdo
- Čučuke
- Đenaši
- Drobnići
- Ilino Brdo
- Kaluđerac
- Katun Reževići
- Krstac
- Kuljače
- Lapčići
- Markovići
- Novoselje
- Petrovac
- Pobori
- Podbabac
- Podostrog
- Prijevor
- Pržno
- Rađenovići
- Rijeka Reževići
- Stanišići
- Sveti Stefan
- Tudorovići
- Viti Do
- Žukovica

== Government ==
The municipal parliament consists of 33 deputies elected directly for a four-year term. The Mayor of Budva is the head of the town and Municipality of Budva. He acts on behalf of the Town, and performs an executive function in the Municipality of Budva.

=== City Assembly (2024–2028) ===
Party/Coalition	Seats	Local government
BND	9 / 33	Government
DPS	7 / 33	Government
ZBCG (NSD–DNP)	6 / 33	Opposition
DCG	2 / 33	Opposition
SDP	2 / 33	Government
PzG	2 / 33	Opposition
SNP	2 / 33	Opposition
PES	1 / 33	Opposition
URA	1 / 33	Government
NB	1 / 33	Opposition

== Demographics ==
Historical population
Year	Pop.	±% p.a.
1948	3,825	—
1953	4,364	+2.67%
1961	4,834	+1.29%
1971	6,106	+2.36%
1981	8,632	+3.52%
1991	11,547	+2.95%
2003	15,909	+2.71%
2011	19,218	+2.39%
2023	27,445	+3.01%
Source: MONSTAT

The town of Budva is the administrative centre of the municipality, which also includes the neighbouring towns of Bečići and Petrovac. According to the 2023 census, the municipality of Budva had a population of 27,445.

Ethnicity in 2023:

- 9,822 Serbs (35.79%)
- 9,774 Montenegrins (35.61%)
- 3,738 Russians (13.62%)
- 1,029 Ukrainians (3.75%)
- 345 Turks (1.26%)
- 224 Belarusians (0.82%)
- 144 Croats (0.52%)
- 2,369 Others (8.63%)

Religion in 2023:

- 23,124 - Orthodox (84.26%)
- 1,124 - Muslims (4.10%)
- 446 - Catholics (1.63%)
- 369 - Other Christians (1.34%)
- 238 - Others (0.87%)
- 1,324 - Atheists (4.82%)
- 820 - Undeclared (2.99%)

== Tourism ==
Tourism is the main driver of the economy of Budva. It is a significant tourist destination on the eastern Adriatic, and by far the most popular destination in Montenegro. In 2013, Budva recorded 668,931 tourist visits, and 4,468,913 overnight stays, thus accounting for 44.8% of tourist visits to Montenegro, and 47.5% of its overnight stays. The best known and most popular settlements along the Budva municipality are the municipal seat Budva, Bečići, Rafailovići, Sveti Stefan and Petrovac.

== Gallery ==
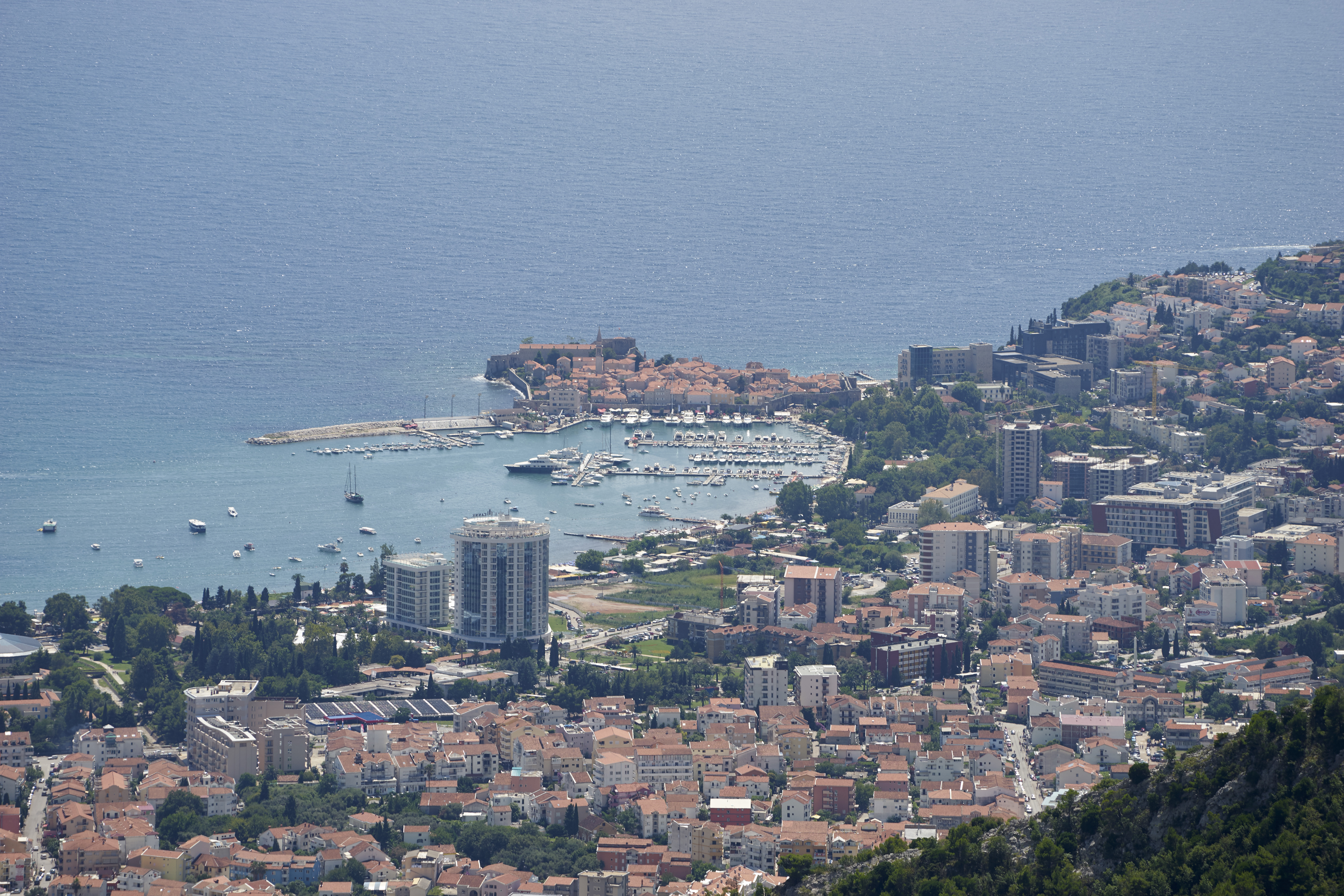
Town of Budva

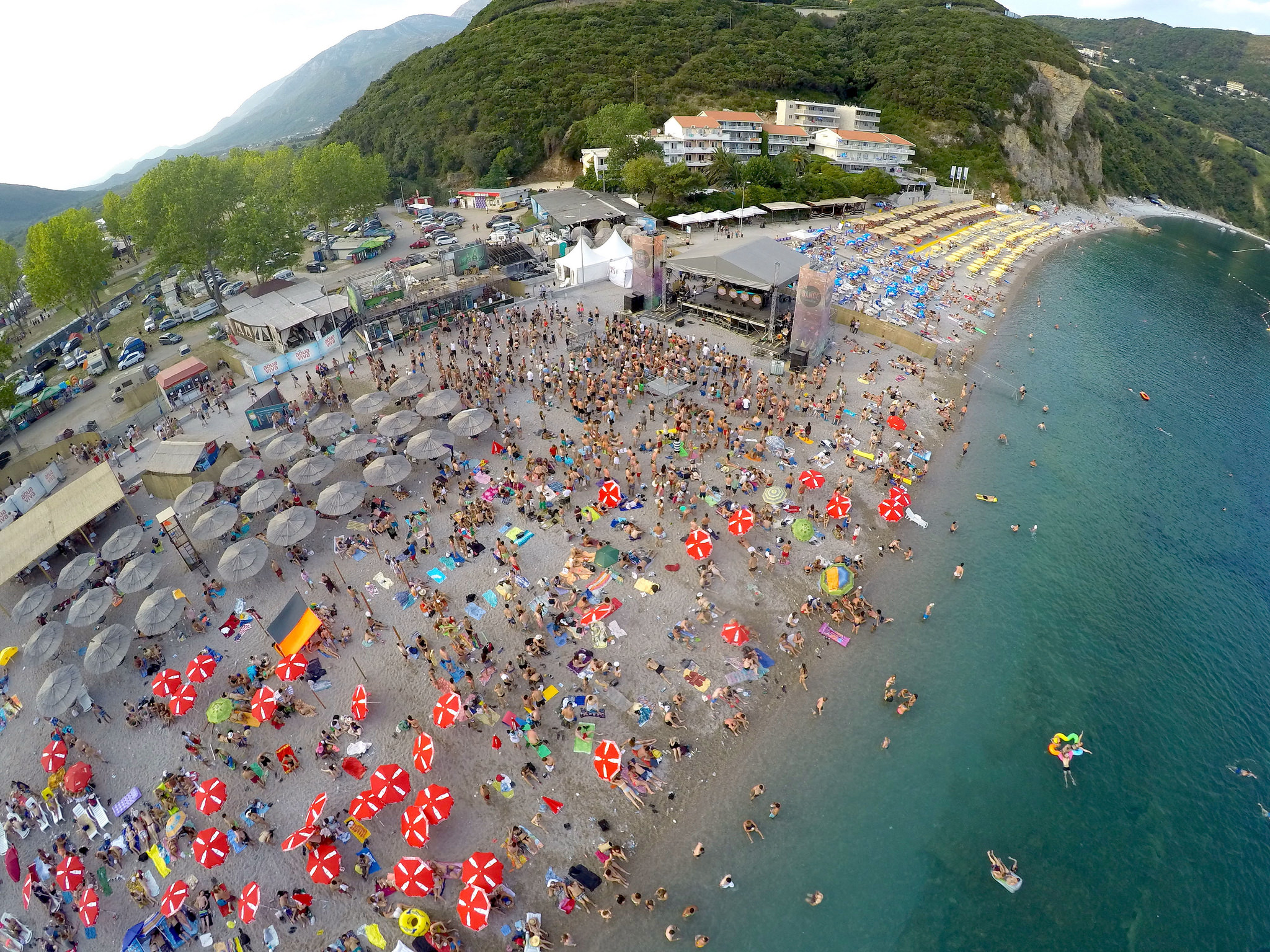
Jaz beach

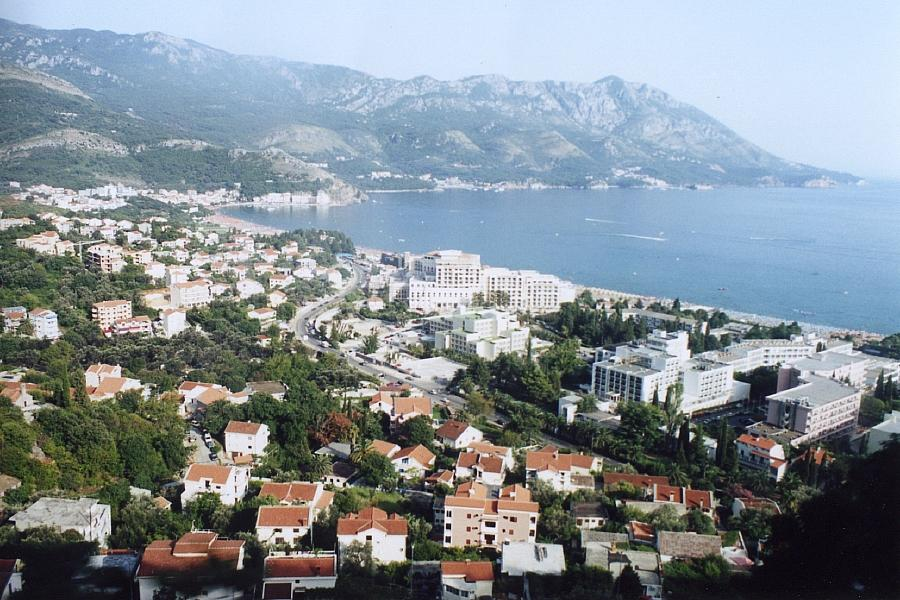
Town of Bečići

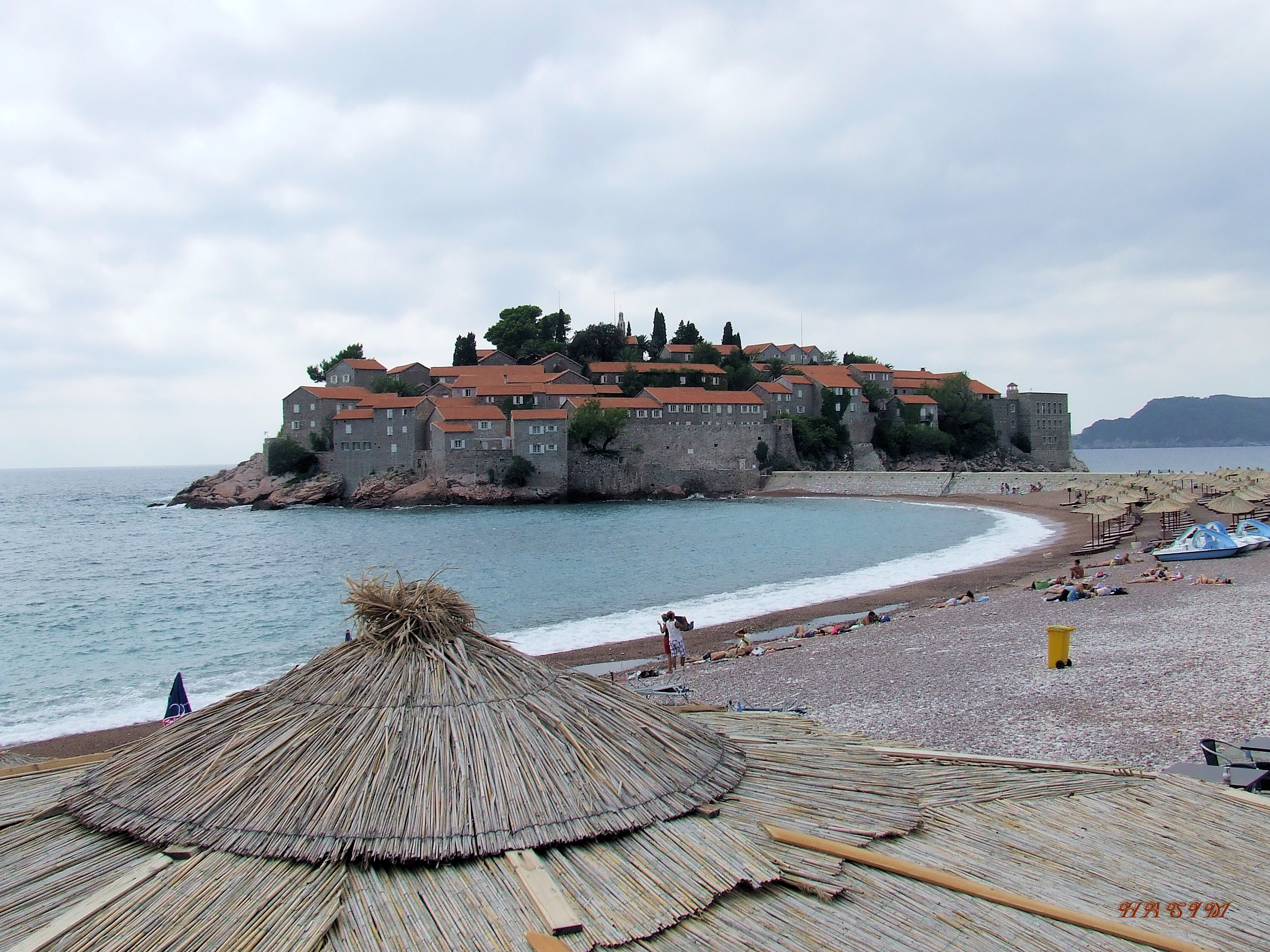
Sveti Stefan

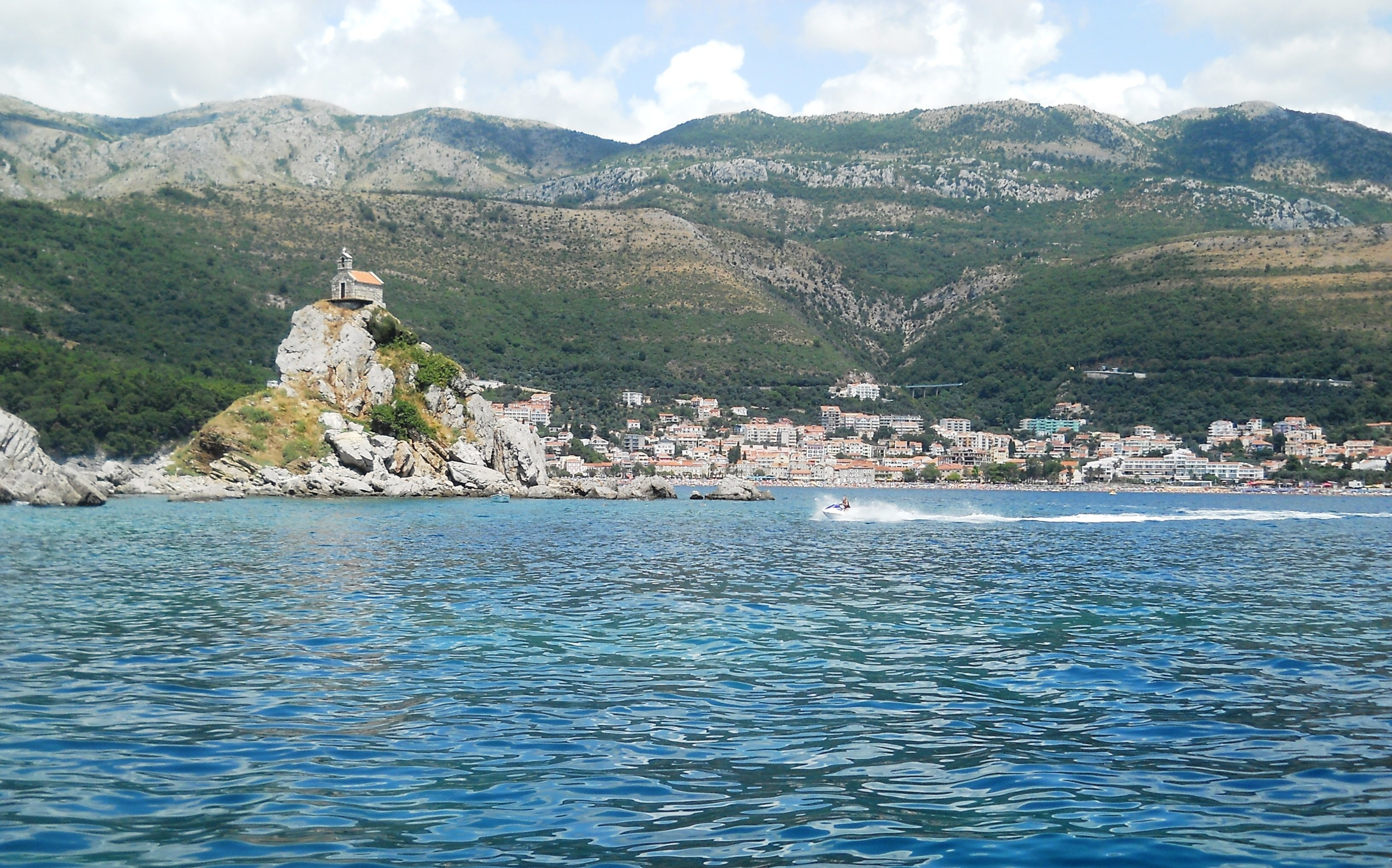
Town of Petrovac

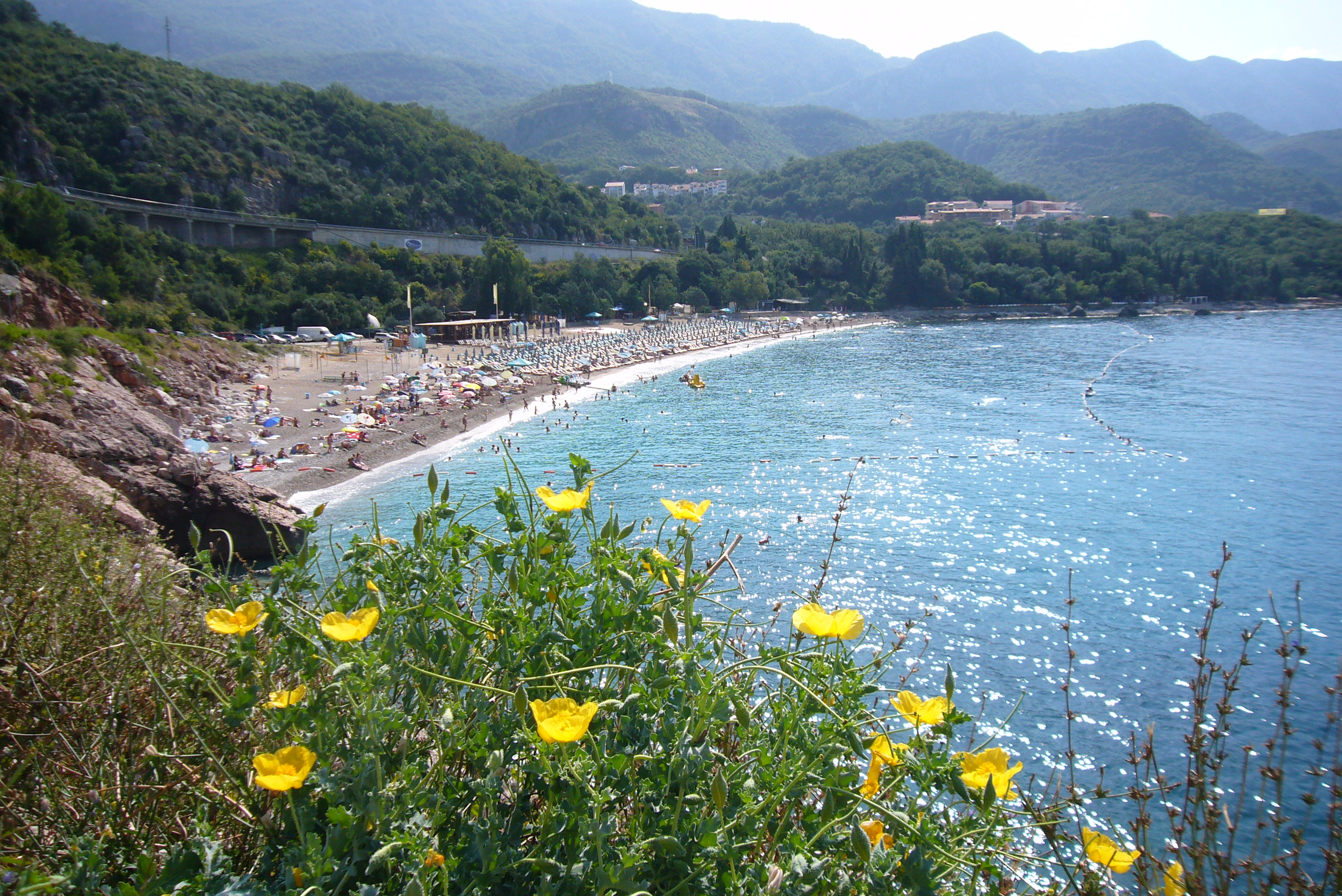
Kamenovo beach

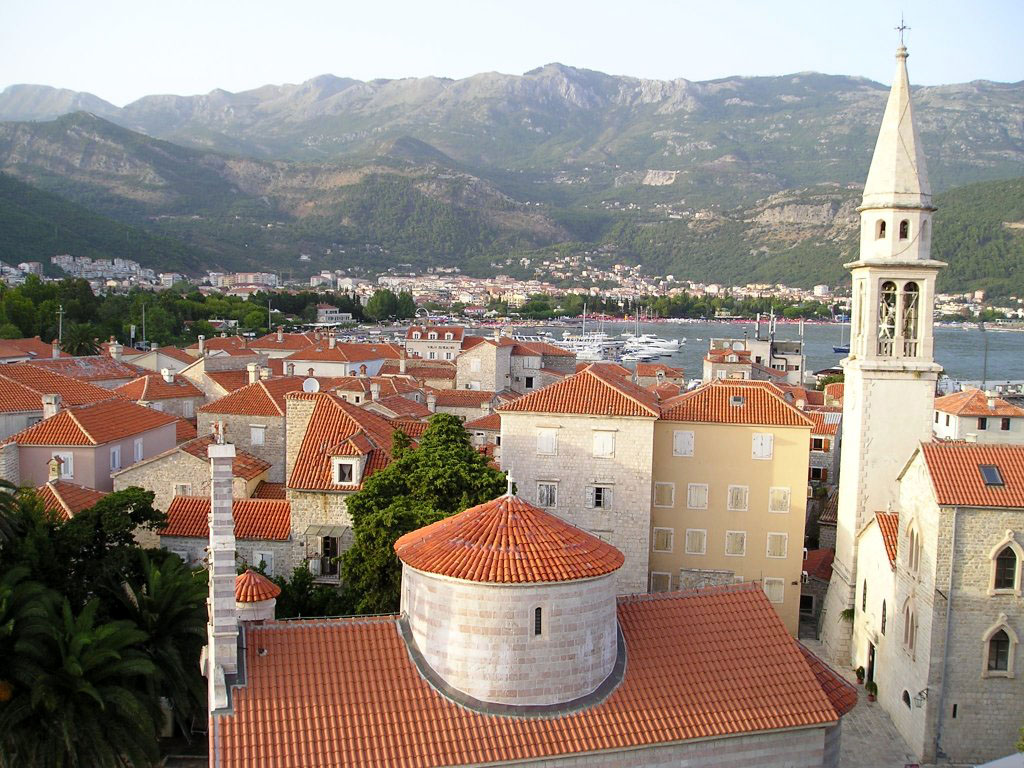
Old Town of Budva

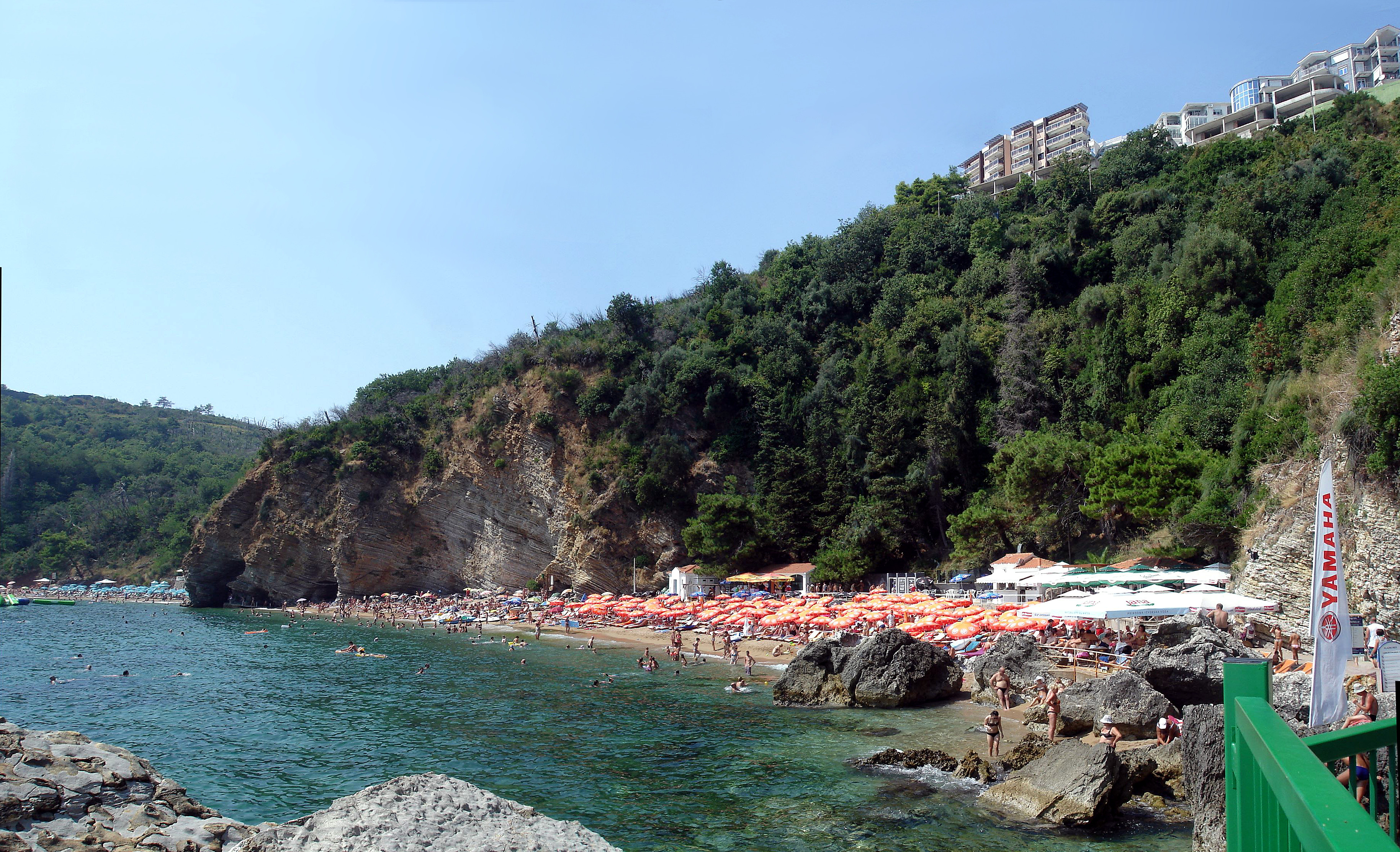
Mogren beach
