= Buna (Adriatic Sea) =

River in Albania and Montenegro

Buna Bojana
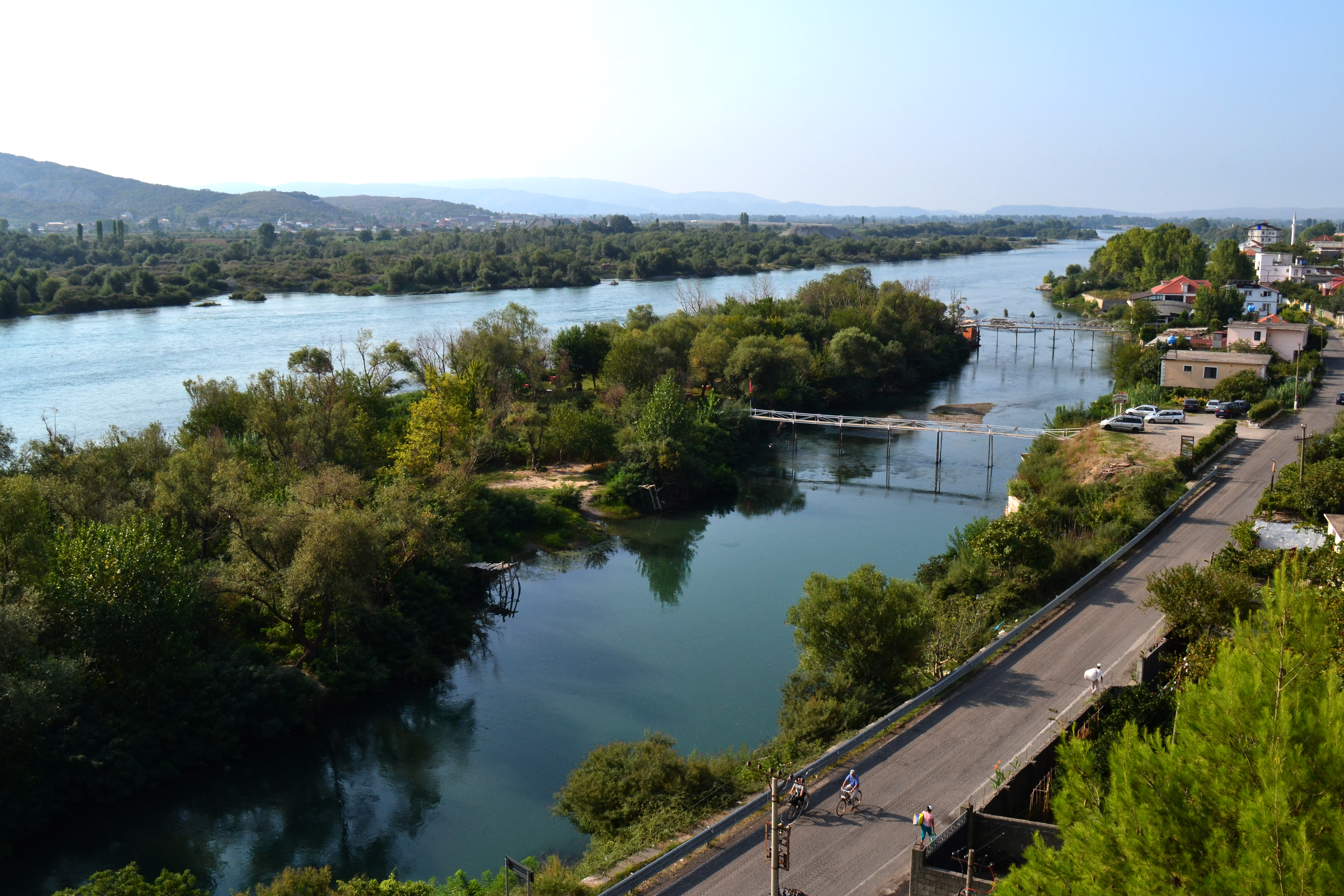
- Buna River near Shkodër
- Native name: Bunë (Albanian); Бојана (Montenegrin)

Location
- Countries: Albania and Montenegro
- County: Shkodër (Albania)
- Municipality: Shkodër (Albania); Ulcinj (Montenegro)
- City: Shkodër (Albania)

Physical characteristics
- Source: Lake Skadar
- Mouth: Adriatic Sea
  - coordinates: 41°50′50″N 19°22′18″E
- Length: 41 km (25 mi)
- Basin size: 19,582 km^{2} (7,561 sq mi)
- Discharge
  - average: 672 m^{3}/s (23,700 cu ft/s)

Basin features
- Tributaries
  - left: Great Drin
- Designation

Ramsar Wetland
- Official name: Lake Shkodra and River Buna
- Designated: 2 February 2006
- Reference no.: 1598

The Buna (Albanian indefinite form: Bunë) or Bojana (Montenegrin Cyrillic: Бојана), is a 41-kilometre-long (25 mi) river in Albania and Montenegro which flows into the Adriatic Sea. An outflow of Lake Skadar measured from the source of the lake's longest tributary, the Morača, the Morača-Shkodra Lake-Bojana system is 183 km (114 mi) long.

== Name ==
The modern Albanian name of the river is derived from Illyrian Barbanna and follows Albanian phonetic sound rules.

== History ==
The river appears as the Fiume Boiana in a 1688 map of the region, published by Vincenzo Coronelli. At the time, the river did not have any tributaries feeding into it. The presence of the Drin river having its own mouth into the Adriatic Sea on the map suggests that the Drin did not join the Buna river until after 1688. Over time, the frequent changes in its course and water levels led to flooding of its banks and the surrounding plains. Such occurrences led to the slow decay of the Monastery of Saints Sergius and Bacchus, located right on the bank of the Buna river.

== Course ==
The river used to be longer, but due to a rise in the level of Lake Skadar, the uppermost part of the river is now under the lake's surface. The river initially flows east, but after only few kilometers reaches the city of Shkodër and turns to the south. On the southern outskirts of the city, the river receives its most important tributary, the Great Drin, the greater part of which became its tributary after changing course during a flood in 1858 and now brings more water (352 m³/s) than the Buna itself (320 m³/s). After flowing around the Peak of Tarabosh, it passes through the villages of Zues, Bërdicë, Darragjat, Oblikë, Obot, Shirq, Dajç and Goricë.

After 20 kilometres (12 mi) in Albania, it forms the border between Albania and Montenegro. On this border section, which is 24 km (15 mi) long, the river meanders widely, flowing around the lakes Šas and Zogajsko blato, both in Montenegro. Settlements include villages of Sveti Đorđe and Reč on the Montenegrin, and Luarzë and Pulaj on the Albanian side. The area surrounding the river in this section is low and marshy, with the Buna river being the eastern border of the Field of Ulcinj and of the 12-kilometre-long (7.5 mi) Long Beach (Velika Plaža) of Ulcinj.

At its mouth into the Adriatic, Buna forms a small delta with two arms, the left one forming the border with Albania, and the right one, with the island between the arms, being part of Montenegro. The island is called Ada Bojana (Ada, the Turkish word for "island", has found its way into the Serbian language). It was supposedly formed around a ship's wreck in the 19th century, and now covers an area of 6 km^{2} (2.3 sq mi), and is Montenegro's largest island. With the neighboring resort of Sveti Nikola ("Saint Nicholas"), it is a major center of nudism along the Adriatic.

Another, smaller island belonged to Albania and was called Franc Jozeph Island or Ada Major. This small island was not artificial such as Ada Bojana but natural. The Island of Franz Joseph frequently received tourists, however, the island disappeared in recent years.

== Characteristics ==
The river has a large drainage basin of 5,187 km^{2} (2,003 sq mi). Lake Skadar, the largest lake in southeastern Europe, at almost sea level, nearby empties into it, draining much of Montenegro. From Albania, and border lands east, its main tributary is the Great Drin. Buna river ranks second among all tributaries to the Adriatic (measured by average annual discharge) after the Po in Italy. Its mean discharge is c. 1,540 m^{3}/s (54,000 cu ft/s).

It is highly navigable and is worked and toured by vessels ranging from motorboats, canal barges up to large tour boats and inland goods barges.

== Gallery ==
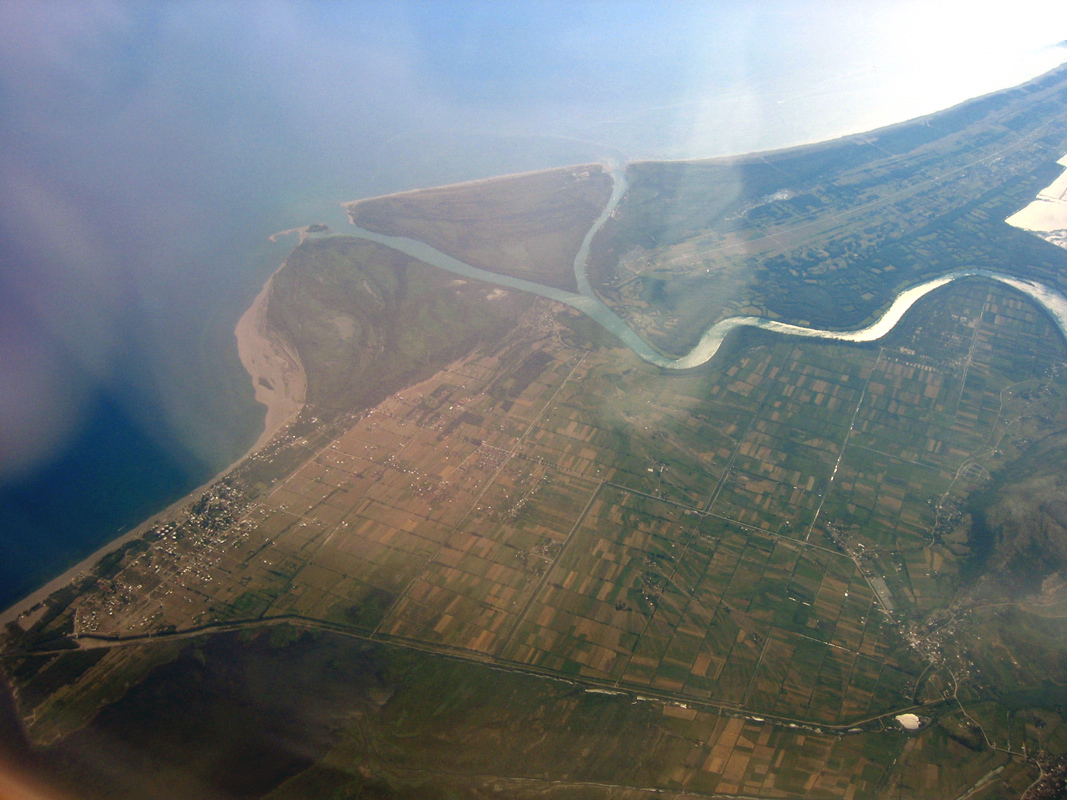
Aerial view the river's mouth, where it flows into the Adriatic

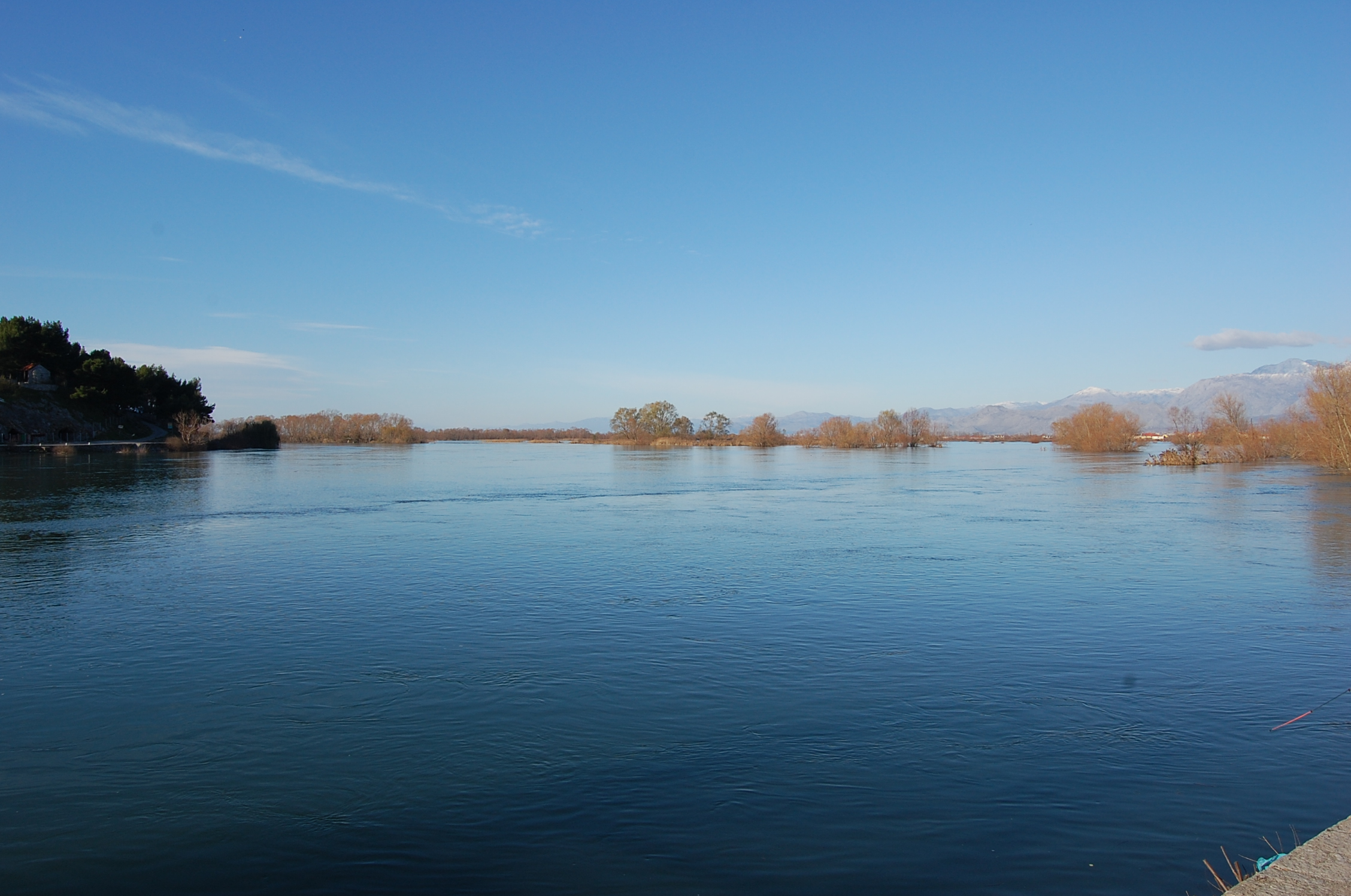
The Buna river in Shkodër, Albania

== Bibliography ==
- Mala Prosvetina Enciklopedija, Third edition, Prosveta, 1985, ISBN 86-07-00001-2
- Jovan Đ. Marković, Enciklopedijski geografski leksikon Jugoslavije, Svjetlost-Sarajevo, 1990, ISBN 86-01-02651-6
