= Boreti =

Boreti Борети
- Village
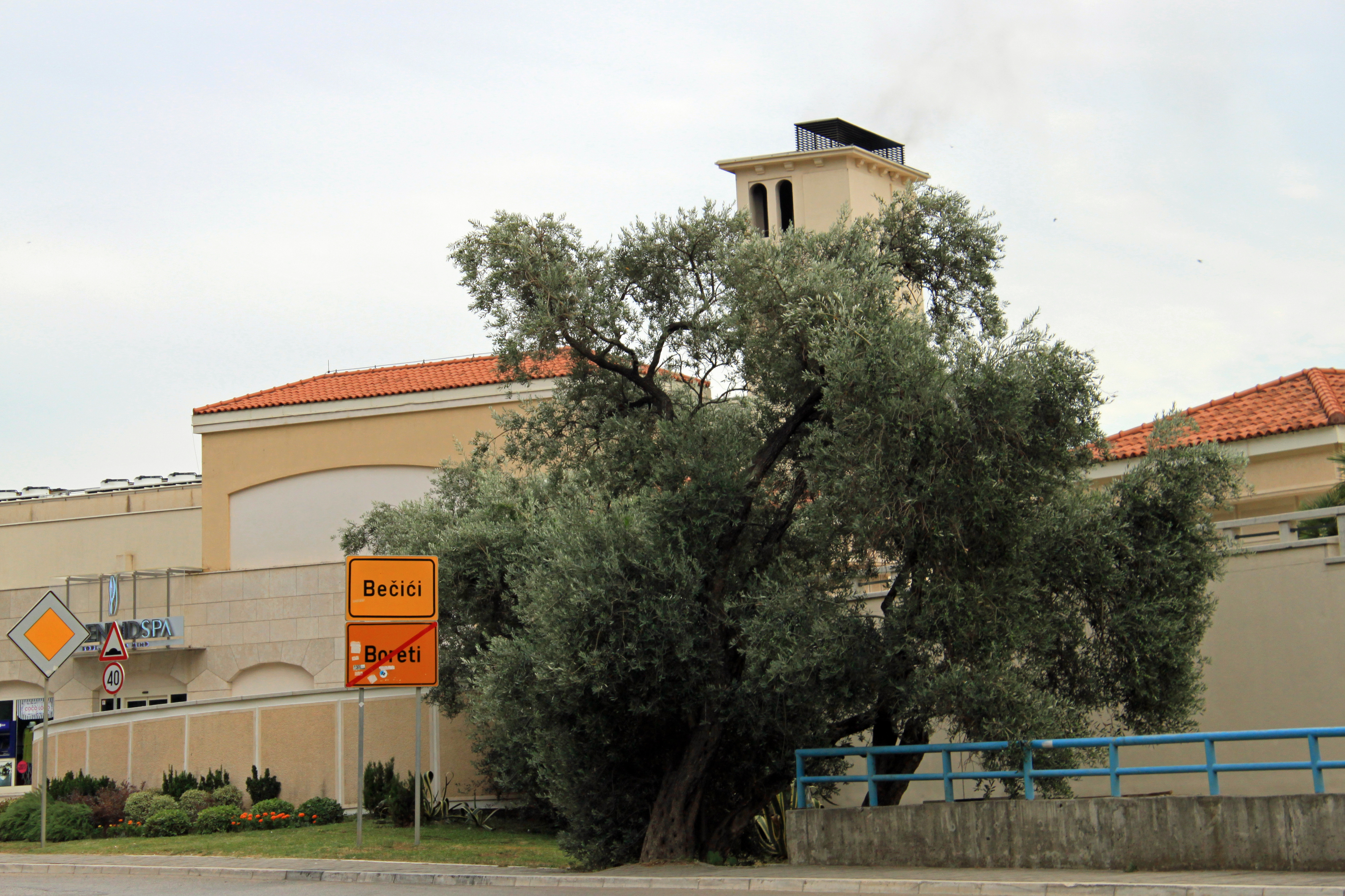

- Location within Montenegro
- Coordinates: 42.283701°N 18.863010°E
- Country: Montenegro
- Region: Coastal
- Municipality: Budva

Population (2011)
  - Total: 333
- Time zone: UTC+1 (CET)
  - Summer (DST): UTC+2 (CEST)

Boreti (Montenegrin Cyrillic: Борети) is a coastal village and a popular tourist destination in the municipality of Budva, Montenegro.

== Demographics ==
According to the 2011 census, its population was 212.

- 173 Montenegrins (51.95%)
- 96 Serbs (28.83%)
- 64 Others (19.22%)
