= Prijevor, Budva =

Prijevor Пријевор
- Village
- Location within Montenegro
- Coordinates: 42.294902°N 18.807923°E
- Country: Montenegro
- Region: Coastal
- Municipality: Budva

Population (2011)
  - Total: 713
- Time zone: UTC+1 (CET)
  - Summer (DST): UTC+2 (CEST)
- Postal code: 85316
- Area code: +382 33
- Vehicle registration: BD

Prijevor (Montenegrin Cyrillic: Пријевор) is a village in the municipality of Budva, Montenegro.

== Demographics ==
According to the 2011 census, its population was 713.

Ethnicity in 2011
Ethnicity	Number	Percentage
Serbs	291	40.8%
Montenegrins	216	30.3%
Egyptians	124	17.4%
Russians	13	1.8%
other/undeclared	69	9.7%
Total	713	100%
