= Kaluđerac =

Kaluderac
- Village
- Location within Montenegro
- Coordinates: 42.199731°N 18.965453°E
- Country: Montenegro
- Region: Coastal
- Municipality: Budva

Population (2011)
  - Total: 279
- Time zone: UTC+1 (CET)
  - Summer (DST): UTC+2 (CEST)

Kaluderac (Montenegrin: Калудерац) is a village in the municipality of Budva, Montenegro.

== Demographics ==
According to the 2011 census, its population was 279.

Ethnicity in 2011
Ethnicity	Number	Percentage
Montenegrins	132	47.3%
Serbs	99	35.5%
other/undeclared	48	17.2%
Total	279	100%
