= Franc Jozeph Island =

Island in Albania

- Location within Albania

Geography
- Location: Buna river
- Coordinates: 41°50′50″N 19°22′29″E
- Area: 0.05 km^{2} (0.019 sq mi)
- Highest elevation: 4 m (13 ft)

Administration
- Albania
- County: Shkodër County
- Municipal unit: Velipojë

Franc Jozeph Island (or Franz Josef, Franz Jozeph, etc.) (Albanian: Ishulli i Franc Jozefit) was an island located at the mouth of the Buna river in Albania.

== Geography ==
The island was made up of rich alluvial soil and becomes a peninsula depending on the size of the river's flow. This island was an important nesting ground for many seabirds, especially the family Ardeidae.

The island was low ground covered with a sandy seashore and dominated by alder trees. The trees were mostly 75 years of age and reached a height of 16 m (52 ft). The island received few foreign tourists and was attractive for its quietness.

The name of the island was given by Austrian cartographers in 1870. It is believed that the name was chosen in honor of the Emperor Franz Joseph I of Austria.

Franz Joseph Island disappeared in 2011.
