= Lepismachilis targionii =

Scientific classification
- Kingdom: Animalia
- Phylum: Arthropoda
- Clade: Pancrustacea
- Class: Insecta
- Order: Archaeognatha
- Family: Machilidae
- Genus: Lepismachilis
- Species: L. targionii

Binomial name
- Lepismachilis targionii (Grassi, 1887)

Species of archaeognatha

Lepismachilis targionii is a species in the genus Lepismachilis of the family Machilidae which belongs to the insect order Archaeognatha (jumping bristletails).
