= Lepismachilis philippi =

Scientific classification
- Kingdom: Animalia
- Phylum: Arthropoda
- Clade: Pancrustacea
- Class: Insecta
- Order: Archaeognatha
- Family: Machilidae
- Genus: Lepismachilis
- Species: L. philippi

Binomial name
- Lepismachilis philippi Wygodzinsky, 1953

Species of archaeognatha

Lepismachilis philippi is a species in the genus Lepismachilis of the family Machilidae which belongs to the insect order Archaeognatha (jumping bristletails).
