= Brajići, Budva =

Brajići Брајићи
- Village
- Location within Montenegro
- Coordinates: 42.305679°N 18.898754°E
- Country: Montenegro
- Region: Coastal
- Municipality: Budva

Population (2011)
  - Total: 32
- Time zone: UTC+1 (CET)
  - Summer (DST): UTC+2 (CEST)

Brajići (Montenegrin: Брајићи) is a small village in the municipality of Budva, Montenegro.

== Demographics ==
According to the 2011 census, its population was 32.

Ethnicity in 2011
Ethnicity	Number	Percentage
Montenegrins	15	46.9%
Serbs	7	21.9%
other/undeclared	10	31.3%
Total	32	100%
