= Podostrog =

Podostrog Подострог
- Village
- Location within Montenegro
- Coordinates: 42.300223°N 18.840675°E
- Country: Montenegro
- Region: Coastal
- Municipality: Budva

Population (2011)
  - Total: 688
- Time zone: UTC+1 (CET)
  - Summer (DST): UTC+2 (CEST)

Podostrog (Montenegrin: Подострог) is a village in the municipality of Budva, Montenegro. There is a monastery by the name of Podmaine nearby.

== Demographics ==
According to the 2011 census, its population was 688.

Ethnicity in 2011
Ethnicity	Number	Percentage
Serbs	299	43.5%
Montenegrins	295	42.9%
Russians	6	0.9%
other/undeclared	88	12.8%
Total	688	100%
