= Hotel Mediteran =

Hotel in Ulcinj, Montenegro

Coordinates: 41.9236°N 19.2094°E

Hotel Mediteran Ulcinj
- Logo

General information
- Type: Hotel
- Location: Ulcinj, Montenegro, Montenegro

Website
- hotel-mediteran.com

The Hotel Mediteran Ulcinj, located in the coastal town of Ulcinj in Montenegro, is one of the first privatization deals completed by the new nation of Montenegro. The hotel was acquired by in July 2005 through the Commerce Court of Podgorica. The hotel is considered a vital property as part of national economic development.

As part of its acquisition of the resort facility, Husein Becovic through his Becovic Management Group, agreed to invest court-stipulated funds, to renovate the property, in order to return it to its status as a popular destination resort on the Adriatic Coast.

The Facility had been a resort and hospitality asset of Ulcinj-based hotel-tourist company, Ulcinjska Rivijera. According to the Purchase Agreement, BMG's required to invest no less than 6,150,000.00 Euros in the renovation of the Property, within a three-year period. BMG purchased the property through a contract executed in Ulcinj; specifically Sales Agreement Number 1171 dated July 25, 2005.

The New York Times cited Hotel Mediteran of Ulcinj, along with Ada Bojana and Velika Plaza of the Ulcinj South Coast of Montenegro, as among "The Top Places to Go in 2010."

Hotel Mediteran provides 134 guest rooms in six guest buildings facing the Adriatic Sea and Stari Grad (old town) Ulcinj. Room range from a standard double bedded room to a family style room which can accommodate up to 4 guests.
