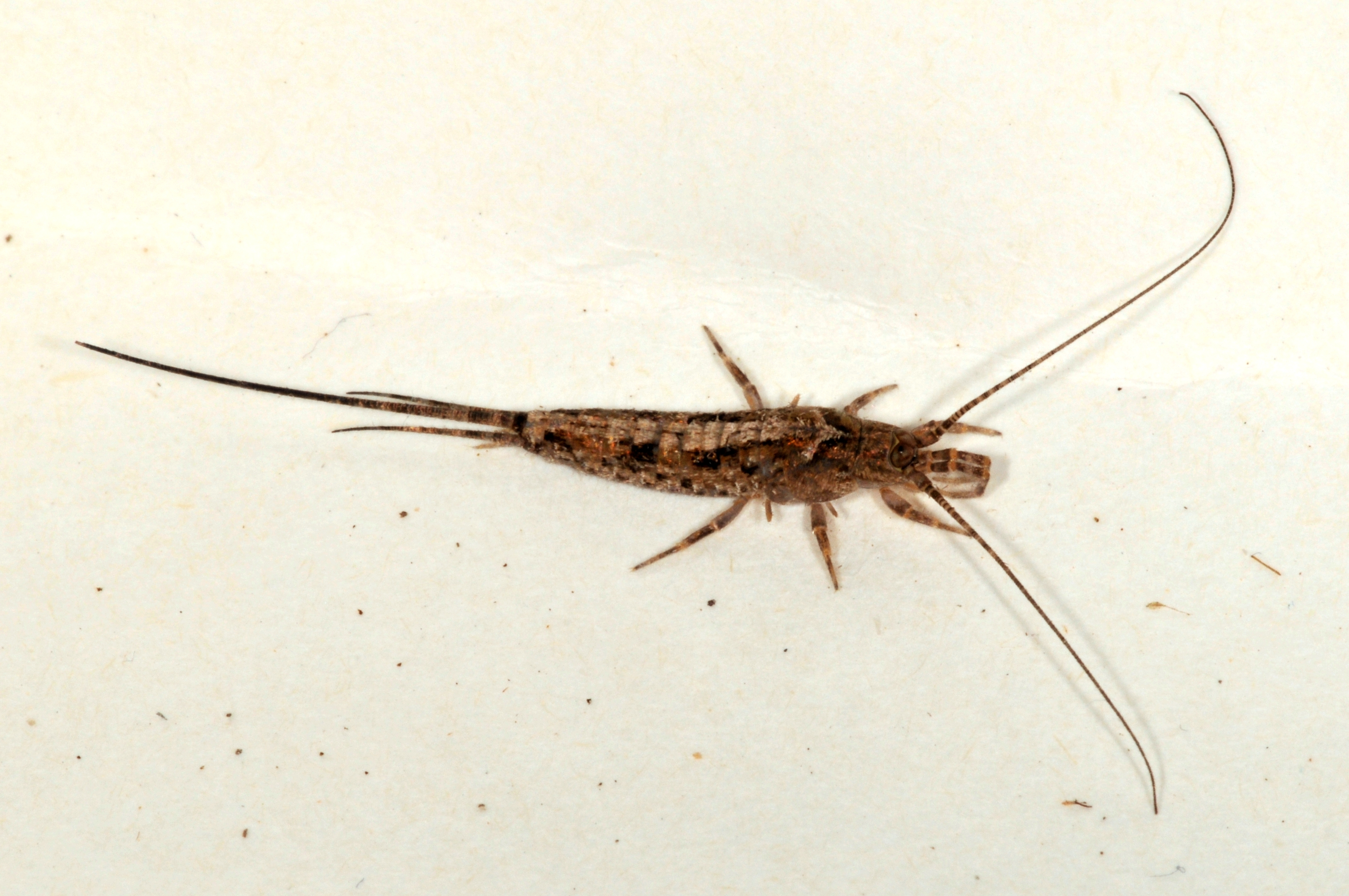

Scientific classification
- Kingdom: Animalia
- Phylum: Arthropoda
- Clade: Pancrustacea
- Class: Insecta
- Order: Archaeognatha
- Family: Machilidae
- Genus: Lepismachilis; Verhoeff, 1910

= Lepismachilis =

Genus of jumping bristletails

Lepismachilis is a genus of jumping bristletails in the family Machilidae. There are more than 20 described species in Lepismachilis.

== Species ==
These 22 species belong to the genus Lepismachilis:

- Lepismachilis affinis Gaju, Bach & Molero, 1993
- Lepismachilis alexandrae Kaplin, 2018
- Lepismachilis campusminus Bach, 1982
- Lepismachilis cana Wygodzinsky, 1941
- Lepismachilis cisalpina Wygodzinsky, 1941
- Lepismachilis gimnesiana Mendes, 1981
- Lepismachilis handschini Wygodzinsky, 1950
- Lepismachilis handseni Wygodzinsky, 1941
- Lepismachilis hauseri Bitsch, 1974
- Lepismachilis hoferi Bitsch, 1974
- Lepismachilis insularis Janetschek, 1955
- Lepismachilis istriensis Janetschek, 1959
- Lepismachilis janetscheki Stach, 1958
- Lepismachilis kahmanni Bitsch, 1964
- Lepismachilis notata Stach, 1919
- Lepismachilis osellai Bach, 1982
- Lepismachilis philippi Wygodzinsky, 1953
- Lepismachilis rozsypali Kratochvil, 1945
- Lepismachilis sturmi Janetschek, 1955
- Lepismachilis targionii (Grassi, 1887)
- Lepismachilis transalpina Wygodzinsky, 1941
- Lepismachilis veronensis Bach, 1982
- Lepismachilis y-signata Kratochvil, 1945
