= Sveti Stefan =

Sveti Stefan Свети Стефан
- Town
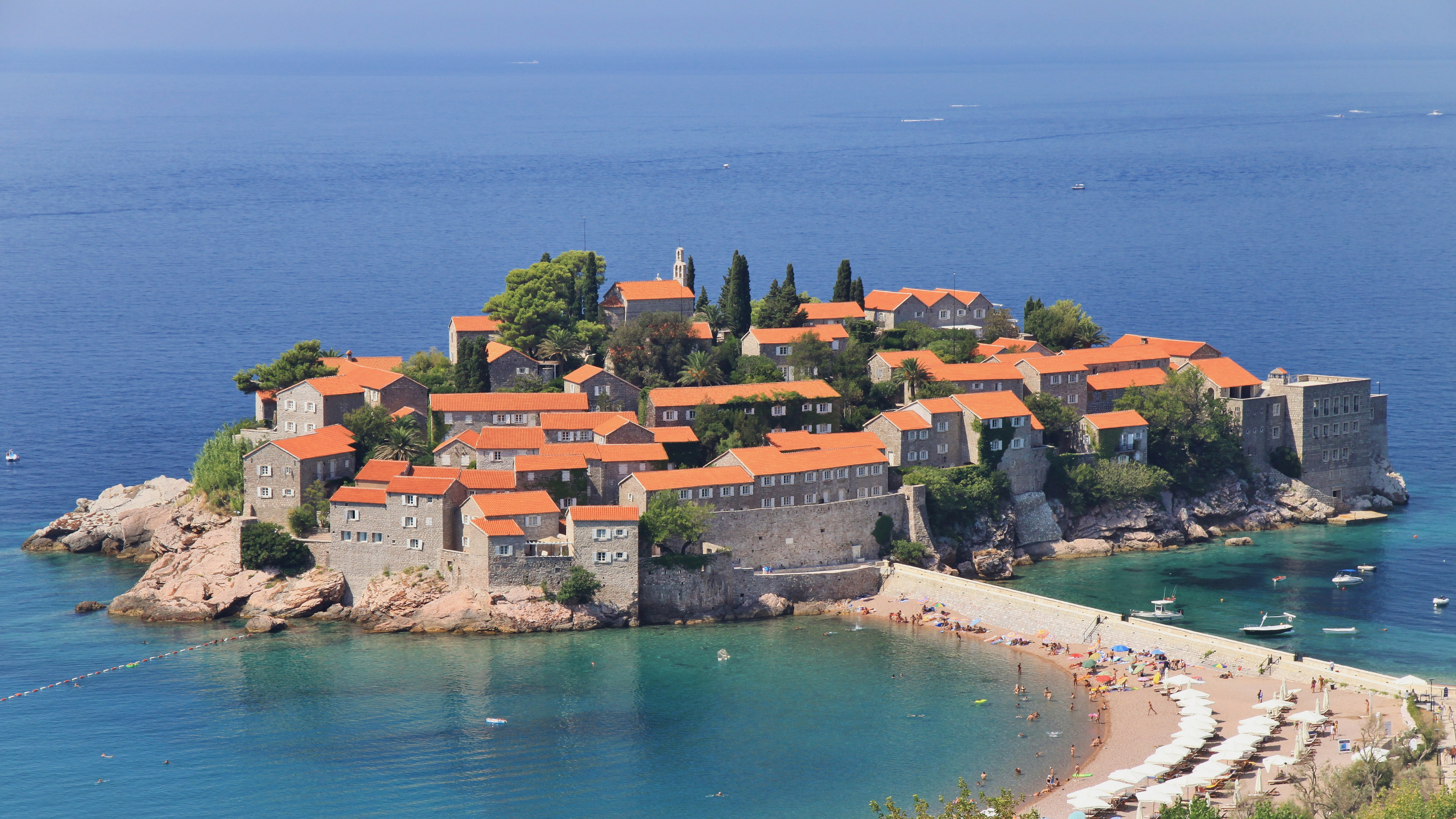
- Sveti Stefan island

- Location within Montenegro
- Coordinates: 42°15′21″N 18°53′28″E
- Country: Montenegro
- Region: Coastal
- Municipality: Budva

Population (2011)
  - Total: 364
- Time zone: UTC+1 (CET)
  - Summer (DST): UTC+2 (CEST)
- Postal code: 85315

Sveti Stefan (Montenegrin and Serbian: Свети Стефан, pronounced [sv̞ê̞ːtiː stê̞faːn]; lit. 'Saint Stephen') is a town in Budva Municipality, on the Adriatic coast of Montenegro, approximately 6 kilometres (3.7 mi) southeast of Budva. The town is known for the Aman Sveti Stefan resort, a 5-star franchise of the international group of Aman Resorts.

Sveti Stefan consists of a small island now connected to the mainland by a narrow tombolo and the mainland part, where most of the residents live.

== Geography ==
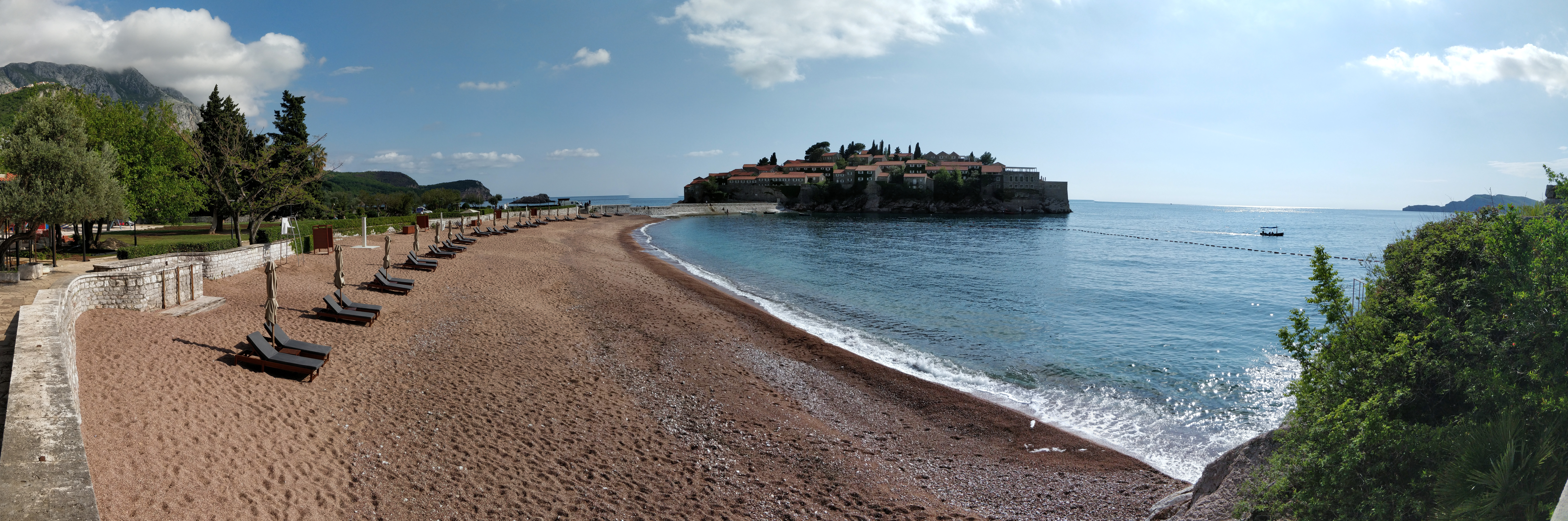
Sveti Stefan private beach

The island has a 2-kilometre (1.2 mi) coast line in the central part of Montenegro Adriatic coast line. It is situated to the south of Budva between Pržno and Petrovac na Moru. The pink sandy beaches of Sveti Stefan, Miločer Beach, and Queen's Beach are part of the coastline. The island encompasses an area of 12,400 m^{2} (133,000 sq ft).

== History ==
The earliest record of Sveti Stefan is as the capital of the Paštrovići community, which became a protectorate of the Republic of Venice in 1423, having been independent since the twelfth century. The Paštrovići accepted Venetian sovereignty because they were fearful of attack from the Turks. They retained considerable autonomy and paid no tribute to Venice, in return for ceasing piracy against Venetian ships.

According to a legend recounted by Stjepan Mitrov Ljubiša, the town fortification was funded after Paštrovići looted Turkish ships moored in front of Jaz during Barbarossa's siege of Kotor in 1539. The town was razed shortly after, during the Fourth Ottoman–Venetian War. After continuous pleas by Paštrovići, the Venetian Republic agreed to rebuild it in the 16th century. In the 15th century, the fortified village was built to defend against the Turks and became a haven for pirates of the Adriatic.

Initially, the island with its fortress had twelve families. In the 1800s, a village was established on the island with a population of about 400 people. Villa Miločer was built between 1934 and 1936 as the summer residence of Queen Marija Karađorđević (1900–1961) of the Karađorđević family of Serbia, which was refurbished as part of the Aman Sveti Stefan resorts that opened in 2008–2009. The villa, surrounded by 800 olive trees, is laid out over a 32-hectare (79-acre) plot.

The population of the island declined in the first half of the twentieth century, as residents left to join the armed forces or to move overseas. From 400 inhabitants in the nineteenth century, there were just 20 remaining by 1954. The Yugoslav government converted it into a luxury hotel and moved the remaining inhabitants to the mainland, and the island village became an exclusive resort frequented by high-profile elites of the world.

One of the four churches belonging to Praskvica Monastery on Sveti Stefan was turned into a casino by the government. The resort was visited by many celebrities, including Orson Welles, Elizabeth Taylor, Sophia Loren, Marilyn Monroe, Princess Margaret, Carlo Ponti, Ingemar Stenmark, and Kirk Douglas. It was described as "a '70s Adriatic playground on a hilly peninsula that's barely connected to the mainland". It was also a venue for political conferences and an occasional chess venue, attracting top-class players such as Boris Spassky and Bobby Fischer. However, the breakup of Yugoslavia in the 1990s brought a decline to the resort.

The Government of Montenegro proposed to recreate the old charm of the island, inviting international bids for a revitalization project. The contract was awarded to Aman Resorts in 2007, and the refurbished resort was completed in 2009. The Aman Sveti Stefan has a 30-year lease. On 13 July 2010 Montenegrin Statehood Day, Italian tenor Andrea Bocelli gave a concert at the resort to mark the Golden Jubilee of the hotel. The hotel won the Hotel of the Year award from Gallivanter's Guide in 2010.

== Demographics ==
According to the 2011 census, the town has a population of 364.

Population by ethnicity in 2011:

- 127 Montenegrins
- 206 Serbs
- 15 Undeclared
- 16 Others

== Aman Sveti Stefan ==
Aman Sveti Stefan
- Аман Свети Стефан
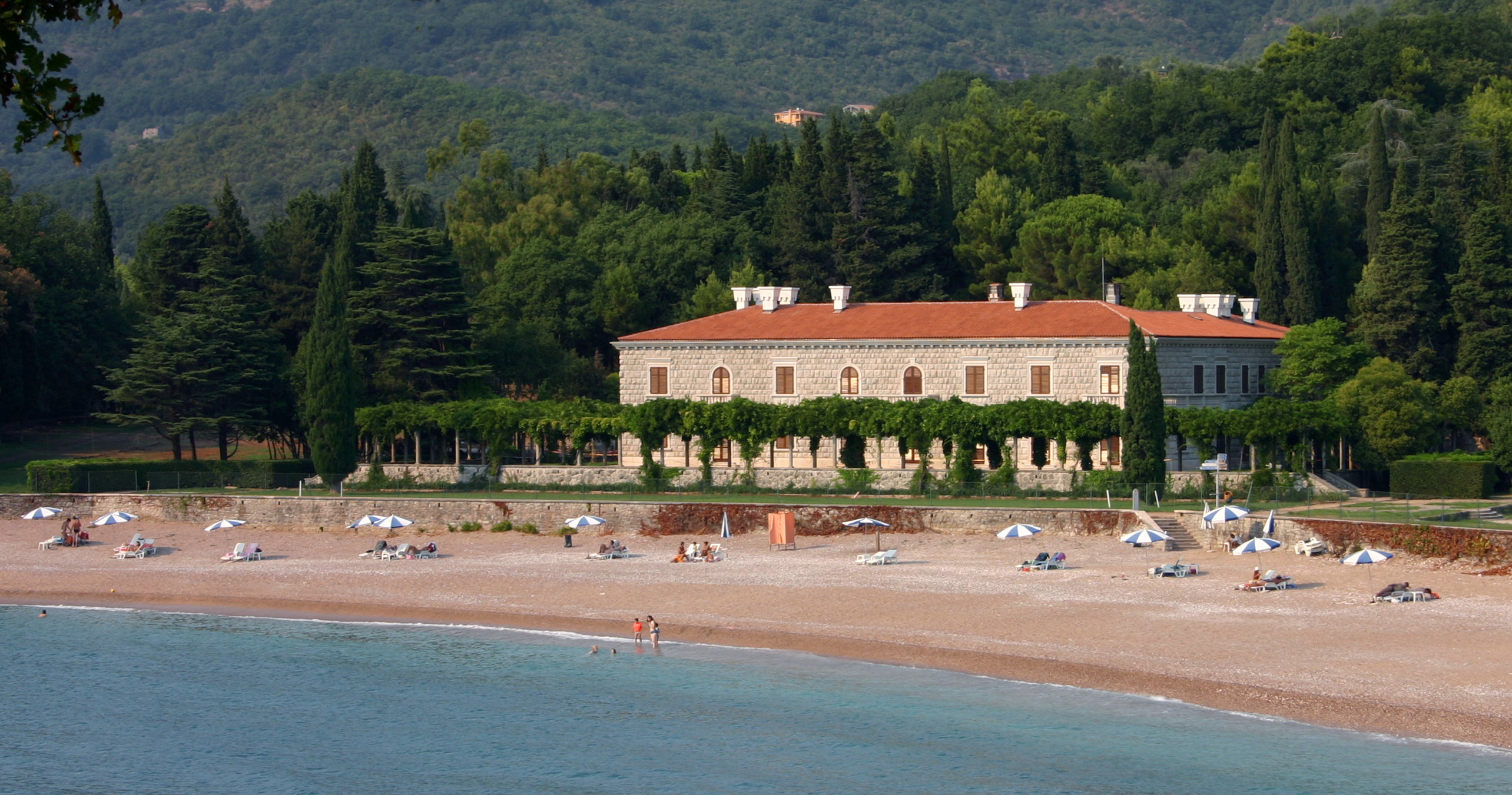
- Villa Miločer

- Location within Montenegro

General information
- Location: Sveti Stefan, Budva Municipality, Montenegro
- Opening: December 2008
- Closed: 2020
- Owner: Aman Resorts

Other information
- Number of rooms: 51
- Number of suites: 8

Website
- Aman Sveti Stefan

Aman Sveti Stefan (formerly Sveti Stefan Hotel) is a hotel resort in the town of Sveti Stefan, on the Adriatic coast of Montenegro. The resort includes the islet of Sveti Stefan and part of the mainland, where the Villa Miločer (pronounced [vîla mîlɔ̝tʃe̞r]) part of the resort is located. The hotel is a 5-star franchise hotel of the international group of Aman Resorts, completed in 2009 and operating under a 30-year lease. The hotel has been closed since early 2020 due to COVID-19 pandemic, and remains closed with no announced reopening date. In communication to guests and media, Aman has indicated security concerns and conflicts with government entities as reasons for continued closure.

=== Facilities ===
The Aman Sveti Stefan resort has 58 guest rooms, cottages, and suites, including 8 suites that are part of the Villa Miločer. The Villa Miločer was built between 1934 and 1936 as the summer residence of Queen Marija Karađorđević (1900–1961). Out of the eight suites of Villa Miločer, two are Queen Marija Suites forming an annex structure. The main dining of the resort on the island of Sveti Stefan is The Piazza, an open-air square in the heart of the island's village which includes the Taverna, Enoteca, Pasticceria, an Antipasti Bar, and a Cigar Room.
