= Gradište Monastery =

Monastery in Montenegro

Coordinates: 42.2022°N 18.9638°E

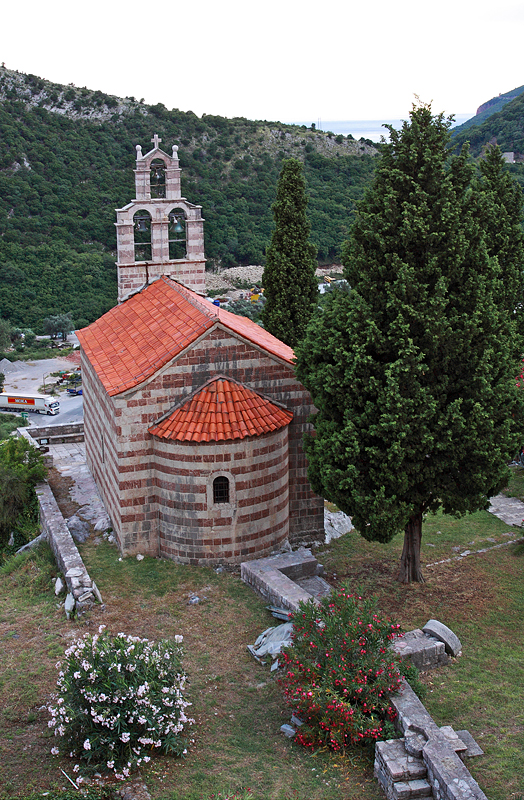
Gradište Monastery

Gradište Monastery is in Buljarica, Montenegro, not far from Petrovac na Moru. Gradište was originally a medieval inn of the old Serbian Empire. It also was affiliated with Kosovo's Visoki Dečani Monastery. Founded in 1116, the monastery consists of three churches and a dormitory. The three churches are St. Nicholas', built in 1610; the Assumption of the Holy Mother of God, whose frescoes date from 1620s; and Saint Sava's, both the former built in 1855 and the latter built in the early 1500s.

== History ==
Gradište Monastery is in Buljarica, Montenegro, not far from Petrovac na Moru. Like Reževići Monastery, Gradište was originally a medieval inn of the old Serbian Empire Zeta. It also was affiliated with Kosovo's Visoki Dečani Monastery. Founded in 1116, Gradište was mentioned in a document from the time of King Milutin in 1307. The monastery buildings comprise a dormitory building and three churches. The three churches are St. Nicholas', built in 1610; the Assumption of the Holy Mother of God, whose frescoes date from 1620s; and Saint Sava's, both the former built in 1855 and the latter built in the early 1500s. Saint Sava Church houses an iconostasis painted in 1864 by the Greek icon painter Nicholas Aspiotis, and an unusual painting of St Christopher with an animal head.

=== Church of St Nicholas ===
The Church of St Nicholas contains frescoes painted in 1619–1620. The cycle is a historiography of St George, and contains scenes identified in 1960 by Veljko Đurić as Saint George Confessing Christianity, The Whipping of Saint George, and The Torture of Saint George on a Wheel. At the time of Đurić's work, the frescoes were uncleaned. Later cleaning and study after the frescoes were damaged in an earthquake revealed a further scene, identified by Bojan Popović as Deliverance from the Limestone Quarry. Aleksandar Čilikov identified two more scenes from the Saint George cycle that were too fragmented to identify.
