= Jaz Beach =

Beach in Budva, Montenegro

Jaz Beach Плажа Јаз
- Beach
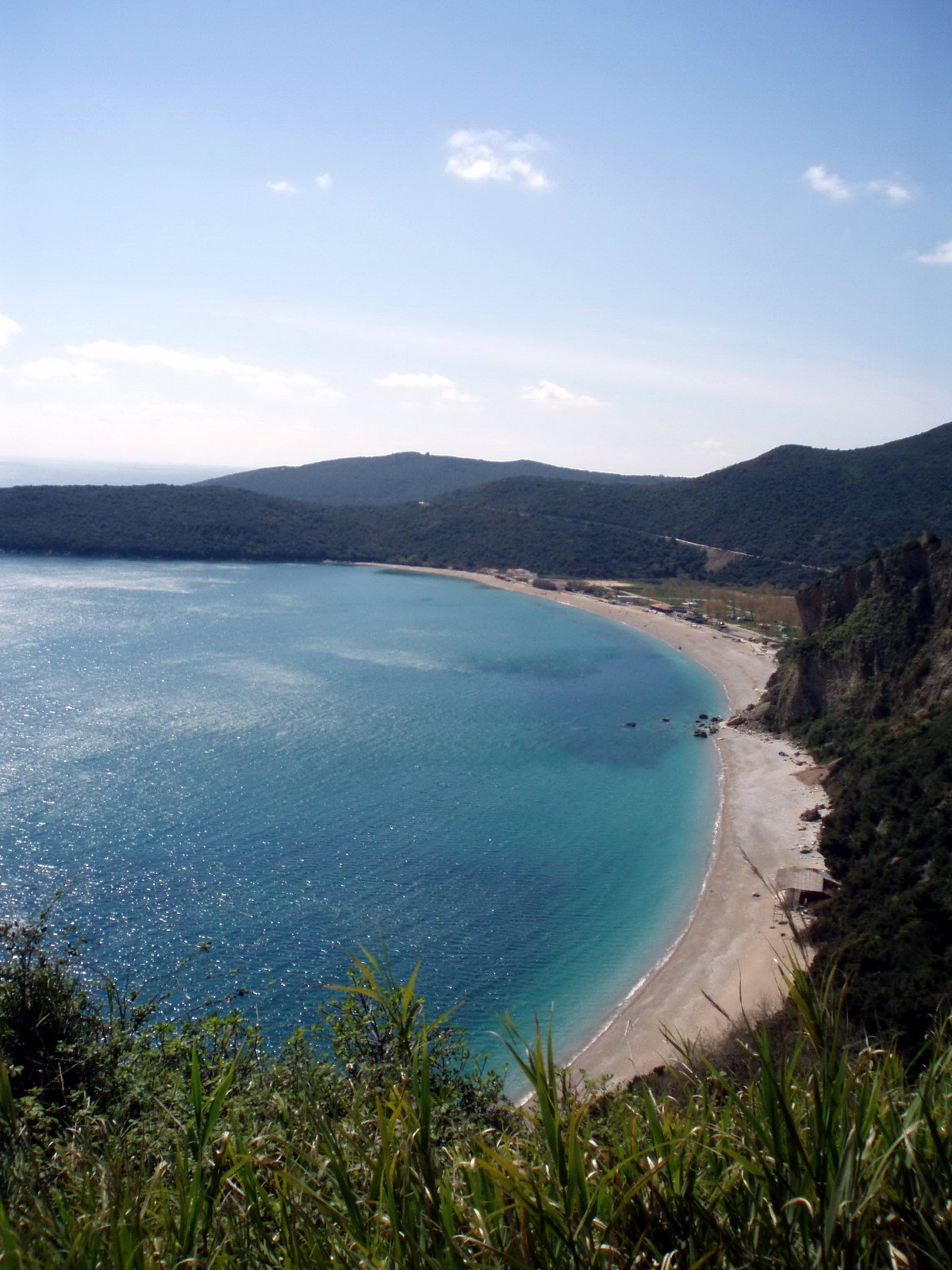

- Location within Montenegro
- Coordinates: 42°17′00″N 18°48′17″E
- Location: Budva, Montenegro

Jaz (Serbian Cyrillic: Јаз, pronounced [jâːz]) is a beach in the Budva municipality in Montenegro. It is located 2.5 km west of central Budva. It consists of two areas, one of which measures about 850 metres (or slightly under 1 km) and the other, formerly a nudist beach, stretches around 450 metres (0.45 km). It is unique in that it is a pebble beach; there is a campground along the main section of the beach as well, with an availability of 2,000 lots.

While it is one of the longer beaches in Montenegro—and a popular spot for sunbathing, swimming, camping, etc.—Jaz has gained prominence in the years since an area was remodeled, and can now host major musical acts and performances. A concert stage (with connected backstage facilities) was built, along with better road access, and seating for over 40,000 spectators. This project, plus other amenities, were constructed from the ground-up or refurbished from the existing infrastructure.

The vast hinterlands of Jaz Beach are considered among the greatest potentials for tourism development on the Montenegrin coast—and indeed the Mediterranean and Adriatic regions as a whole—as there are few undeveloped areas left on the coast besides Jaz (notably Buljarica, Velika Plaža and Ada Bojana).

== Concert location ==
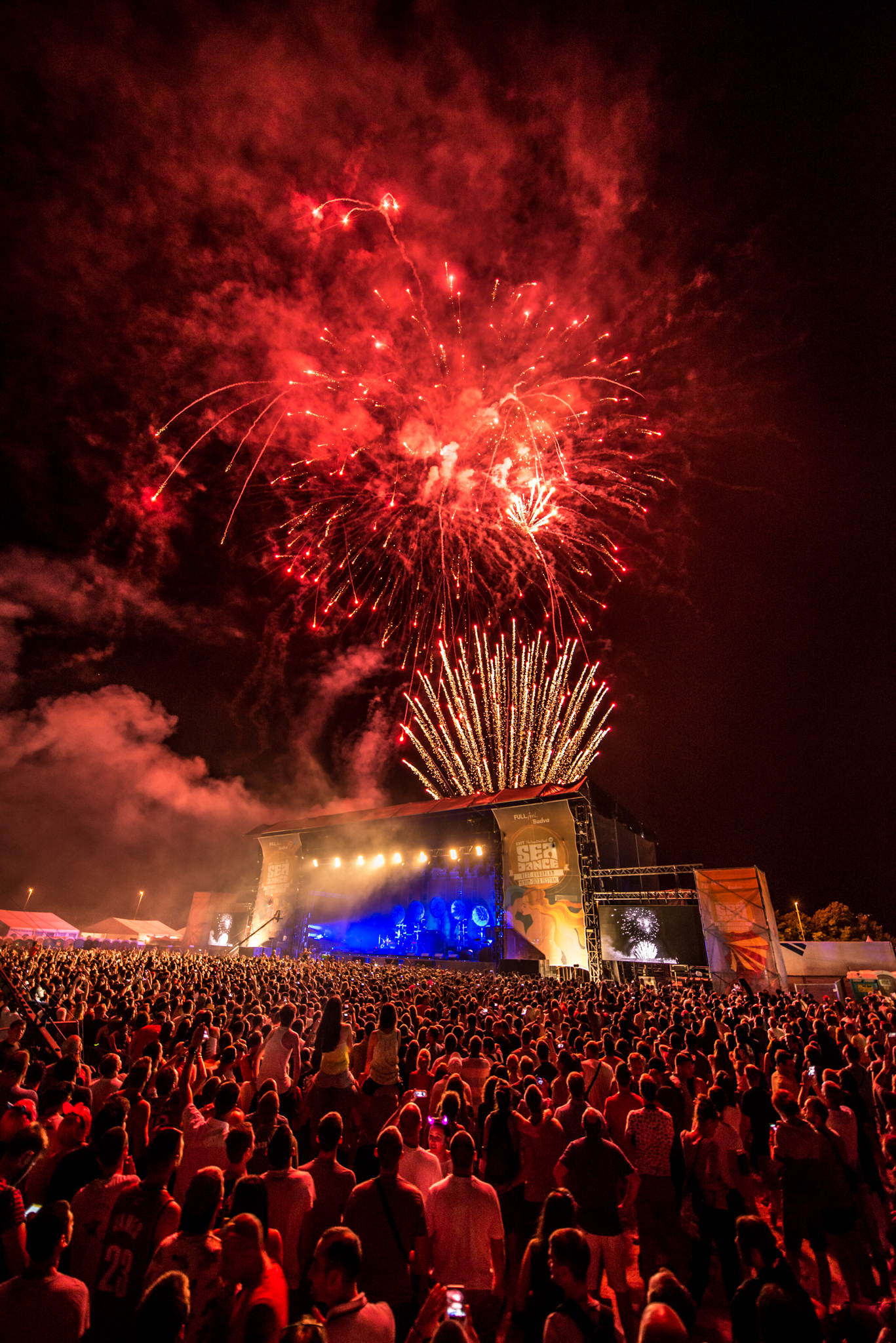
Sea Dance Festival, 2015

With the spring 2007 announcement of The Rolling Stones playing the beach in July 2007, Jaz Beach started to figure as open-air concert location for global acts. However, by summer 2009 the concerts ended.

The annual summer events were seen as an attempt to boost Montenegro's international image, as well as to promote the country as a tourist destination. In largest part they've been financed by Svetozar Marović, influential Montenegrin politician, and a native of Budva.

=== Summer 2007 and summer 2008 ===
The Rolling Stones played a show on July 9, 2007, as a stop on their A Bigger Bang Tour. For the concert, a large field in the beach hinterland was leveled, fenced, and made accessible, refurbishing the location and extending the road to the venue. The show was attended by approximately 40,000 people, with the city of Budva holding the distinction of being the smallest town ever to host a Rolling Stones gig.

The next notable event on the beach was the three-day Live Fest, held in August 2008, that featured Lenny Kravitz and Armand Van Helden (on August 5), Dino Merlin and DJ Set Retro Groove '70 (on August 6) and ending with Goran Bregović and Zdravko Čolić (on August 7).

Just over a month later, Madonna decided to perform her first-ever live concert in Montenegro, with her Sticky & Sweet Tour, on September 25, 2008. The concert was massively successful, with 47,524 people in attendance. The lively pre- and after-shows/parties featured musicians such as the band Van Gogh, Garik Sukachev, David Morales, Junior Jack and DJ Ura.

=== Live Music Festival 2009 Controversy ===
From early 2009, the organizers began touting the Live Music Festival to be held during summer 2009 with acts such as Tina Turner, Britney Spears, and Zucchero being announced.

Raka Marić confirmed to Vijesti that none of those singers will attend the festival due to the 2008 financial crisis. Although Tina Turner finished her worldwide tour that marked her 50th year in the business and is now free for new concerts, Marić has said that "she gave up touring and will never tour again" which is, of course, not actually the truth. He has also said that "Britney Spears is finishing her European leg in July 26" so they couldn't "get her to come".

Although it has been officially confirmed that 2009 guests will be Vlado Georgiev, Plavi Orkestar, Riblja Čorba and two famous DJs, second Live Music Festival has never been held.

=== Summer Fest 2012 ===
After a three-year absence, the musical performances returned in summer 2012 with the three-day event called Summer Fest organized from 5–8 August. Instead of globally known acts, the festival featured local ones such as: Nagual, Night Shift, Van Gogh, Hladno Pivo, Nipplepeople, Off Duty, S.A.R.S., Pero Defformero, Partibrejkers, Riblja Čorba, The Beatshakers, Gomila Nesklada, Who See, Prljavi Inspektor Blaža i Kljunovi, Kiki Lesendrić & Piloti, Orthodox Celts, and Junior Jack.

=== Sea Dance Festival 2014 ===
Sea Dance Festival 2014, a three-day summer music festival, was held at Jaz beach from 15 to 17 July 2014. The festival, which was part of the EXIT Adventure, hosted "BE HUMAN!" charity event at the Dukley Gardens, and featured acts from Jamiroquai, Underworld, Example Live, Bad Copy, Darkwood Dub, Kiril Džajkovski ft. TK Wonder, Eddy Temple-Morris, Eyesburn, Juan Atkins, Klingande, Lollobrigida, Mark Knight, Neno Belan & Fiumens, Patife, Rambo Amadeus, Roger Sanchez, Tara McDonald, Timo Maas, Urban & 4, Who See.

== See also ==
- Budva
- Budva Riviera
- Petrovac
- Buljarica
- Sveti Stefan
