= Bečići =

Bečići Бечићи
- Village
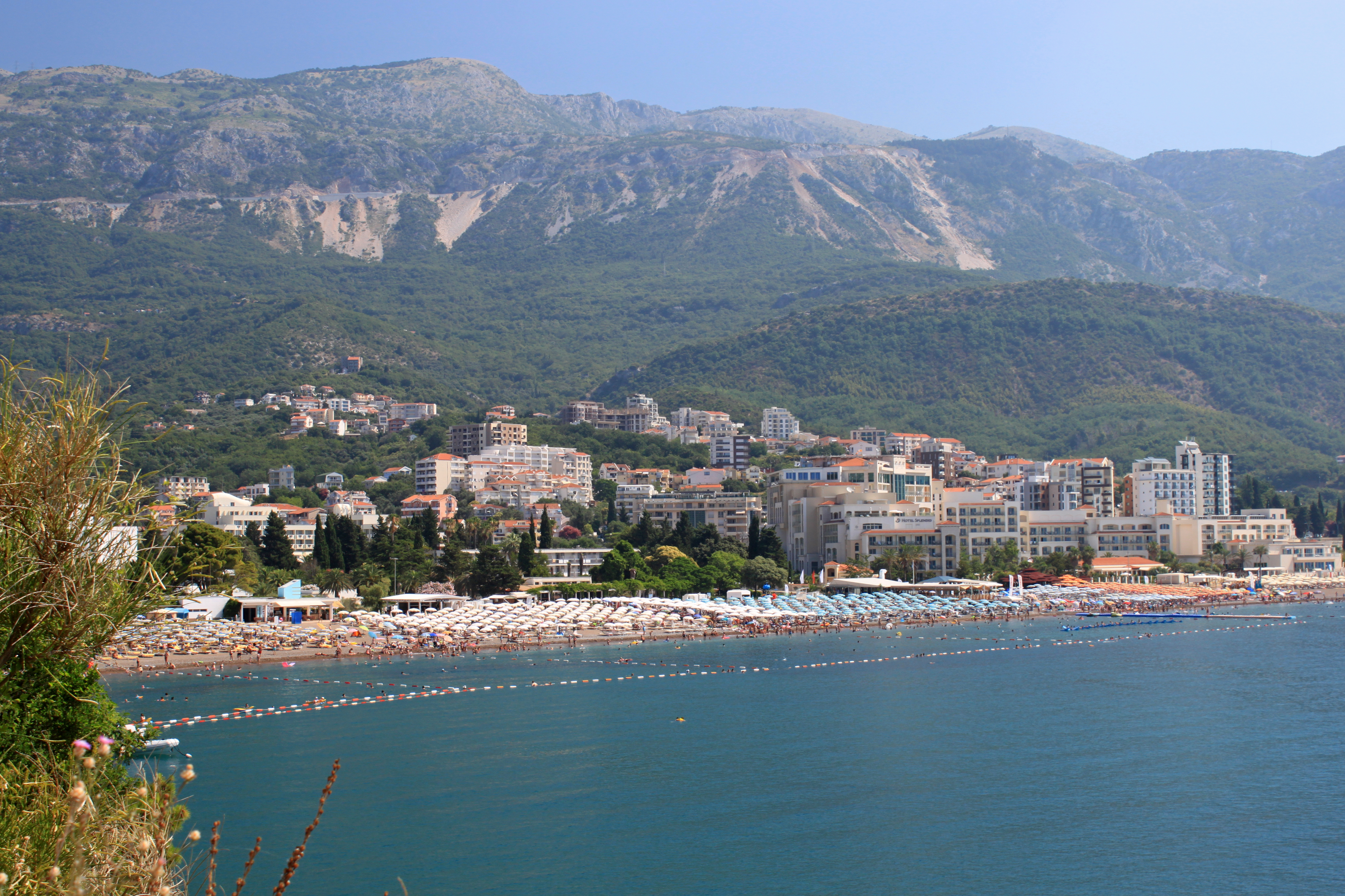
- Bečići as seen from the Zavala peninsula
- Interactive map of Bečići
- Coordinates: 42.2831052°N 18.8775362°E
- Country: Montenegro
- Region: Coastal
- Municipality: Budva

Population (2011)
  - Total: 895
- Time zone: UTC+1 (CET)
  - Summer (DST): UTC+2 (CEST)
- Postal code: 85316

Bečići (Cyrillic: Бечићи, pronounced [bɛ̂tʃitɕi]) is a town in the municipality of Budva, Montenegro. It is located south-east of Budva, and has 895 permanent residents (2011 census).

== Overview ==
It has a 1,950-metre-long sandy beach along the southern Adriatic. In 1935 it won the Grand Prix in Paris as the most beautiful beach in Europe. Several sections of the beach are private and are only accessible to the hotel guests. In contrast to Budva's large number of private housing units, Bečići town mostly consists of medium and large hotels. Some of them, such as the Mediteran, Iberostar Bellevue and Queen of Montenegro have been extensively refurbished, while the most significant greenfield addition was the Hotel Splendid, a luxurious five-star resort that cost 70 million euros to build. It was the choice of The Rolling Stones and Madonna as well as Brad Pitt and Angelina Jolie during their stay in Montenegro.

== Demographics ==
According to the 2023 census, its population was 1,046.

The results showed how Russian immigrants made up the largest ethnic group in the town. In total, over 40% of the population of Bečić are immigrants, one of the highest percentages in Europe.

Ethnicity in 2023
Ethnicity	Number	Percentage
Russians	315	30.1%
Montenegrins	266	25.4%
Serbs	262	25%
Ukrainians	110	10.5%
Other	64	6.1%
Undeclared	29	2.8%
Total	1,046	100%
