= Velika Plaža =

Beach in Ulcinj Municipality, Montenegro

Velika Plaža Plazhi i Madh Велика Плажа
- Beach
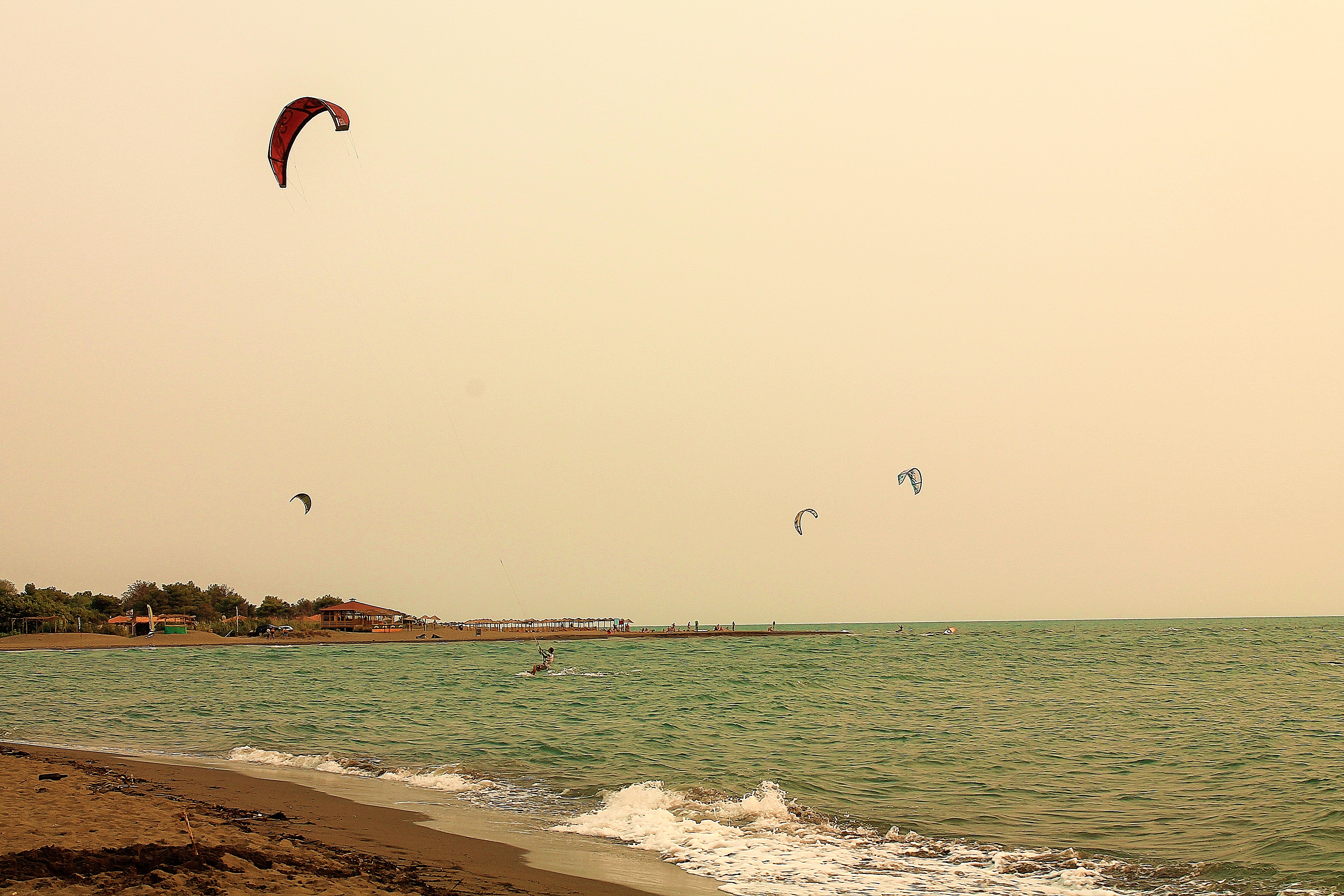

- Location within Montenegro
- Coordinates: 41°53′33″N 19°17′45″E
- Location: Ulcinj, Montenegro

Velika Plaža (Albanian: Plazhi i Madh; (Montenegrin Cyrillic: Велика Плажа), pronounced [ʋɛ̂likaː plǎːʒa];, lit. "Big Beach") is a beach in Ulcinj Municipality, Montenegro. It stretches from Port Milena in Ulcinj to the Bojana River, which separates it from Ada Bojana.

== Overview ==
The sand beach's length is 12,000 meters (8 miles), one of the longest in Europe and the longest beach in Montenegro.

The New York Times included Velika Plaža and Montenegro's South Coast (including Ada Bojana and Hotel Mediteran in a ranking of top travel destinations for 2010 - "Top Places to Go in 2010".

== Future development ==
Velika Plaža is a natural asset of Montenegro that the government hopes to see developed as part of the country's tourism development strategy, albeit in an environmentally friendly manner. The vast hinterland of the beach is mostly undeveloped, so it is potentially the site of the biggest greenfield investment on the Montenegrin coast.

So far, a public competition has been announced on creating a masterplan of developing a sustainable waterfront community, through means of public private partnership.

== Kitesurfing spot ==
There are a number of kitesurfing schools along the beach. Velika Plaža beach, near Ulcinj in Montenegro is the premier kiteboarding location on the Adriatic Coast. Fourteen kilometres strip of petty sand beach with strong cross onshore winds during summer afternoons make it suitable for safe learning. It is set in a protected natural area, surrounded by dunes and hidden by alluvial forest. Current is not that strong to present any significant danger. During the summer average temperature is 34°C, water temperature average is 23°C. Flat water spot is located at the southeast end of the beach, inside the river mouth.

=== See also ===
- Buljarica
- Ladies Beach
- Valdanos Inlet Beach
- Ada Bojana beach
