= Pržno, Budva =

Pržno Пржно
- Village
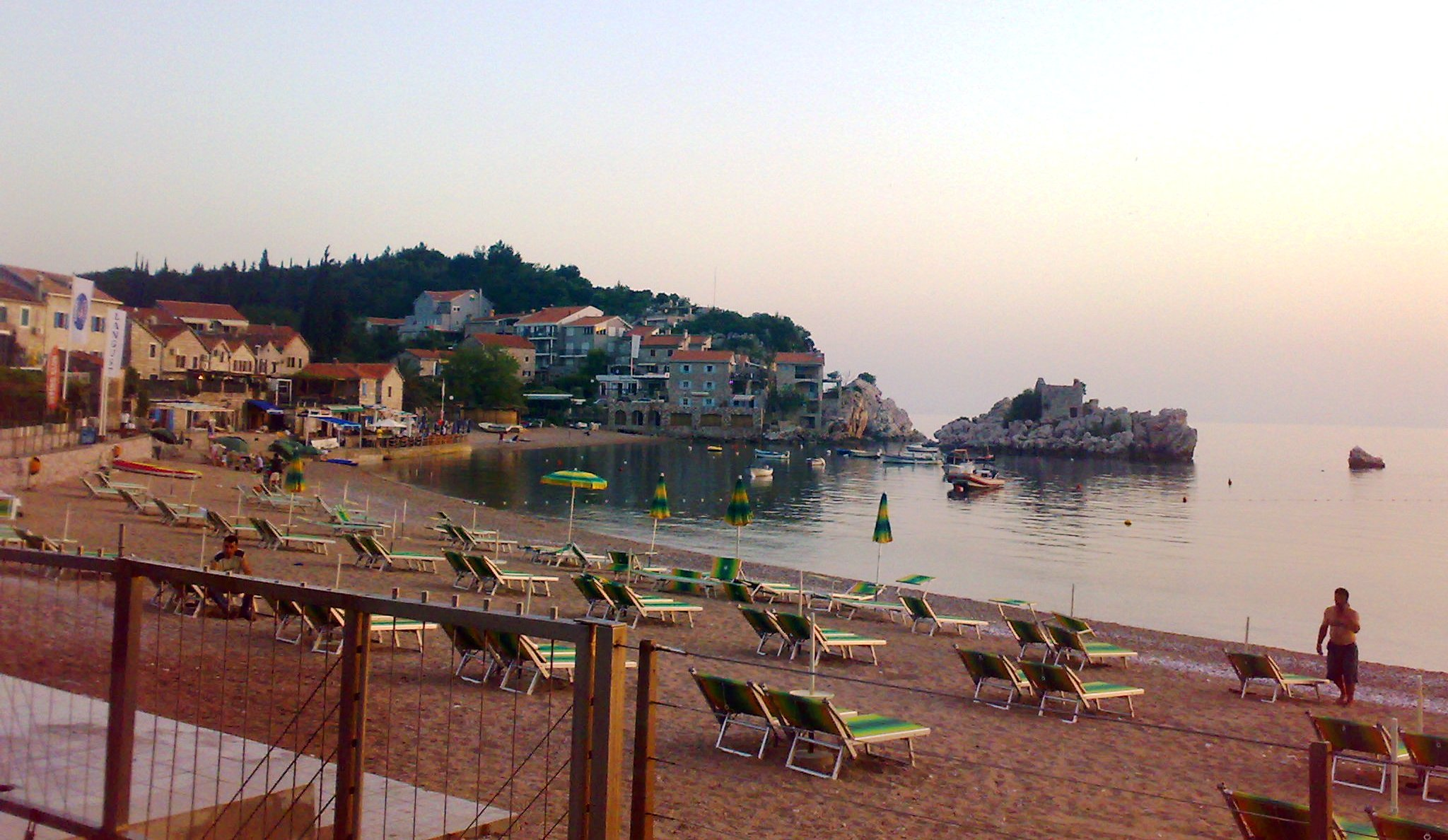

- Location within Montenegro
- Coordinates: 42.269176°N 18.894185°E
- Country: Montenegro
- Region: Coastal
- Municipality: Budva

Population (2011)
  - Total: 345
- Time zone: UTC+1 (CET)
  - Summer (DST): UTC+2 (CEST)

Pržno (Montenegrin: Пржно) is a small village in the municipality of Budva, Montenegro.

== Demographics ==
According to the 2011 census, its population was 345.

Ethnicity in 2011
| Ethnicity | Number | Percentage |
|---|---|---|
| Serbs | 169 | 49.0% |
| Montenegrins | 126 | 36.5% |
| other/undeclared | 50 | 14.5% |
| Total | 345 | 100% |
