= Ada Bojana =

Island in the Ulcinj Municipality in Montenegro

Coordinates: 41°51′45″N 19°21′40″E

Ада Бојана Ishulli i Bunës
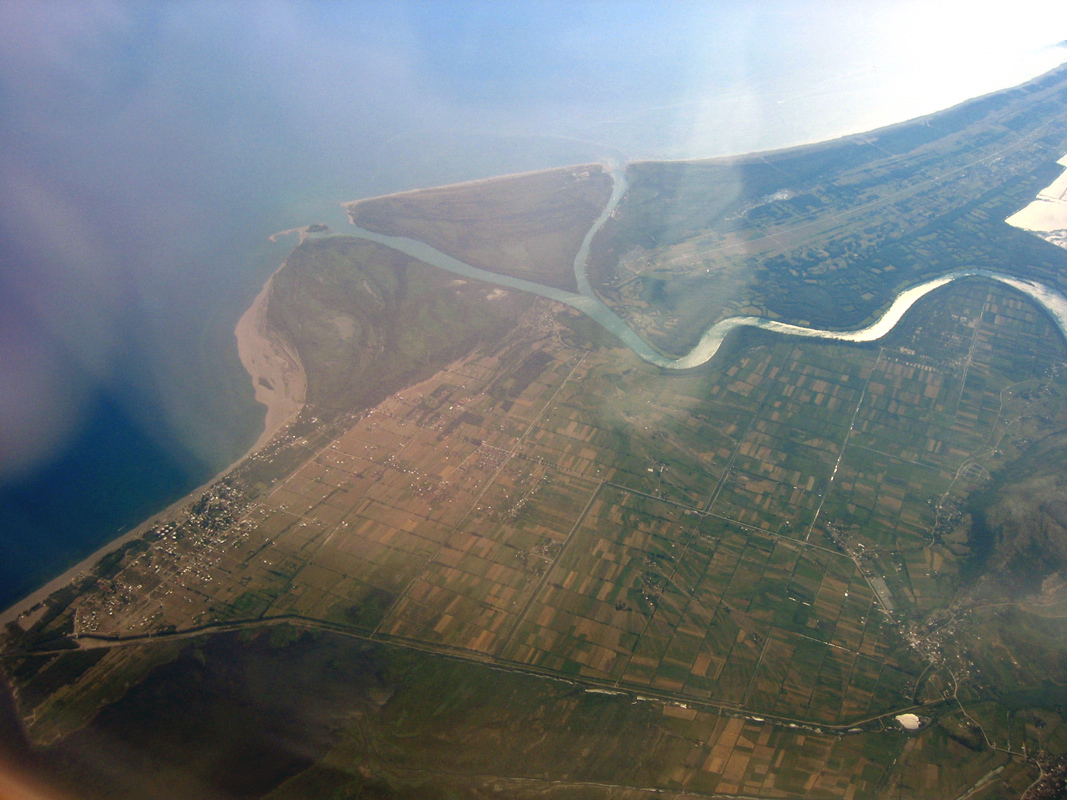
- Aerial photograph of the Bojana River delta with Bojana Island (Ada Bojana). Albania is on the bottom, while Montenegro is on the top, including the island.

- Location within Montenegro

Geography
- Location: Bojana River delta
- Total islands: 1
- Area: 4.81 km^{2} (1.86 sq mi)
- Area rank: 1 (in Montenegro)
- Length: 3 km (1.9 mi)
- Highest elevation: 3 m (10 ft)

Administration
- Montenegro
- Municipality: Ulcinj Municipality

Demographics
- Population: 201

Ada Bojana (Montenegrin Cyrillic: Ада Бојана, pronounced [ǎːda bɔ̌jana]; Albanian: Ishulli i Bunës) is an island in the Ulcinj Municipality in Montenegro. The name Ada means "river island" in Montenegrin.

The island is created by a river delta of the Bojana River. It is located on the southernmost tip of Montenegro, with the Bojana River separating it from Pulaj and Velipojë in the Albanian territory.

The island is of triangular shape, bordered from two sides by the Bojana River and by the Adriatic Sea from the southwest. It has an area of 4.8 square km. It is a popular place for nude tourists. Although in the Mediterranean region, Ada's dominant climate is subtropical.

It is a popular tourist destination, with a 3 kilometres (2 miles) long sandy beach with traditional seafood restaurants. Its main income comes from camping.

The New York Times included Ada Bojana and Montenegro's South Coast (including Velika Plaža and Hotel Mediteran) in their top travel destinations for 2010 – "Top Places to Go in 2010".
