= Buljarica =

Village in Budva, Montenegro

Buljarica Буљарица
- Village
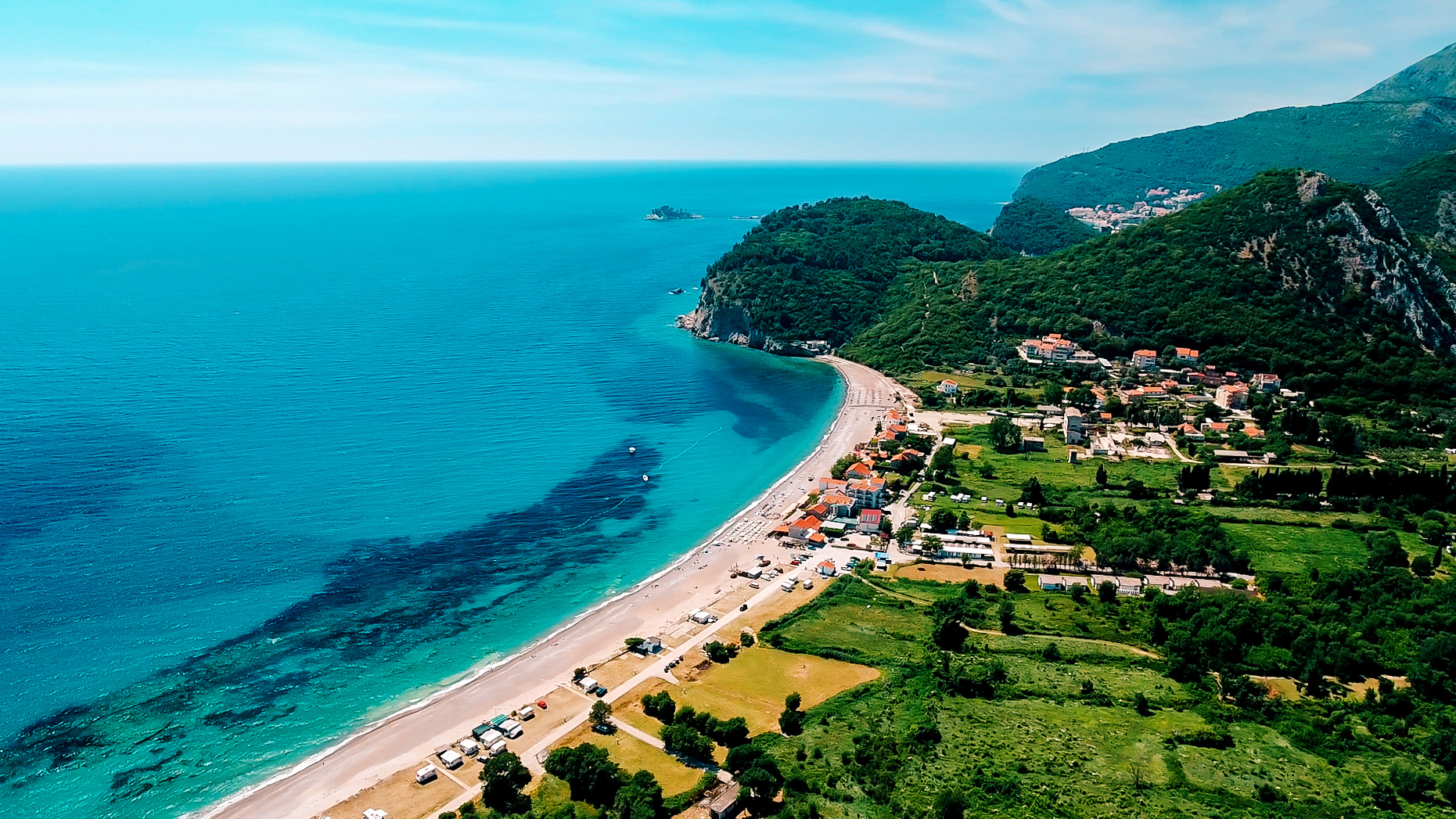

- Location within Montenegro
- Coordinates: 42°11′55″N 18°57′55″E
- Country: Montenegro
- Region: Coastal
- Municipality: Budva

Population (2011)
  - Total: 205
- Time zone: UTC+1 (CET)
  - Summer (DST): UTC+2 (CEST)

Buljarica (Montenegrin: Буљарица, pronounced [buʎǎrit͡sa]) is a small town in the municipality of Budva, Montenegro. Its beach is about 1 km (0.62 mi) from Petrovac in the direction of Bar, the beach is 2,250 m (7,382 ft) long.

== Geography ==
Buljarica has development potential to rival that of famed Velika Plaža of the south Montenegrin coast. Buljarican fields and the slopes of Dubovica hill are well suited for the development of tourism, and could potentially hold a city of Budva's size. Buljarica cove stretches from Resovo brdo cove to Dubovica, and has the largest beach of the otherwise limited beach areas of the Budva Riviera.

== Demographics ==
According to the 2011 census, its population was 205.

Ethnicity in 2011
Ethnicity	Number	Percentage
Montenegrins	122	59.5%
Serbs	63	30.7%
other/undeclared	20	9.8%
Total	205	100%

== See also ==
- Gradište Monastery
