= Mogren Fortress =

19th century Austro-Hungarian Fortress in Budva, Montenegro

- Тврђава Могрен (Montenegrin)
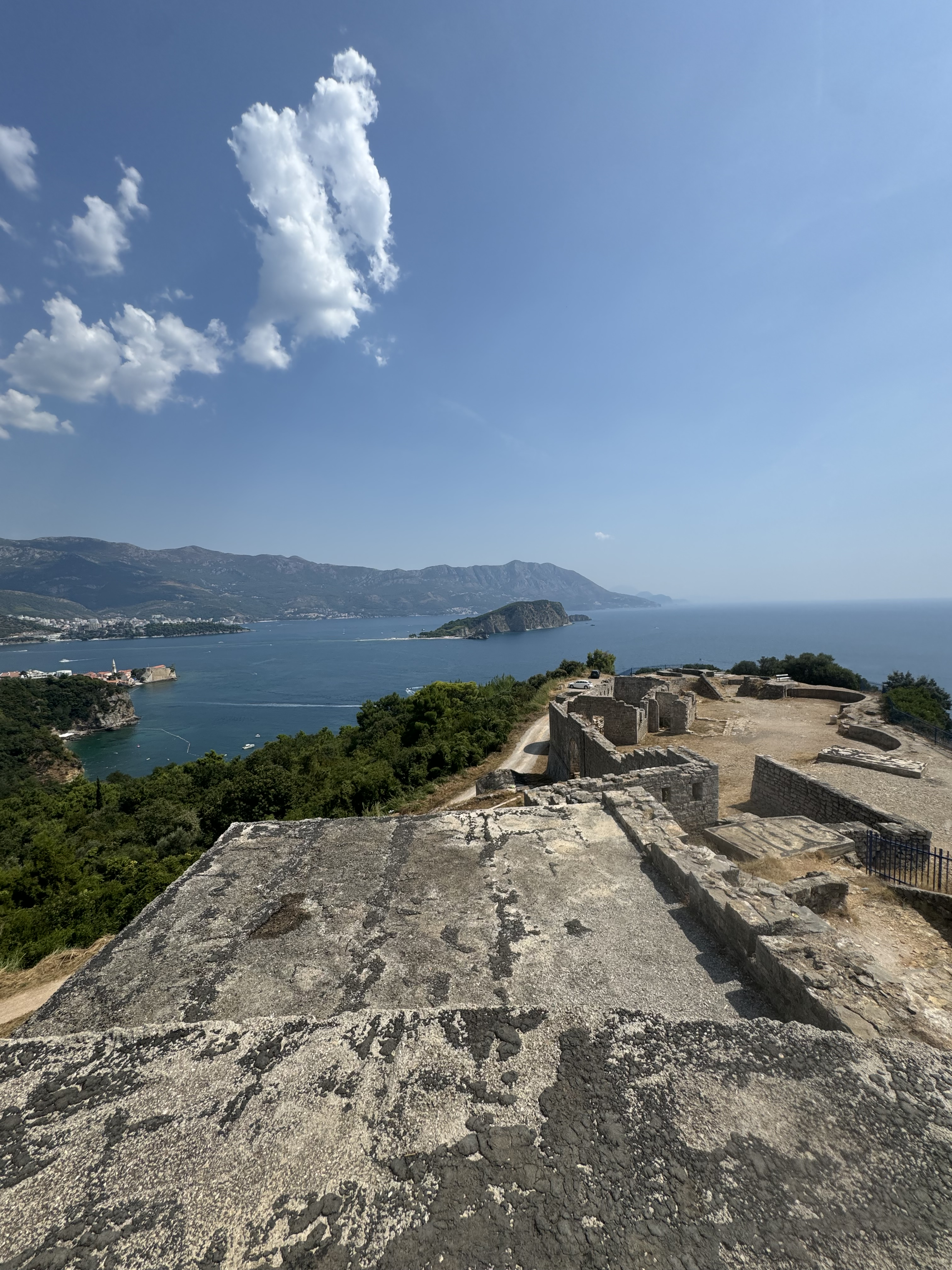
- The remains of the fortress on Spas Hill near Budva

- Location within Montenegro
- 42.2751°N 18.8270°E
- Location: Budva, Montenegro

History
- Built: 1860
- Built for: Austro-Hungarian Empire

Site notes
- Elevation: 110 metres (360 ft)
- Owner: Montenegro

Mogren Fortress (also known as Fort Mogren, Fort Jaz and Jaz troop) is a ruined fortress overlooking the Budva Riviera and Adriatic Sea in the municipality of Budva built by the Austrian Empire in 1860.

The fortress is set on the Spas Hill above the Mogren 2 Beach 1 km to the west of the Budva Old Town. Today, only the walls of the fortress and World War II bunkers remain.

The fortress is accessible by car (E65 & E80 Budva-Tivat road) and by a short hike up the hill from the Mogren 2 Beach below.

== History ==
=== Construction ===
The fortress, originally named Fort Jaz, was built in 1860 by soldiers of the Austrian Empire as a barracks and military base to defend the western borders of Budva and control all roads leading to the city.

The fortress was designed in a rectangular shape with high walls and towers on each corner. The fortress is set 110 metres (360 ft) on the Spas Hill above the Mogren 2 Beach 1 kilometre (0.62 mi) to the west of the Budva Old Town and 2 kilometres (1.2 mi) from the Budva city centre. The Budva Old Town, Sveti Nikola Island and Jaz Beach are visible across the sea.

=== World Wars ===
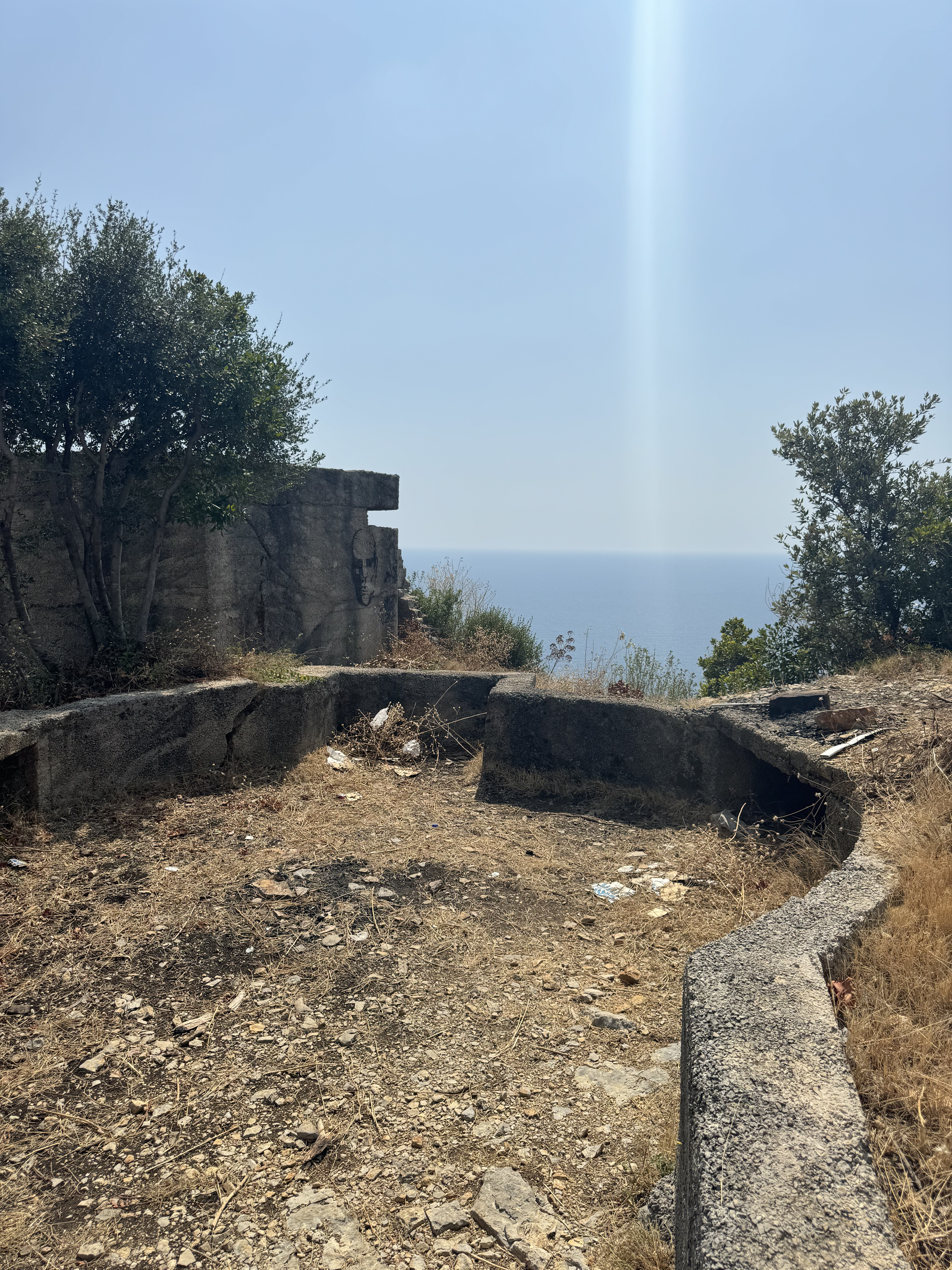
World War II Pillbox and Bunker

Following the Dissolution of Austria-Hungary, the fortress became property of the Kingdom of Yugoslavia and became known as the Mogren Fortress, after the Mogren Cape below.

During World War II, the fortress and its tunnels below were used as a warehouse of weapons and ammunition. World War II era pillboxes and bunkers remain visible to this day.

=== Post-War ===
Following World War II, the fortress fell into disrepair. The fortress was badly damaged in the 1979 Montenegro Earthquake and was never rebuilt.

In 2015, a plan for reconstruction and improvement of the fortress was proposed, including an auditorium for 320 visitors, exhibition hall, café, performance stage and parking. Despite suggestions from the city administration that the project would bring €35,500 in net revenue annually, members of the Budva Municipal Assembly voted against the project due to impact on authenticity and historical appearance.

In 2016, as part of the Budva 2020 initiative funded by the Budva Foundation, overgrown vegetation was removed from the fortress, and a parking lot, asphalt road and small information centre were constructed to serve the fortress.

== Tourism and preservation ==
The fortress offers a view of the Budva Riviera, including the Budva Old Town, Sveti Nikola Island, Jaz Beach, Pržno Beach, Petrovac Bay and Valdanos Bay near Ulcinj.

The fortress is accessible by car (E65 & E80 Budva-Tivat road) and by a short hike up the hill from the Mogren 2 Beach below.

Spas Hill, on which the fortress is located, is treated as a Special Natural Area and Mogren Beach and its surrounding area, including the fortress, is protected as a Category III Natural Monument.

== Picture gallery ==
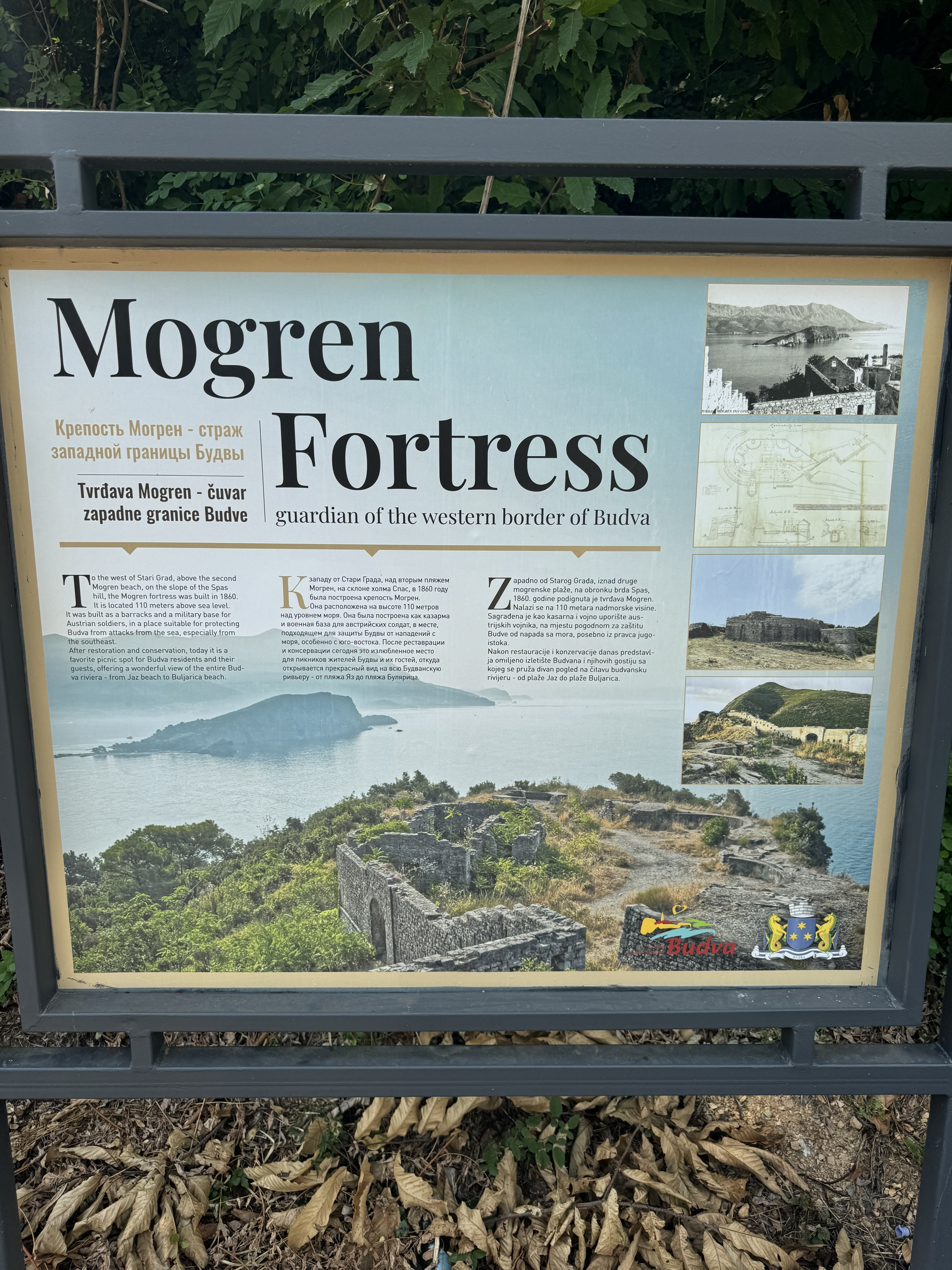
Visitor Information

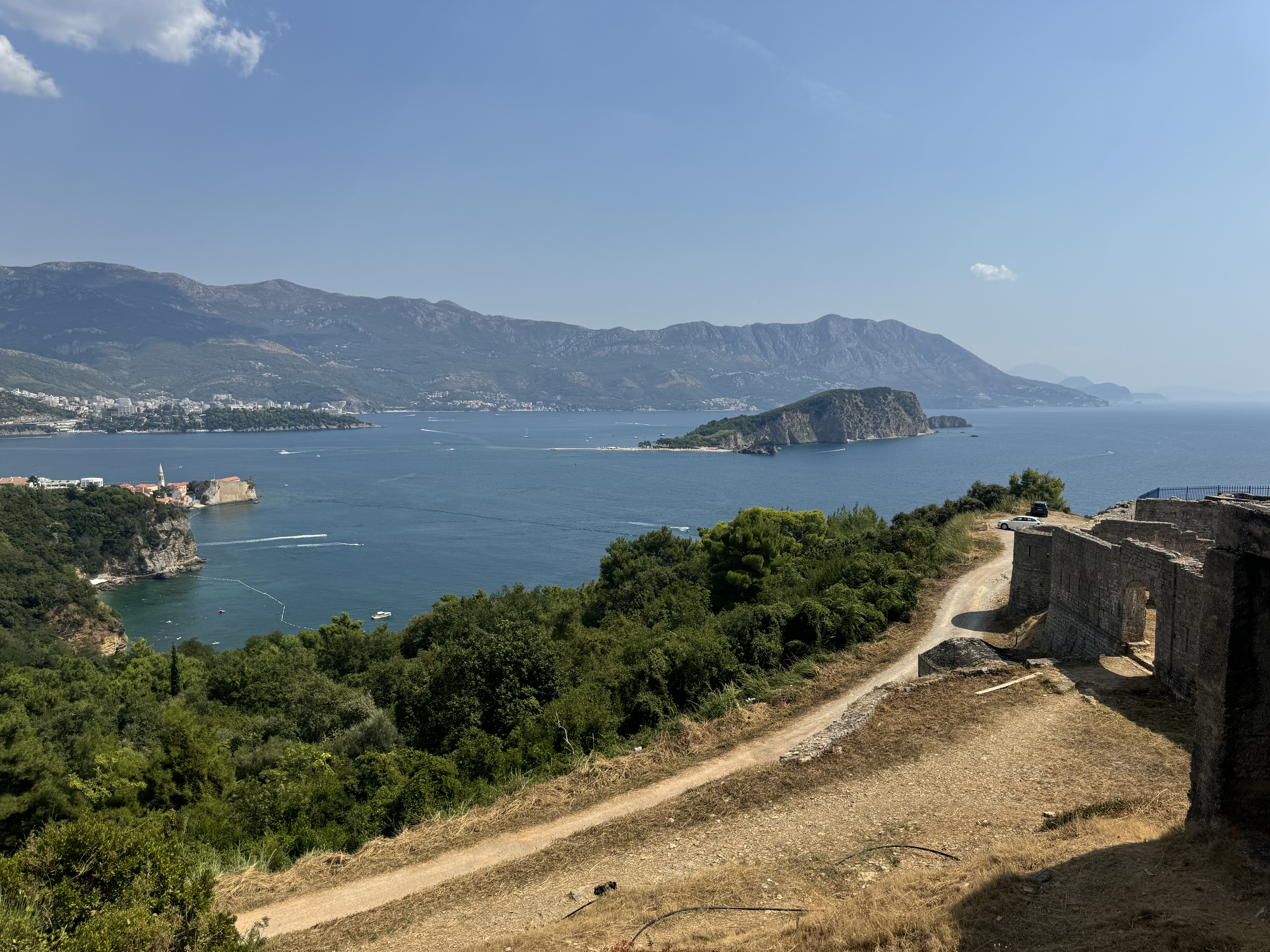
View to Sveti Nikola Island and the Old Town

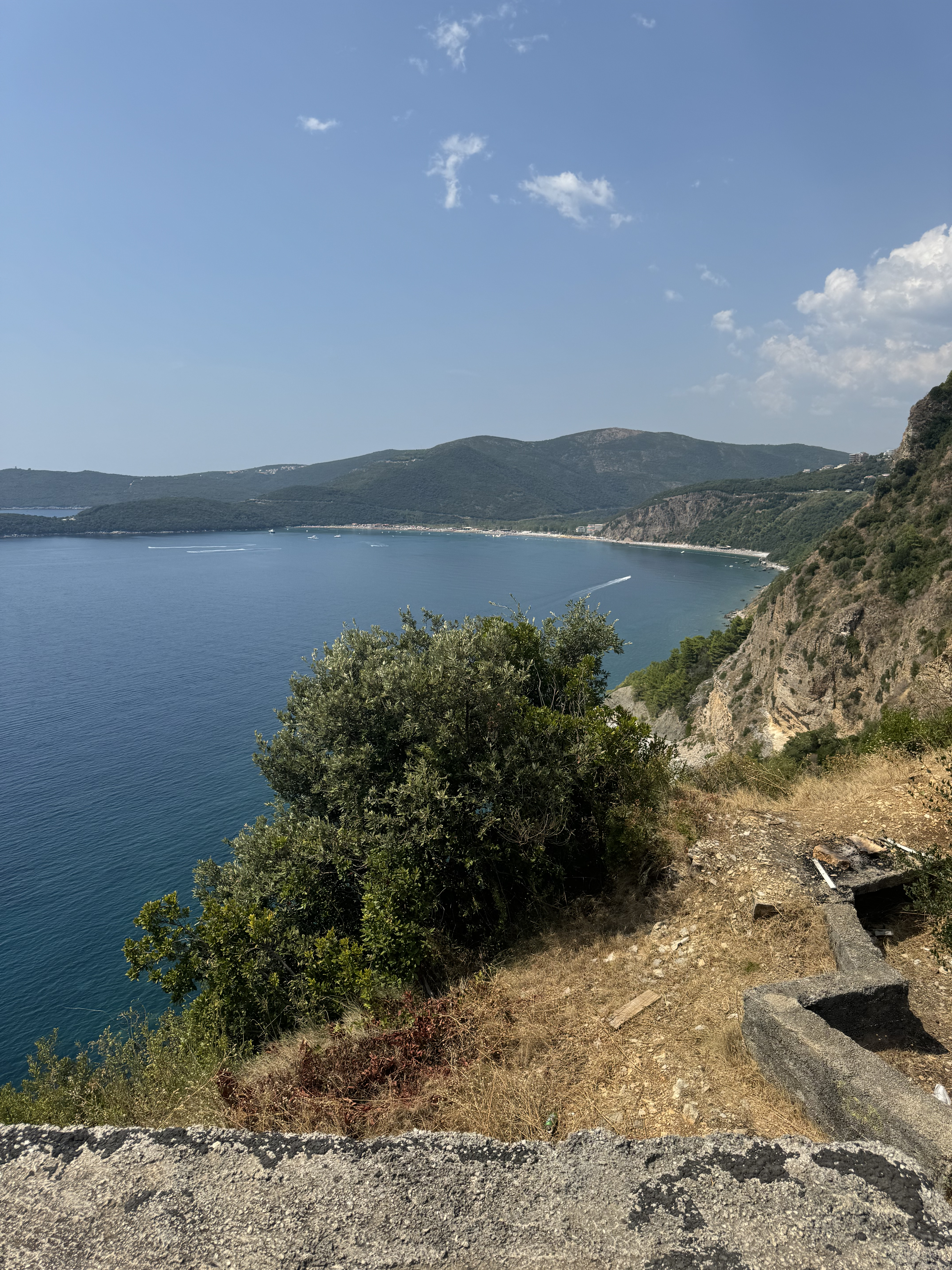
View west to Jaz Beach

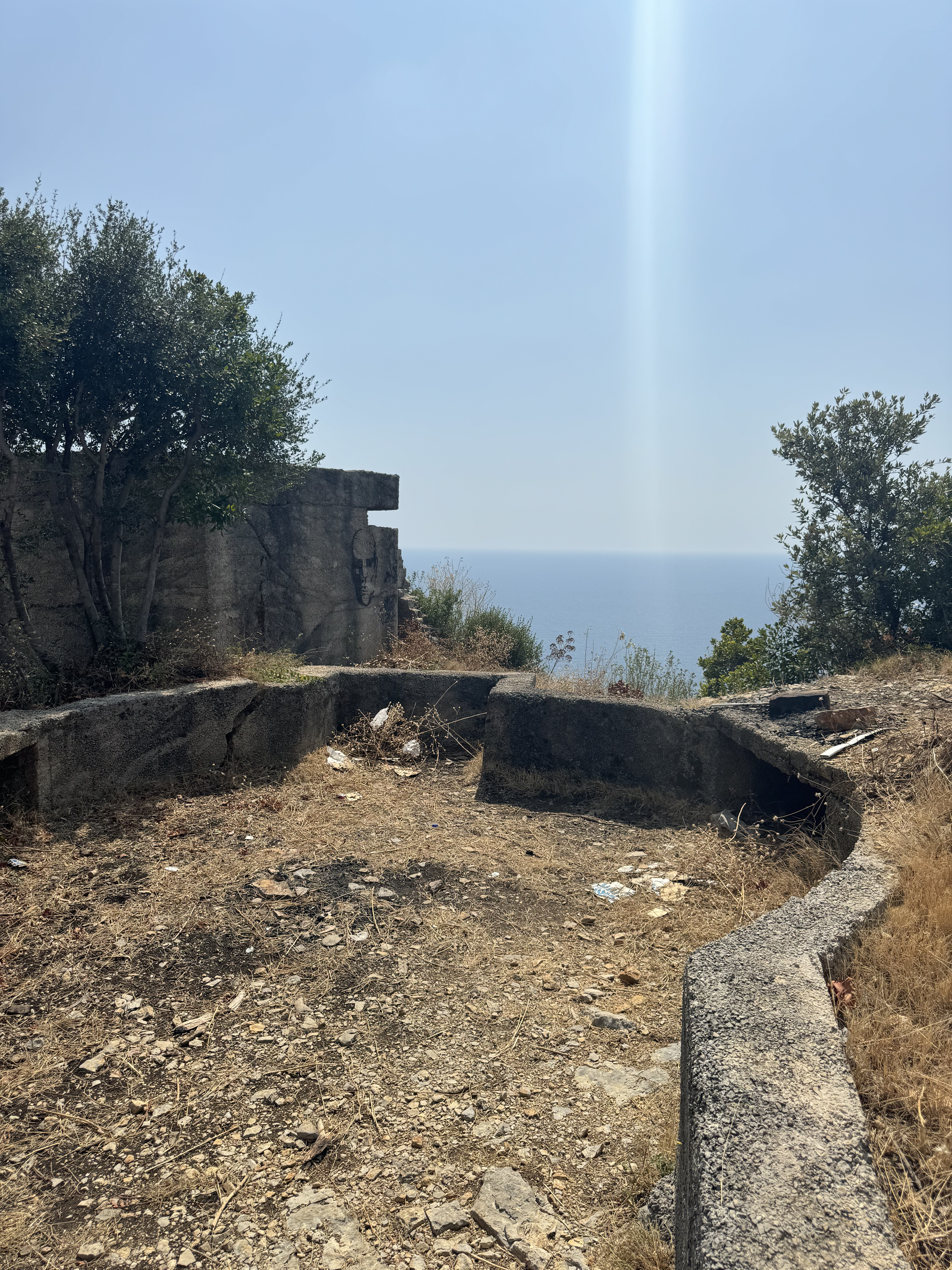
World War II Bunker

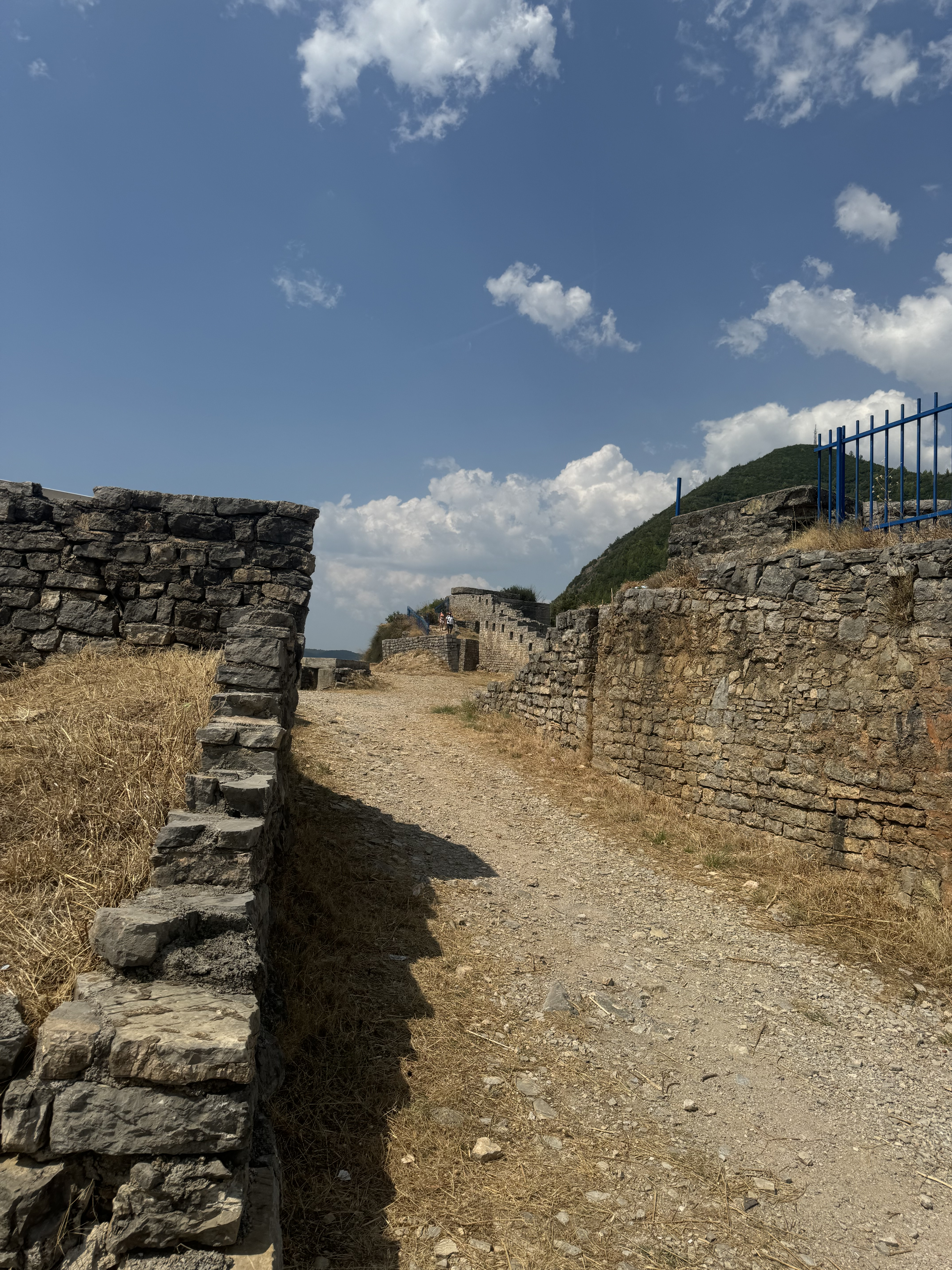
View up from the sea
