= Marko Carević =

Montenegrin businessman and politician

Marko Carević Марко Царевић

Mayor of Budva
- In office 9 January 2019 – 12 August 2022
- Preceded by: Dragan Krapović
- Succeeded by: Milo Božović

Personal details
- Born: 5 April 1966 (age 60) Kotor, SFR Yugoslavia (now Montenegro)
- Party: New Serb Democracy
- Children: 3
- Occupation: Businessman, politician
- Nickname: "Bato"

Marko "Bato" Carević (Serbian Cyrillic: Марко "Бато" Царевић; born 1966) is a Montenegrin politician, businessman and a football executive. He served as the mayor of Budva from 9 January 2019 until 12 August 2022.

== Biography ==
=== Early life ===
He was born on 5 April 1966 in Kotor to a Montenegrin Serb family. He finished middle and high school in Kotor, and later graduated from the Faculty of Economics in Bosnia and Herzegovina.

=== Business career ===
For over 30 years, he has been involved in business and gained a fortune in the construction business. Until recently, he was the director of the "Carinvest" construction company. Carević is a millionaire. He is also the chairman of OFK Grbalj, which finished 6th in the 2018–2019 Montenegrin First League season.

Carević is the richest politician in Montenegro.

=== Political career ===
He is a member of the New Serb Democracy which is a part of the Democratic Front (DF). Following the October 2016 local elections, the DF and the Democrats managed to form a local government in Budva, replacing the Democratic Party of Socialists (DPS) after 25 years in power, against which several corruption proceedings were conducted during the previous term. DF and the Democrats agreed to form a local coalition government, with would see head of the local Democrats Dragan Krapović and Carević serve as Mayor of Budva in a rotation deal for 2 years each. Carević has been serving as the mayor of Budva since 9 January 2019 with his local government under dispute since 17 June 2020. He refused his mayor salary and has been donating his salary money to the people in need. Carević was part of 2019-2020 clerical protests in Montenegro, also one of organizers of many protest walks in his hometown of Budva, at the height of the political crisis and an open conflict between DPS-led government and the Serbian Orthodox Church in Montenegro.

On 11 June 2020, members of the Budva local parliament from the Democratic Party of Socialists, the Montenegrin, and an independent, Stevan Džaković, elected from the 2016 Democratic Front electoral list, have voted to remove Carević from office, however he remained in office, as he claimed that the session was illegal and that he can only be removed from office at the elections, accusing Džaković of betraying the electoral will of voters, as well for political corruption. On 17 June 2020, Special Anti-Terrorist Unit stormed the building of the Municipality of Budva to remove Carević from office. However, Carević resisted and the police arrested him, as well as the President of Assembly of Budva, Krsto Radović (from the Democrats), 4 other members of Democratic Front and the Democrats, as well Carević's brother and his son. Carević was taken to the hospital after getting injured during the arrest, and has left the hospital with a cast on his foot. Police have also blocked the entrance to the city. Vladimir Bulatović (from the Montenegrin) was voted for the acting Mayor of Budva by the new parliamentary majority. The next day, Carević and Radović returned to their offices and they said that the "coup" failed. The decision of the new parliamentary majority on the removal of Carević and Radović and the election of Bulatović and Kuč as acting officials was not recorded in the archives of the Budva parliament because there was no official seal, which Carević said was "in its place, with the elected representative of the people."

On 23 June 2020 the new majority in the local parliament elected a new mayor from the DPS as well as representatives of the Budva local government without the presence of opposition MPs and the media, who were denied access to the session by private security and local police forces. It was accompanied by arrests, police brutality and violence against removed local government officials, parliament deputies and its supporters, as well the return of the DPS to the local government in Budva, a few months prior to the regular local elections. Later that day, Prime Minister Dusko Markovic (DPS) labeled Carević an "unauthorized person blocking institutions", announcing police intervention in Budva, saying "the situation will be resolved in 15 minutes". On 24 June, after police prevented Carević and the other removed opposition-led local authorities from entering the municipal building, and after the entire old local administration was arrested for resisting, there were major riots and clashes between Police Special Unit and protesters supporting Carević and his administration. The police responded violently towards the peaceful protesters, with several police crackdowns taking place, resulting in beatings and arrests, with numerous cases of police abuse of office, brutality and violence against protesting citizens and political activists were reported.

After the convincing victory of his list at the local elections in Budva on 30 August 2020, Marko Carević remains the mayor of Budva, once again disempowering the disputed DPS-led local government in Budva.

=== Personal life ===
He is married, and has two sons and a daughter. One of his sons is a footballer who plays as a goalkeeper for FK Vojvodina, Lazar Carević. He has participated in many humanitarian activities, and financially supported young entrepreneurs.
