= Dragan Krapović =

Montenegrin politician

- Драган Краповић
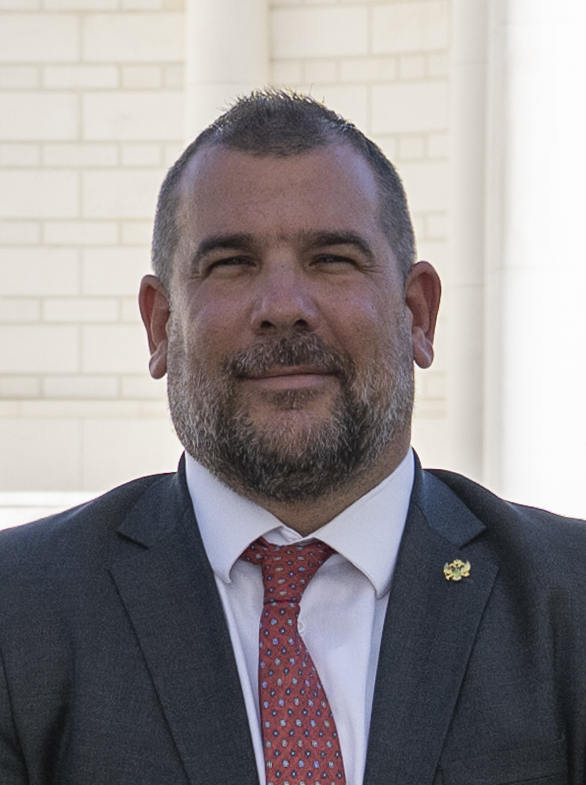
- Krapović in 2025

Member of Parliament
- Incumbent
- Assumed office 30 August 2020

Mayor of Budva
- In office 29 December 2016 – 30 December 2018
- Preceded by: Srđa Popović
- Succeeded by: Marko Carević

Minister of Defence
- Incumbent
- Assumed office 31 October 2023
- Prime Minister: Milojko Spajic

Personal details
- Born: 26 August 1976 (age 50) Titograd, SFR Yugoslavia (now Podgorica, Montenegro)
- Party: Democratic Montenegro
- Children: 3
- Occupation: Economist, politician

Dragan Krapović (Cyrillic: Драган Краповић; born 26 August 1976) is a Montenegrin economist and politician who is currently a Member of Parliament and a vice president of the Democratic Montenegro party. He served as the mayor of Budva from 29 December 2016 until 30 December 2018.

== Biography ==
=== Early life and career ===
Krapović was born in 1978 in Titograd (now Podgorica), which at the time was a part of the Socialist Federal Republic of Yugoslavia. Krapović received a degree from economics.

He worked at Komericijalna banka a.d. Budva in the legal sector. Since 2009, he has been engaged in private business, related to tourism and catering.

=== Political career ===
He is a vice president of the Democratic Montenegro and the president of the Democrats Budva branch. Following the October 2016 local elections, the Democrats and the Democratic Front managed to form a local government in Budva, replacing the Democratic Party of Socialists (DPS) after 25 years in power, against which several corruption proceedings were conducted during the previous term. DF and the Democrats agreed to form a local coalition government, which would see Krapović and Marko Carević serve as Mayor of Budva in a rotation deal for 2 years each. Krapović left office in January 2019 and Carević took over. Krapović was part of 2019-2020 clerical protests in Montenegro at the height of the political crisis and an open conflict between DPS-led government and the Serbian Orthodox Church in Montenegro.

Krapović received 4th position on the electoral list for the 2020 parliamentary elections in which Democrats participated in the coalition called Peace is Our Nation along with Demos. Krapović received the fourth position on the combined electoral list. The election resulted in a victory for the opposition parties and the fall from power of the ruling DPS, which has ruled the country since the introduction of the multi-party system in 1990. The coalition won 12.54% of the popular vote, which equals 10 seats in the parliament and Krapović was elected deputy in the Parliament of Montenegro for the first time.
