= Budva =

Town in the coastal region of Montenegro

Budva Будва
- Town and municipality
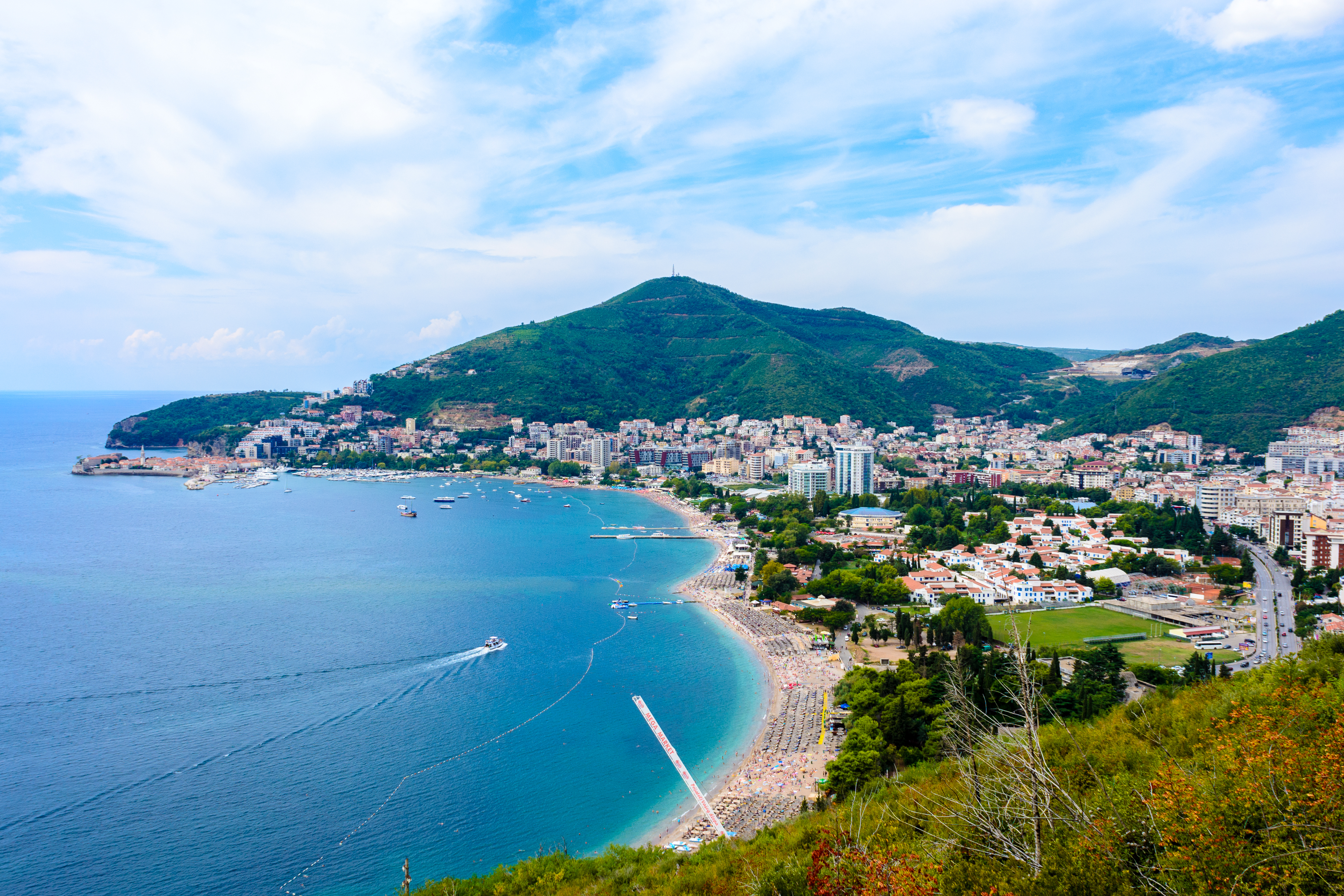
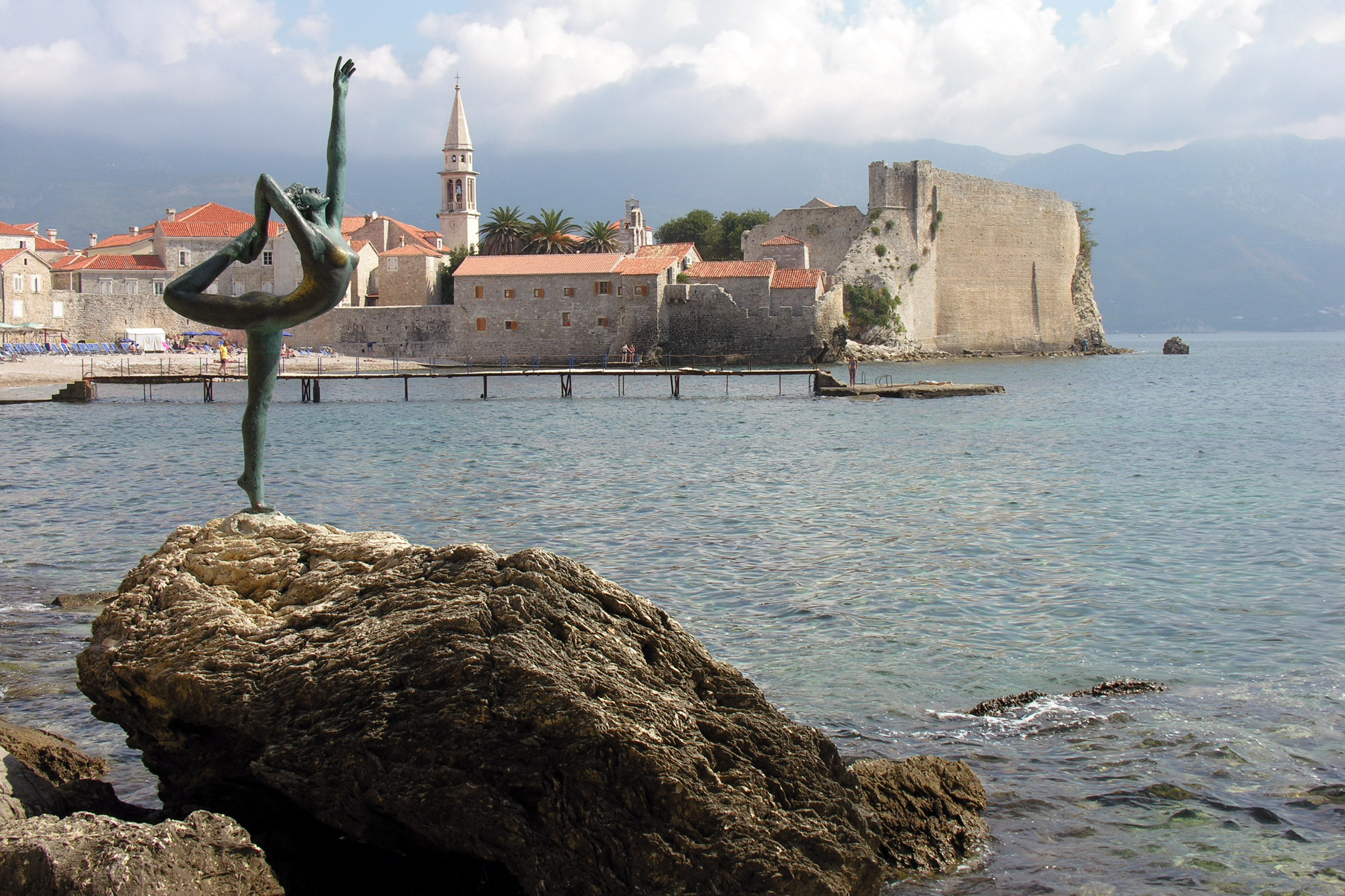
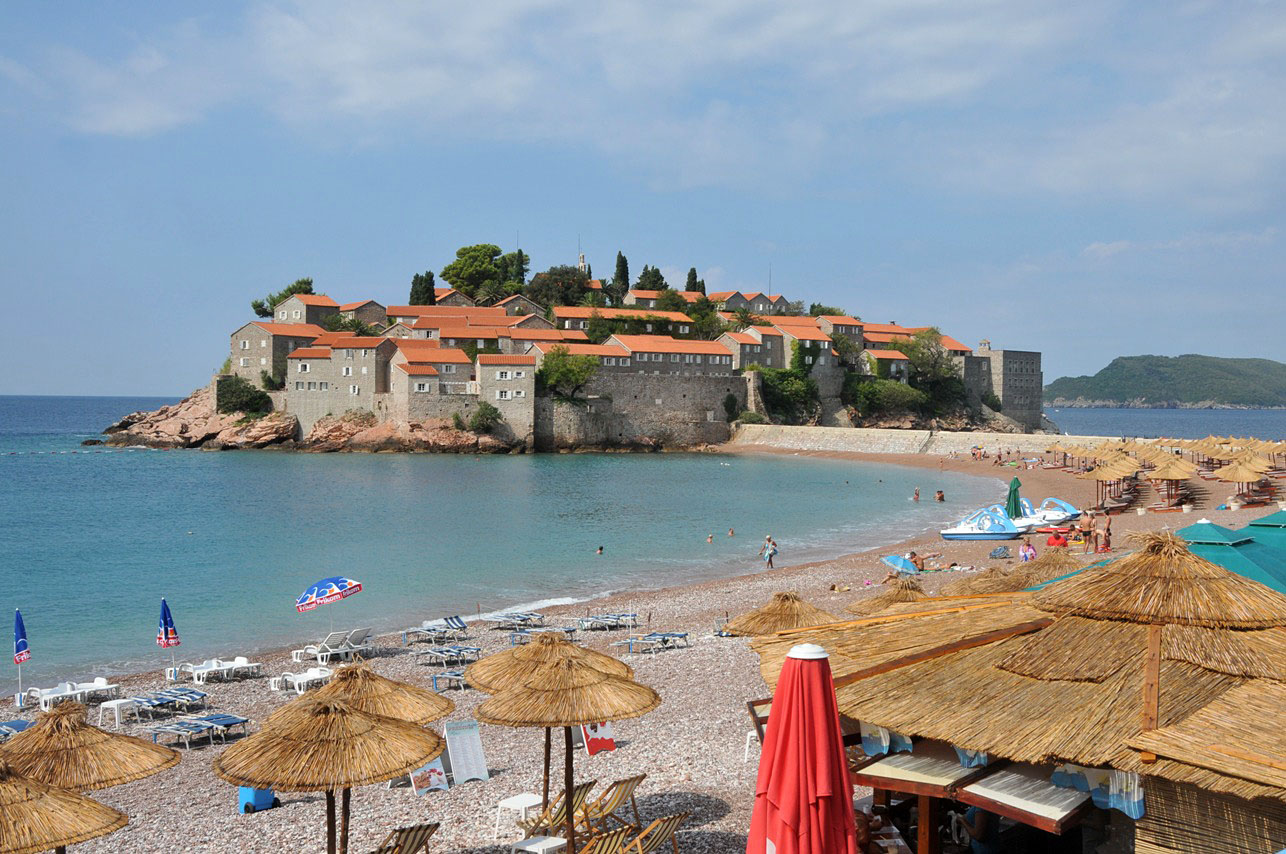
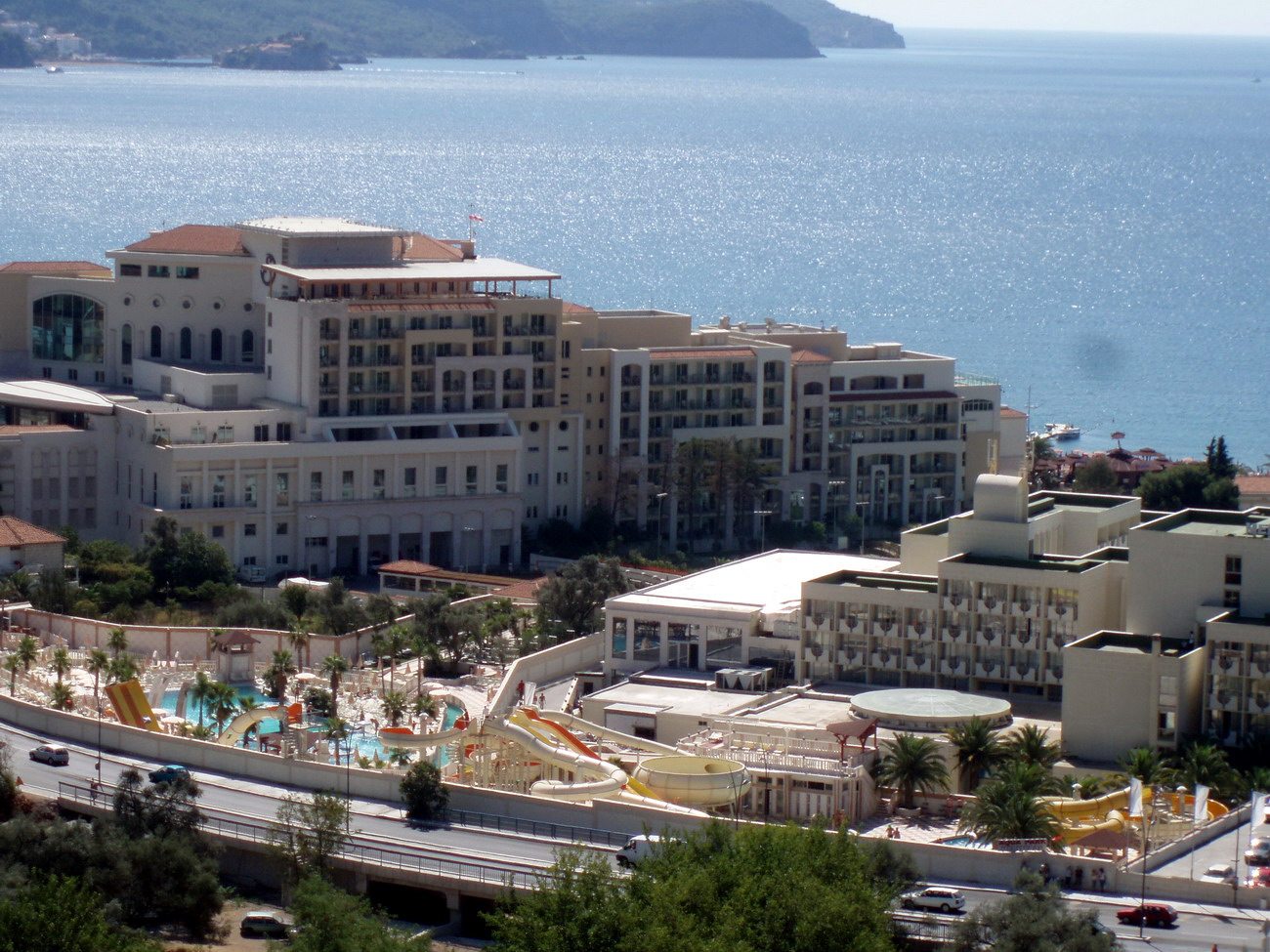
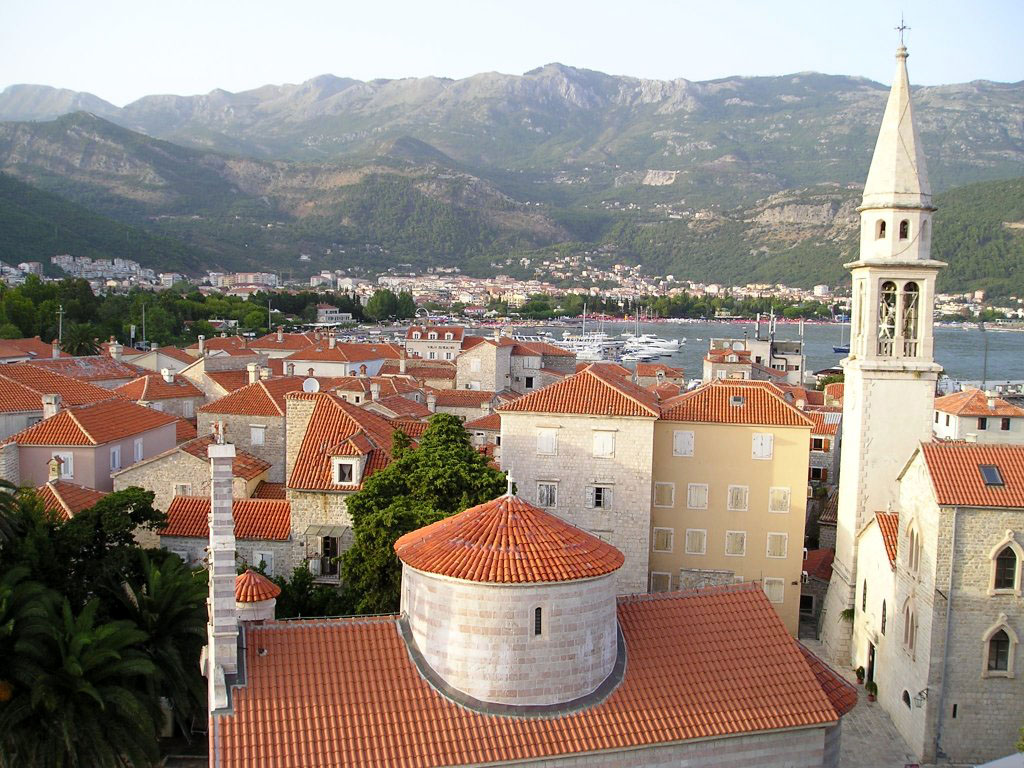
- Budva panoramic view, Dancer statue in front of Old Town, Sveti Stefan island, Bečići and Budva Old Town

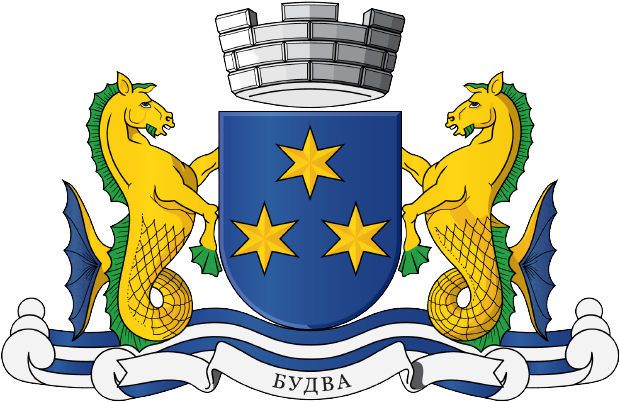
- Flag Coat of arms

- Location within Montenegro
- Coordinates: 42°17′17″N 18°50′33″E
- Country: Montenegro
- Region: Coastal
- Municipality: Budva
- Established: 5th century BC
- Settlements: 33

Government
  - Type: Mayor-Assembly
  - Mayor: Nikola Jovanović (BNG)

Area
  - Town and municipality: 4.2 km^{2} (1.6 sq mi)
  - Metro: 122 km^{2} (47 sq mi)
- Elevation: 3 m (9.8 ft)

Population (2023)
  - Rank: 6th in Montenegro
  - Urban: 17,479 ▲
  - Rural: 9,188 ▲
  - Municipality: 26,667 ▲
- Time zone: UTC+1 (CET)
  - Summer (DST): UTC+2 (CEST)
- Postal code: 85310
- Area code: +382 33
- ISO 3166-2 code: ME-05
- Vehicle registration: BD
- Patron saint: Saint John
- Climate: Csa
- Website: budva.me

Budva (Montenegrin Cyrillic: Будва, pronounced [bûːdv̞a] or [bûdv̞a]) is a town in the Coastal region of Montenegro. It had 17,479 inhabitants as of 2023, and is the centre of Budva Municipality. The coastal area around Budva, known as the Budva Riviera, is the center of Montenegrin tourism, renowned for its well-preserved medieval walled city, sandy beaches, and diverse nightlife. Budva is 2,500 years old, which makes it one of the oldest settlements on the Adriatic coast.

== Etymology ==
In Serbo-Croatian, the town is known as Будва or Budva; in Italian and Latin as Budua; in Albanian as Budua, and in (classical/ancient) Greek as Bouthoe (Βουθόη) and Butua (Βουτούα).

== History ==
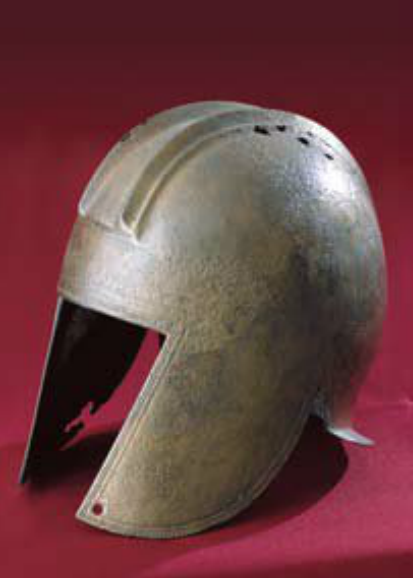
Illyrian helmet from Budva (4th century BC)

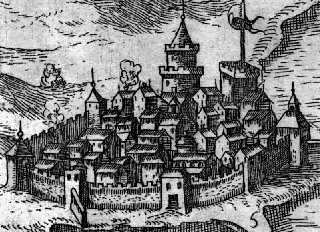
The Old town in 1615.

A legend recounts that Bouthoe (Βουθόη - Bouthoē) was founded by Cadmus, the founder of Thebes, Greece. When exiled from Thebes, he found a shelter in this place for himself and his wife, the goddess Harmonia.

The first record of Budva dates back to the 5th century BC. Originally, the site belonged to the state of Illyria. In the 6th century BC, during the Greek colonization of the Adriatic, a Greek emporium was established. In the 2nd century BC, the area of Budva became part of the Roman Republic and from 27 BC, of the Roman Empire. Upon the fall of the Empire and its division into east and west, the defensive barrier that separated the two powers happened to run across this area, subsequently making a lasting impact on the history and culture of this town.

In the 6th century, Budva was part of the Byzantine Empire, and in the following two centuries, Slavs and, to a lesser extent, Avars began to arrive in the area, mixing with the native Roman population. Budva bay was reportedly known as Avarorum sinus (Avar bay') during the Avar incursions. In 841, Budva was sacked by Muslim Saracens, who devastated the area.

In the early Middle Ages, Budva was ruled by a succession of Doclean kings, as well as Serbian and Zetan aristocrats.

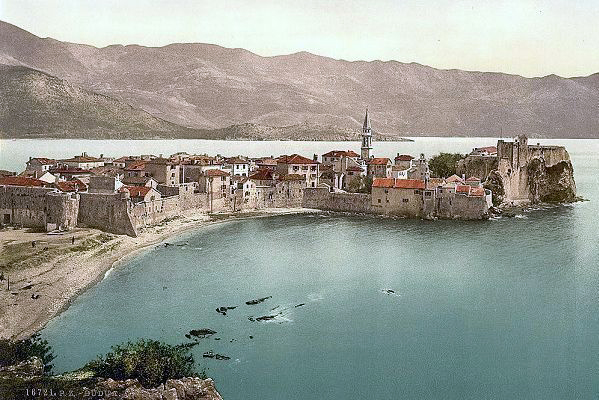
The Venetian walls of Budua (Budva) on a 1900 postcard

c. 1200, it became the see of a Roman Catholic Diocese of Budua, which lasted until 1828 and was nominally revived as a Latin titular bishopric. It was controlled by the Balšić family for some decades and was shortly controlled by the Albanian Zaharia family in the 14th century. The Venetians ruled the town for nearly 400 years, from 1420 to 1797. Budva, called Budua in those centuries, was part of the Albania Veneta and was fortified by powerful Venetian walls against Ottoman conquests. According to the historian Luigi Paulucci in his book "Le Bocche di Cattaro nel 1810" (The Bay of Kotor in 1810), most of the population spoke the Venetian language until the beginning of the 19th century. One of the most renowned theater librettists and composers, Cristoforo Ivanovich, was born in Venetian Budua. Nevertheless, Budva was briefly under Ottoman rule between 1572 and 1573 due to the conquest by Occhiali. It was returned to the Venetians under the conditions of the Treaty of Constantinople (1573). In 1675, a French Archaeologist, Jacob Spon, visited Budva and stated that Budva is like a border between Albanians and Venetians.

With the fall of the Republic of Venice in 1797, Budva came under the rule of the Habsburg monarchy. During the Napoleonic Wars, Montenegrin forces allied with Russia took control over the city in 1806, only to relinquish the city to France in 1807. French rule lasted until 1813, when Budva (along with Boka Kotorska) was ceded to the Austrian Empire, which remained in control of the city for the next 100 years.

A union of Boka Kotorska (and Budva) with Montenegro took place for a brief period (1813–1814), but from 1814 until the end of World War I in 1918, Budva remained under Austria-Hungary. The southernmost fortress in the Austro-Hungarian Empire, Fort Kosmač, was constructed nearby to guard the road from Budva to Cetinje. After the war, the Serbian army entered Budva after it was abandoned by Austrian forces, and it came under the Kingdom of Yugoslavia.

In 1941, with the beginning of World War II, Budva was annexed by the Kingdom of Italy. Budva was finally liberated from Axis rule on 22 November 1944 and incorporated into the Socialist Republic of Montenegro (which was a part of the Socialist Federal Republic of Yugoslavia).

A catastrophic earthquake struck Budva on 15 April 1979. Much of the old town was devastated, but today there is little evidence of the catastrophe – almost all the buildings were restored to their original form.

Montenegro became an independent country in 2006, with Budva as its primary tourist destination.

In 2022, the city became the center of Ukrainian, Russian, and Turkish immigrants in Montenegro after the Russian invasion of Ukraine, resulting in a sharp population increase.

=== City Assembly (2024–2028) ===
| Party/Coalition | Seats | Local government |
|---|---|---|
| BND | 9 / 33 | Government |
| DPS | 7 / 33 | Support |
| ZBCG (NSD–DNP) | 6 / 33 | Opposition |
| DCG | 2 / 33 | Opposition |
| SDP | 2 / 33 | Government |
| PzG | 2 / 33 | Opposition |
| SNP | 2 / 33 | Opposition |
| PES | 1 / 33 | Opposition |
| URA | 1 / 33 | Government |
| NB | 1 / 33 | Opposition |

=== Mayor ===
The Mayor of Budva is the head of the town and Municipality of Budva. He acts on behalf of the Town, and performs an executive function in the Municipality of Budva. The current mayor is Nikola Jovanović.

List of Mayors since Montenegrin independence (2006–present):

- Rajko Kuljača (DPS) (2006–2010, arrested)
- Lazar Rađenović (DPS) (2010–2015, arrested)
- Srđa Popović (DPS) (2015–2016)
- Dragan Krapović (Democrats) (2016–2019)
- Marko Carević (DF) (2019–2020)
- Nikola Divanović (DPS) (2020, disputed)
- Marko Carević (DF) (2020–2022)
- Milo Božović (DF) (2022–2025, arrested)
- Nikola Jovanović (BNG) (2025–present)

== Demographics ==
Budva is the administrative centre of Budva municipality, which includes the neighbouring towns of Bečići and Petrovac, and has a population of 19,218 (2011 census). The town itself has 13,338 inhabitants.

=== Ethnicity ===
Source: Statistical Office of Montenegro - MONSTAT, Census 2011

| Ethnicity | Number | Percentage |
|---|---|---|
| Montenegrins | 6,847 | 51.33% |
| Serbs | 4,779 | 35.82% |
| Russians | 132 | 0.98% |
| Croats | 130 | 0.97% |
| Bosniaks | 95 | 0.71% |
| ethnic Muslims | 72 | 0.53% |
| Albanians | 65 | 0.48% |
| Macedonians | 54 | 0.4% |
| Romani | 7 | 0.05% |
| Other | 126 | 0.94% |
| not declared | 765 | 5.73% |
| Total | 13,338 | 100% |

Source: Statistical Office of Montenegro - MONSTAT, Census 2011

| Religion (2011 Census) | Number |
|---|---|
| Eastern Orthodoxy | 11,865 |
| Islam | 340 |
| Catholicism | 304 |
| Christians | 54 |
| Protestants | 7 |
| Buddhist | 6 |
| Adventist | 26 |
| Agnosticism | 15 |
| Atheism | 236 |
| Undeclared | 403 |
| Other | 82 |

== Cityscape ==
=== Old Town ===
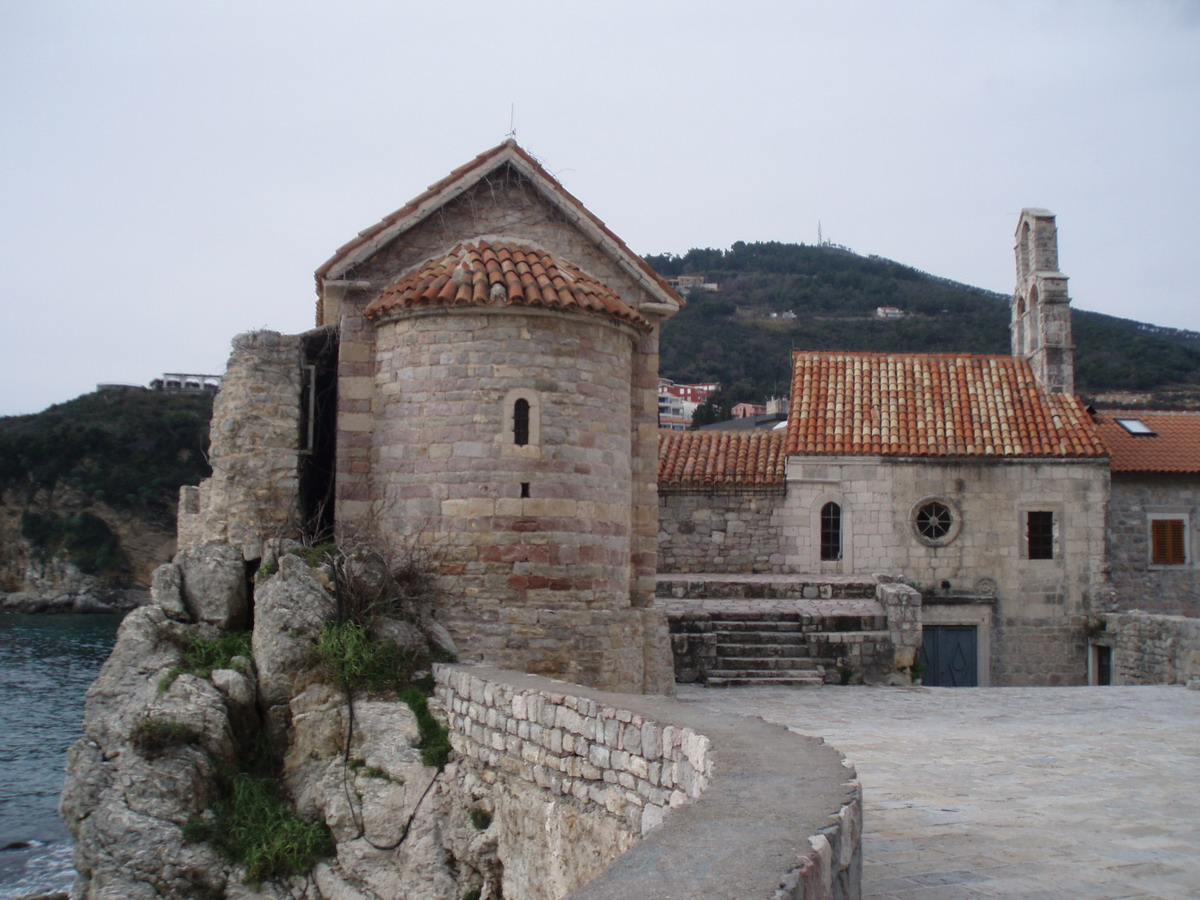
Churches in Old Town

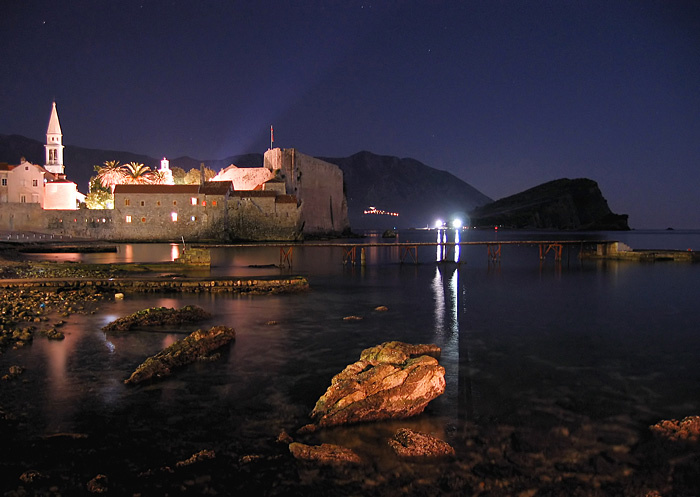
Old Town by night

The Old Town of Budva is situated on a rocky peninsula, on the southern end of Budva field. Archaeological evidence suggests that an Illyrian settlement was established on the site of the Old Town before Greek colonization of the Adriatic. While the site was permanently settled since the Roman era, most of the remaining city walls and buildings were erected during the Venetian rule.

The entire town is encircled with defensive stone walls. The fortifications of Budva are typical of the Medieval walled cities of the Adriatic, complete with towers, embrasures, fortified city gates, and a citadel.

Originally, there were gates on all of the four sides of the walled city. However, sea-facing gates were closed up over the years. The main city gate is Porta di Terra Ferma, the grand entry to the city from the west. It is also the beginning of the city's main thoroughfare, Njegoševa Street. There are also four more gates on the north wall, facing Budva marina (Porta Pizana, Porta Pizana 1 and 2, and Porta Pizanella), and one small gate facing the southwestern beach of Ričardova glava.

The layout of the town is roughly orthogonal, although many streets deviate from the grid, resulting in somewhat irregular pattern, with many piazzas connected with narrow streets. Today, the entire city within the walls is pedestrian-only.

The town citadel is situated on the southern tip of the city. Originally known as the Castle of St Mary, the fortification was continually rebuilt and expanded through the Middle Ages, reaching its final form during the Austro-Hungarian rule. The sea-facing 160m long ramparts of the citadel, complete with eastern and western towers, are intricately connected to the rest of the city walls. Austrian stone barracks form the most prominent structure within the castle, separating the citadel from the rest of the walled city. Ruins of the Santa Maria de Castello church, after which the entire complex was originally named, are located within the citadel.

A large public square is located to the north of the citadel, containing all of the churches of the old town - St. Ivan Church (17th century), Santa Maria in Punta Church (840 AD), St Sava Orthodox Church (12th century), and The Holy Trinity Orthodox church (1804).

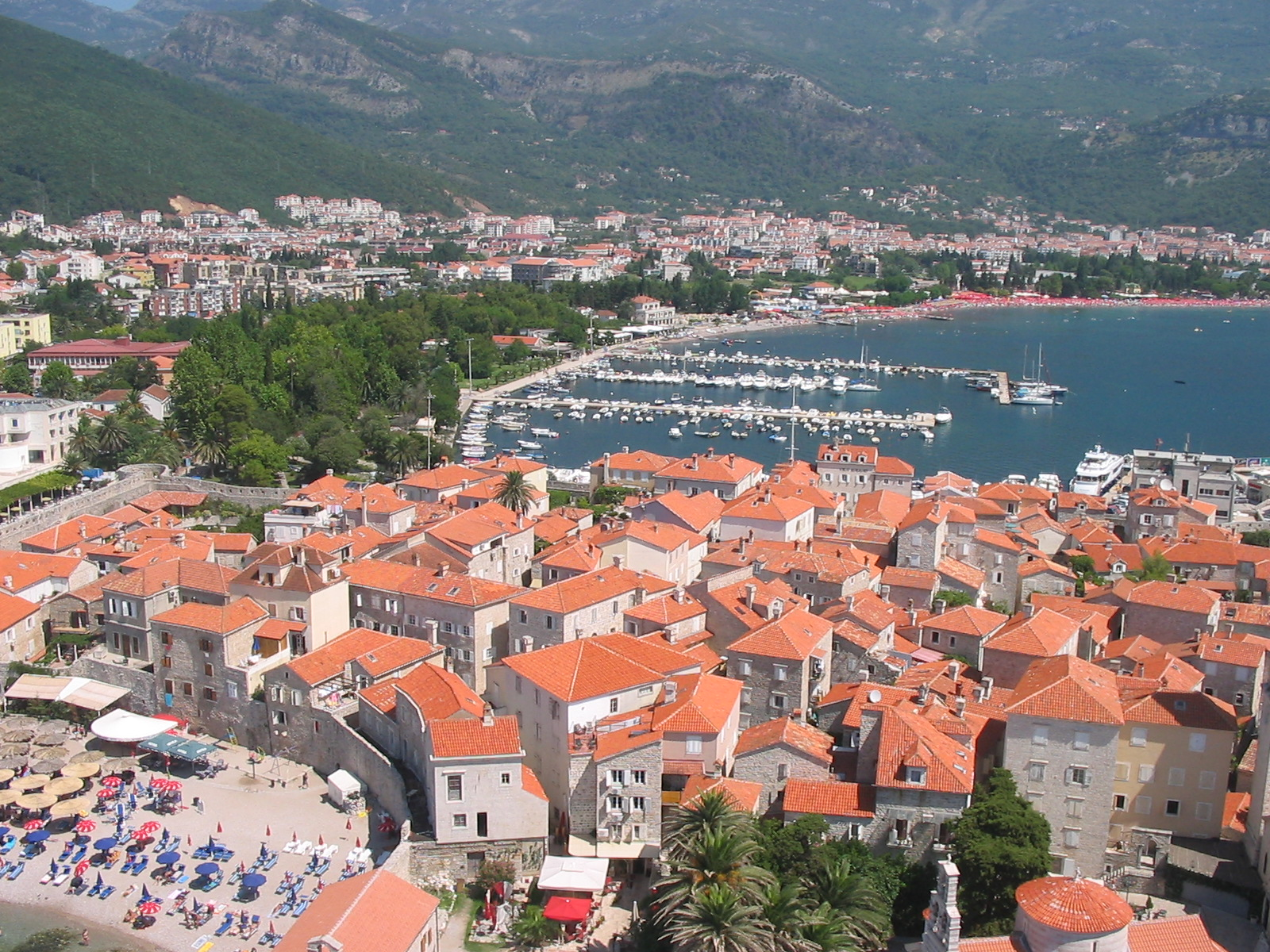

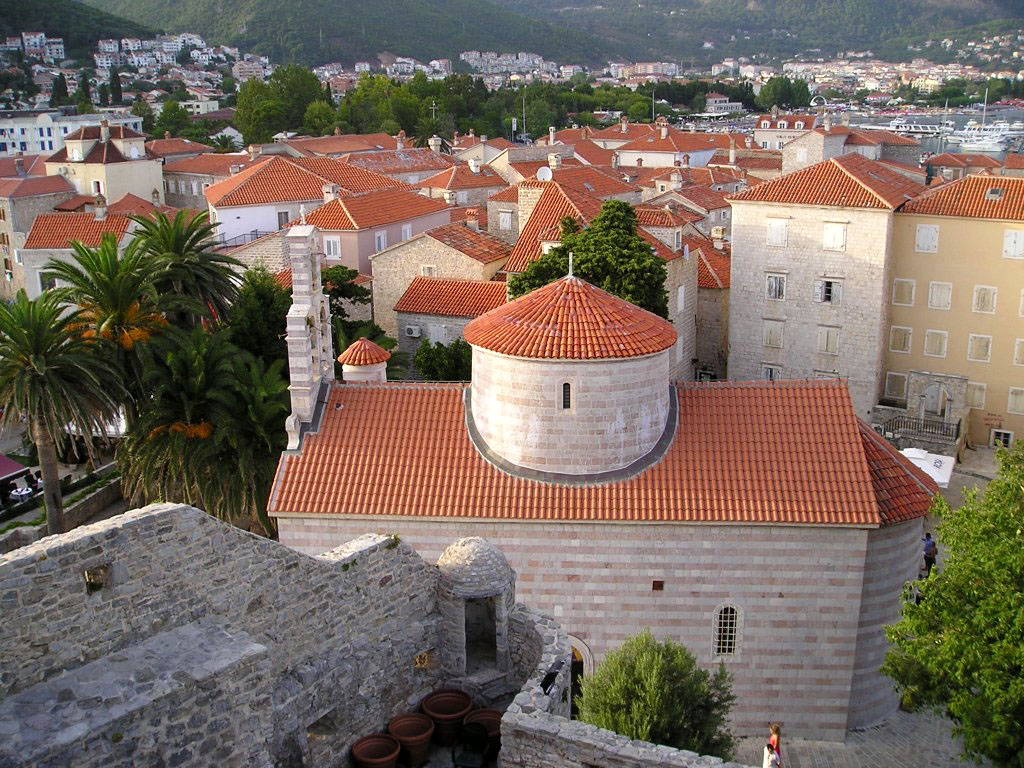

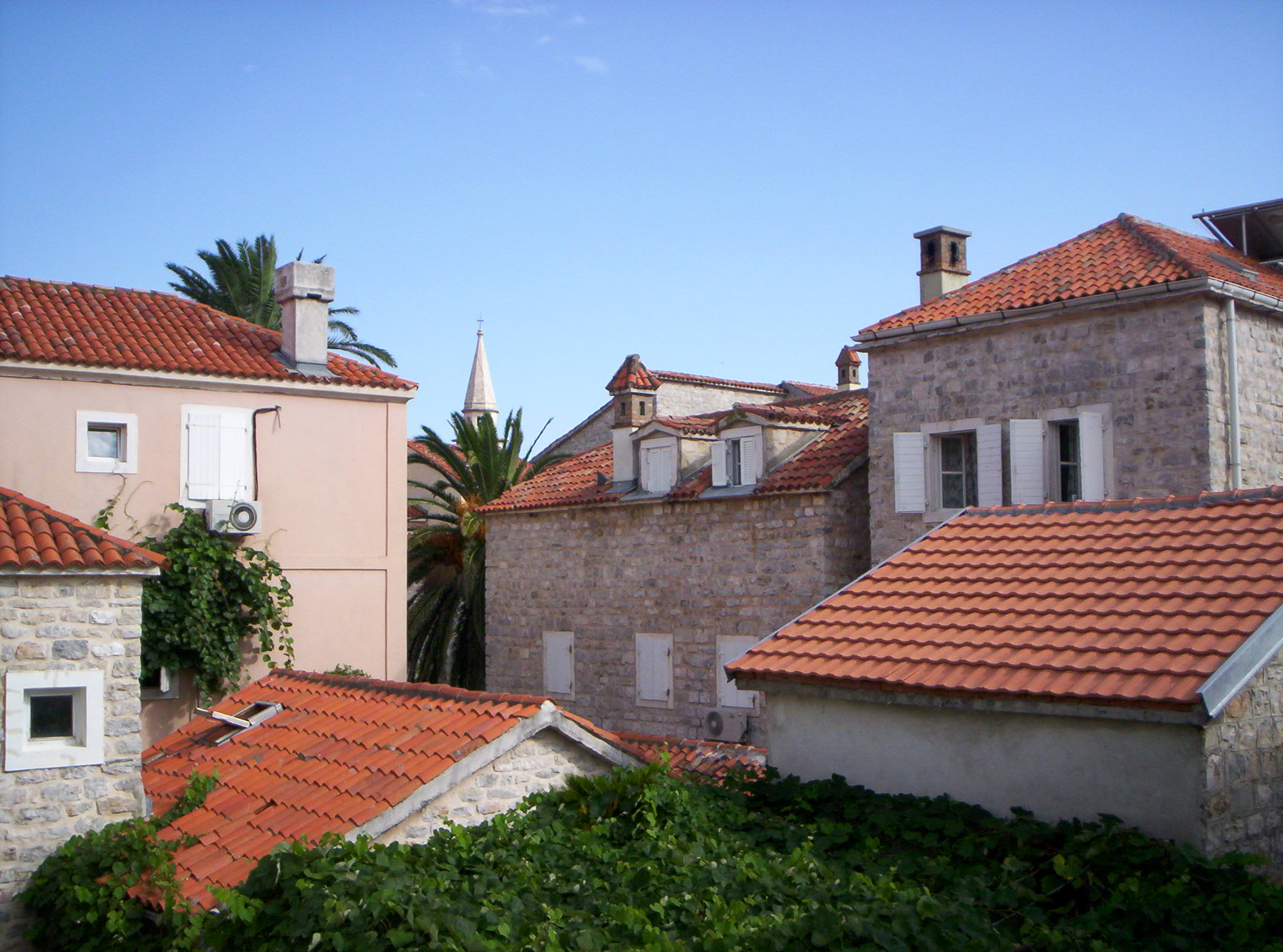

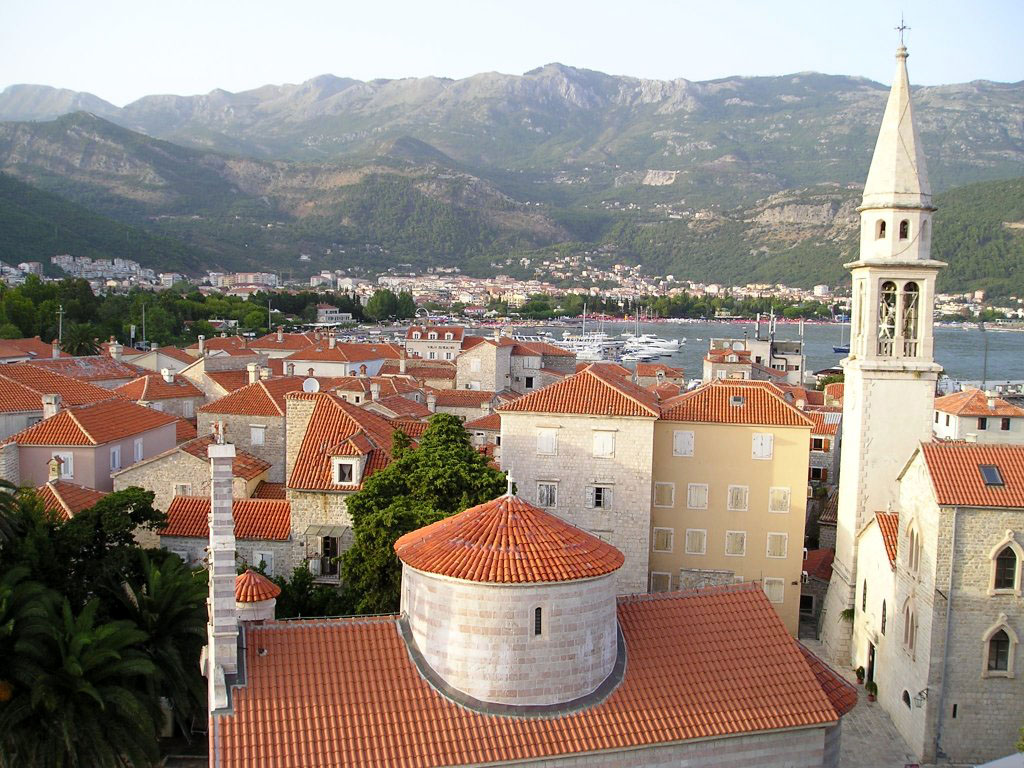

The Old Town suffered extensive damage in 1979 earthquake; repair and reconstruction took eight years (until 1987), but traces of the damage are now hardly noticeable. Today, it is a prime visitor attraction of Budva, packed with tourists during the summer months. Its narrow cobbled streets are lined with restaurants, cafes, pubs and shops.

=== Outside the Old Town ===
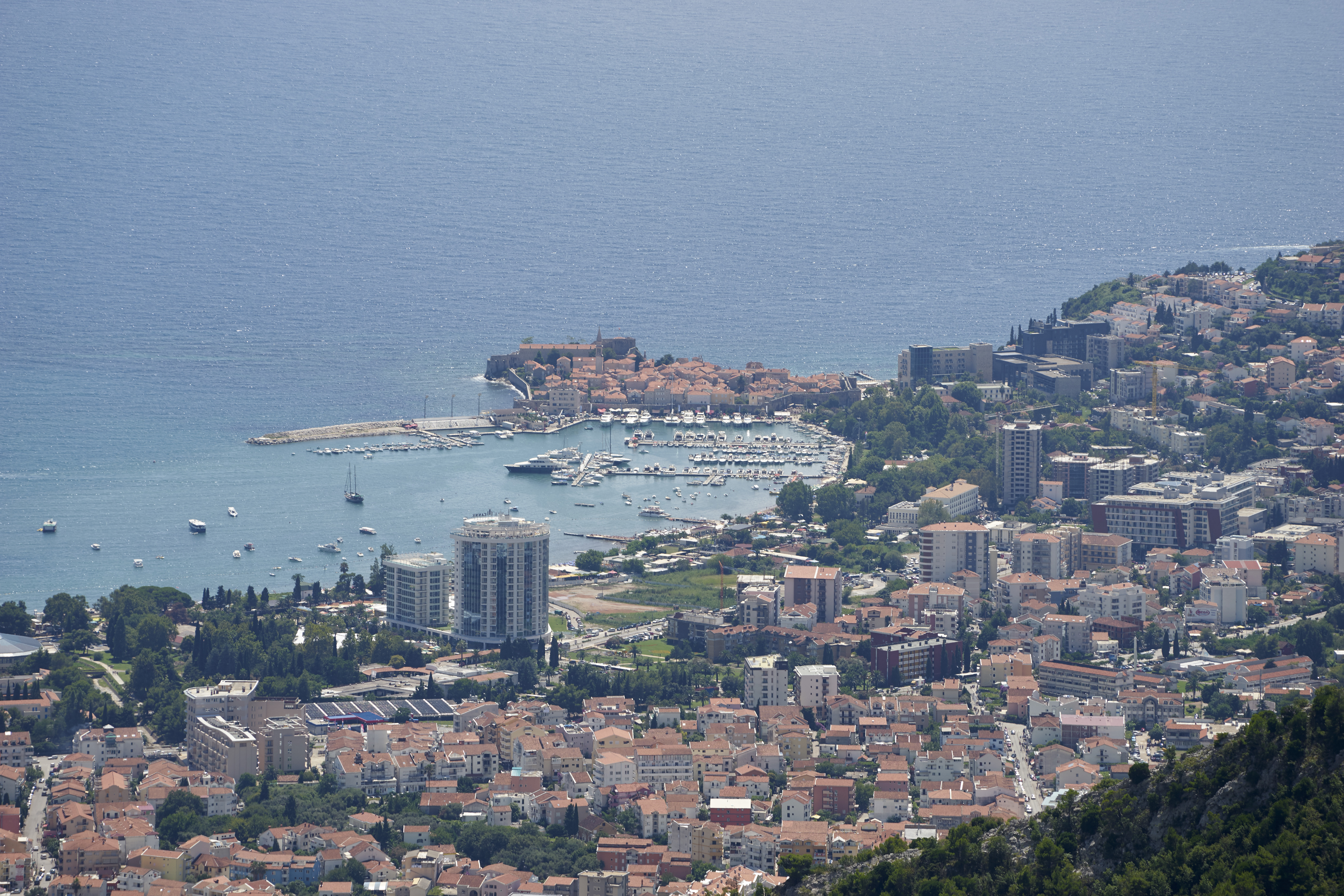
Budva mountain view

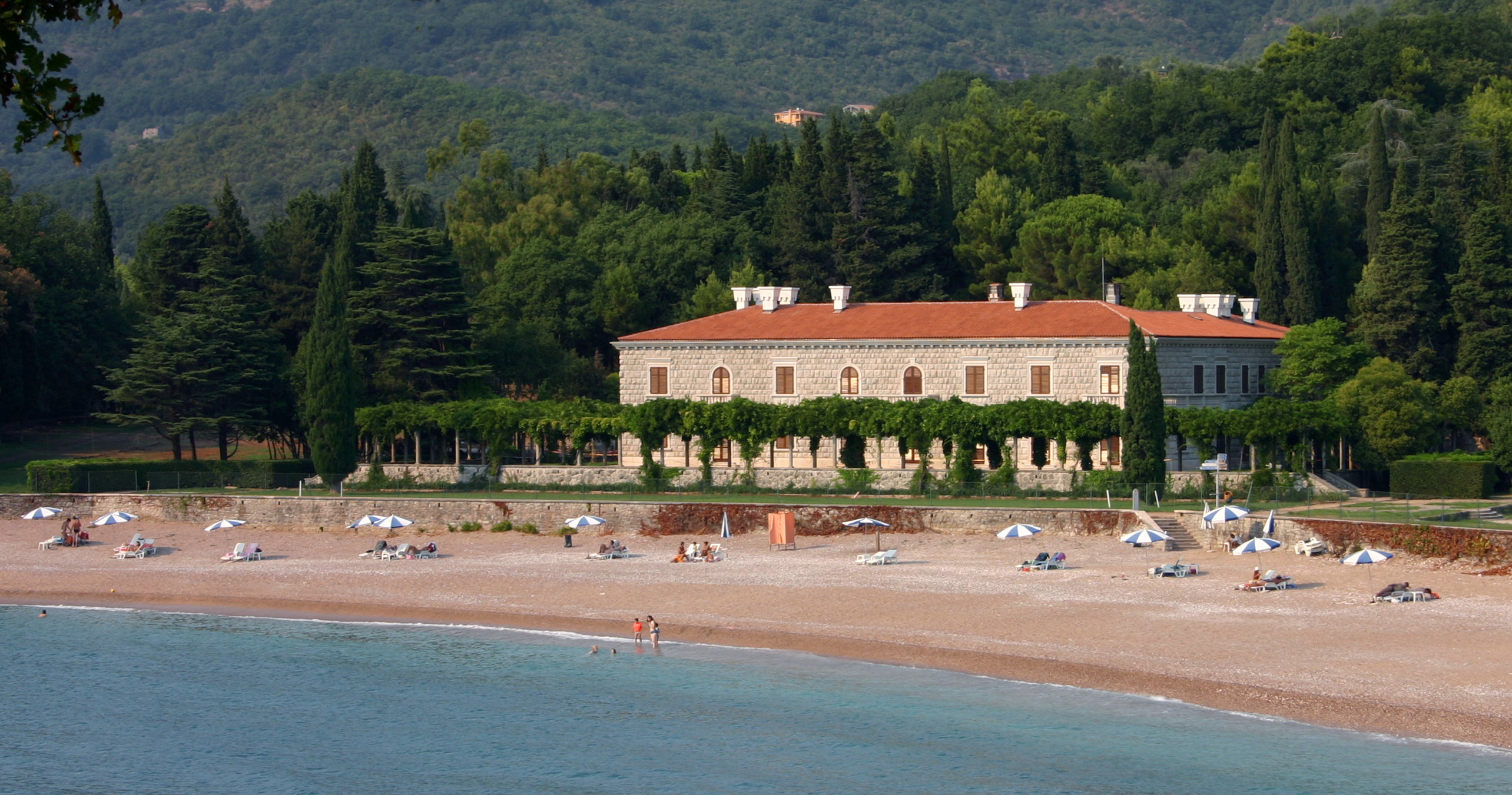
Miločer

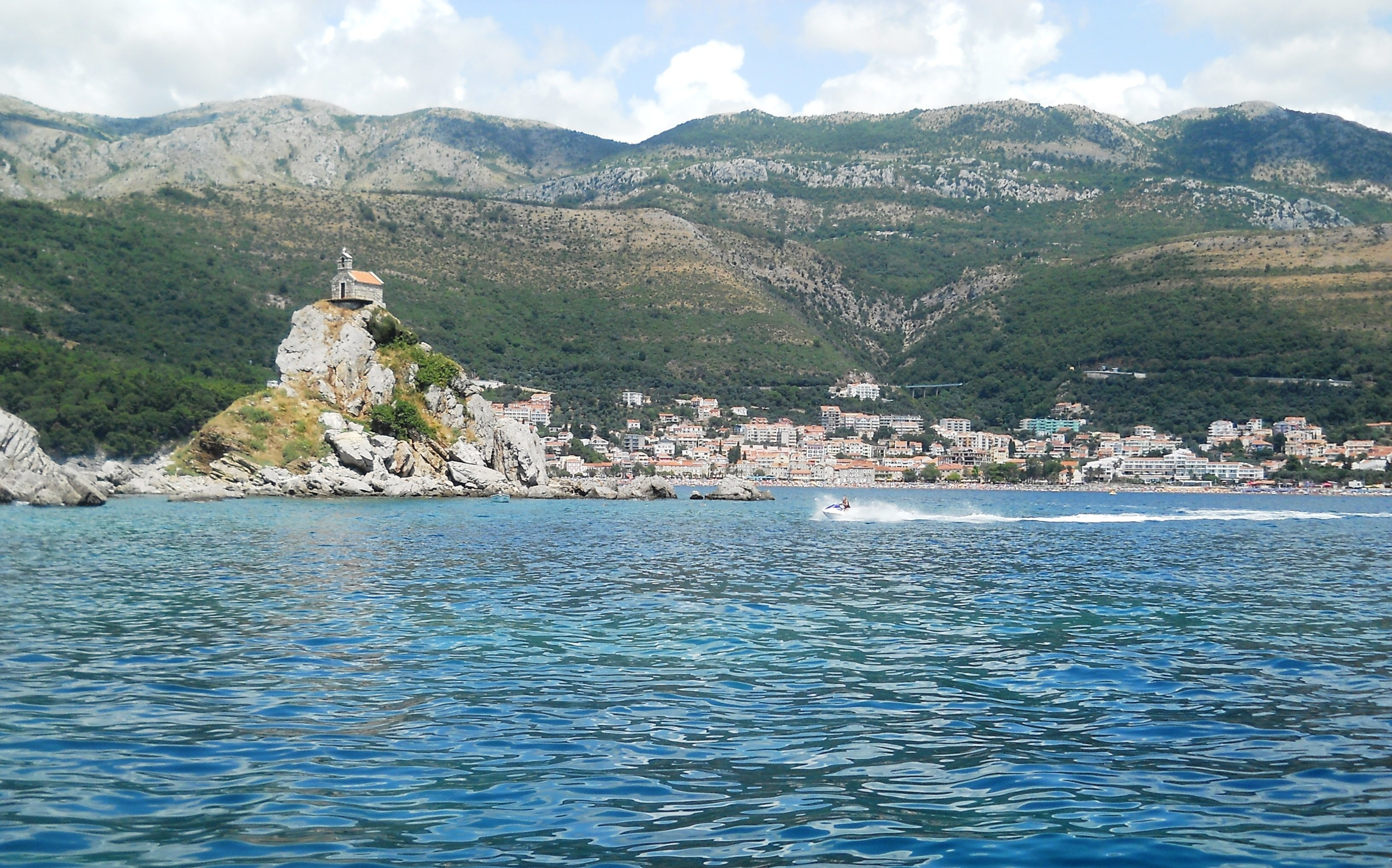
Petrovac

Although confined to the walls of the Old Town for most of its history, Budva started significant expansion into the adjacent Budva field in the 20th century, with the development of the tourism industry. Hotels started springing up near the Old Town and to the west of it, along the 1600m long Slovenska beach, including the landmark Avala hotel (built in 1939), the Mogren hotel, and the Slovenska plaža hotel complex (built in 1984). Development near the Old Town and along the longest city beach was done in a planned and sustainable manner, with parts of Budva built in the SFRY having all the characteristics of a well-organized resort town. Most of the hotels and facilities built during this period are situated to the south of the town's main traffic artery, a portion of Adriatic Highway (E65/E80) that crosses the city parallel to the Slovenska plaža beach.

However, the rest of the Budva field, to the north of the Adriatic Highway, developed in a less uniform manner. The western part of Budva field, containing a civic center (an area featuring local government offices, schools, sports center, police and fire station, health center and bus station), Rozino, Dubovica, and Golubovina neighbourhoods, was developed relatively in accordance with principles of urban planning.

In contrast, the eastern part of the Budva field and the slopes of the hills surrounding it saw the emergence of the chaotic urban sprawl. Spontaneous growth began in the late 1980s and early 1990s, as a combination of high demand and inability of the state to enforce urban planning, as the Breakup of Yugoslavia took place. This trend continued into the 2000s, with prices of real estate skyrocketing following Montenegrin independence. Overwhelming demand, fueled by the influx of foreign capital (in large part from Russia), meant that all the undeveloped lots in the Budva field and surrounding hills were quickly being turned into construction sites. Local and state authorities have failed to keep up with the developers, resulting in the unfortunate lack of urban planning in much of the area. Thus, large parts of Budva are connected with an irregular grid of narrow streets, and have overall inadequate infrastructure. This trend continues even today, with limited land forcing developers to turn to building towering high rises in place of small detached residences that made up for majority of Budva field in the early 1990s.

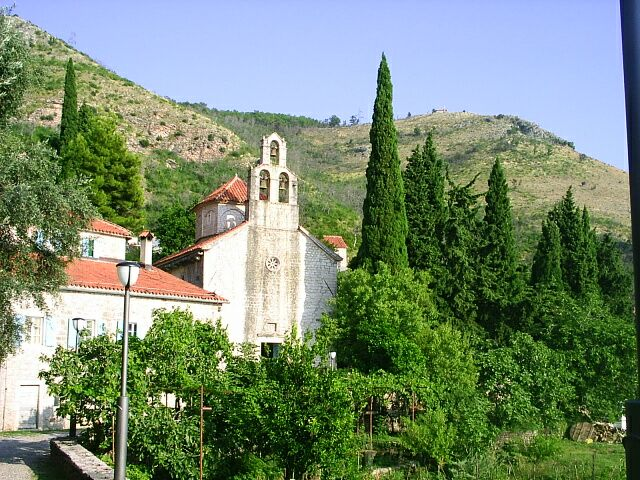
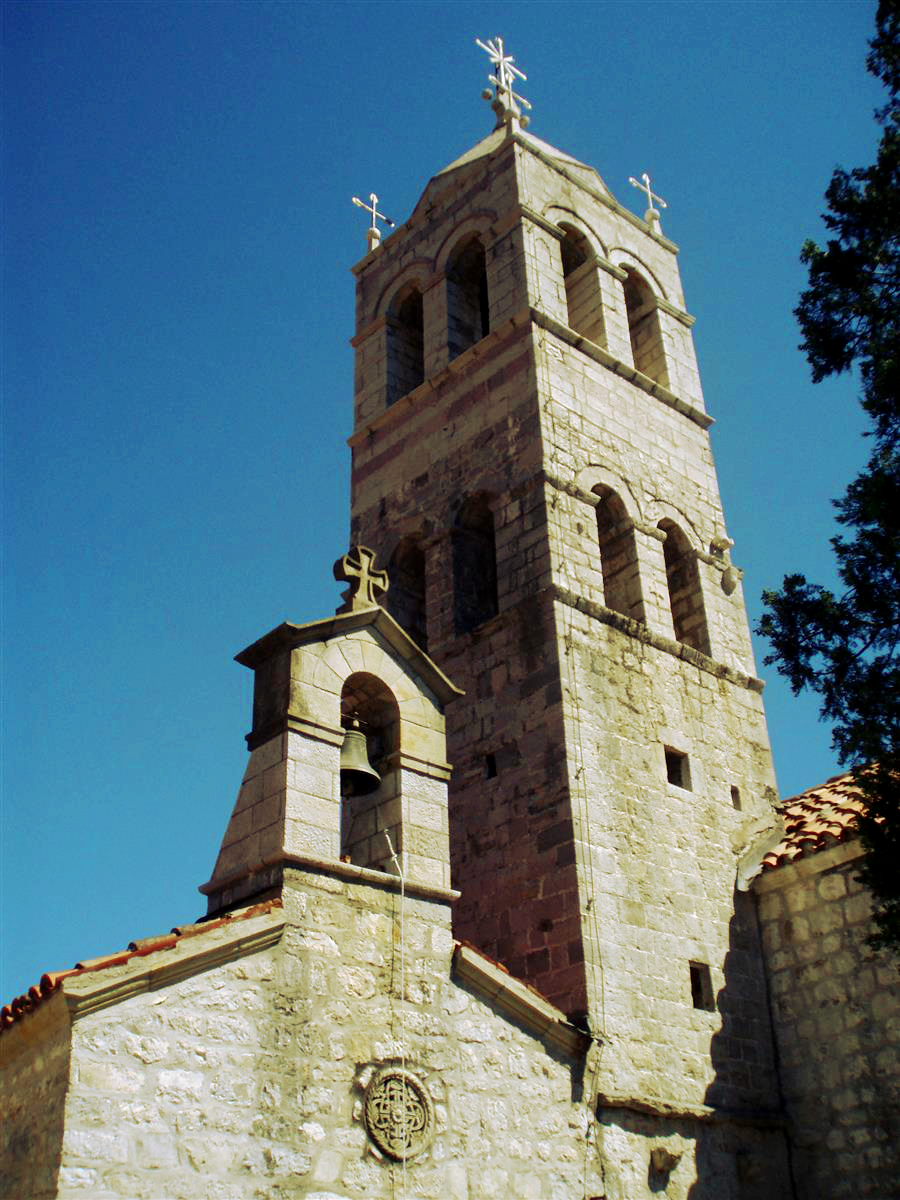
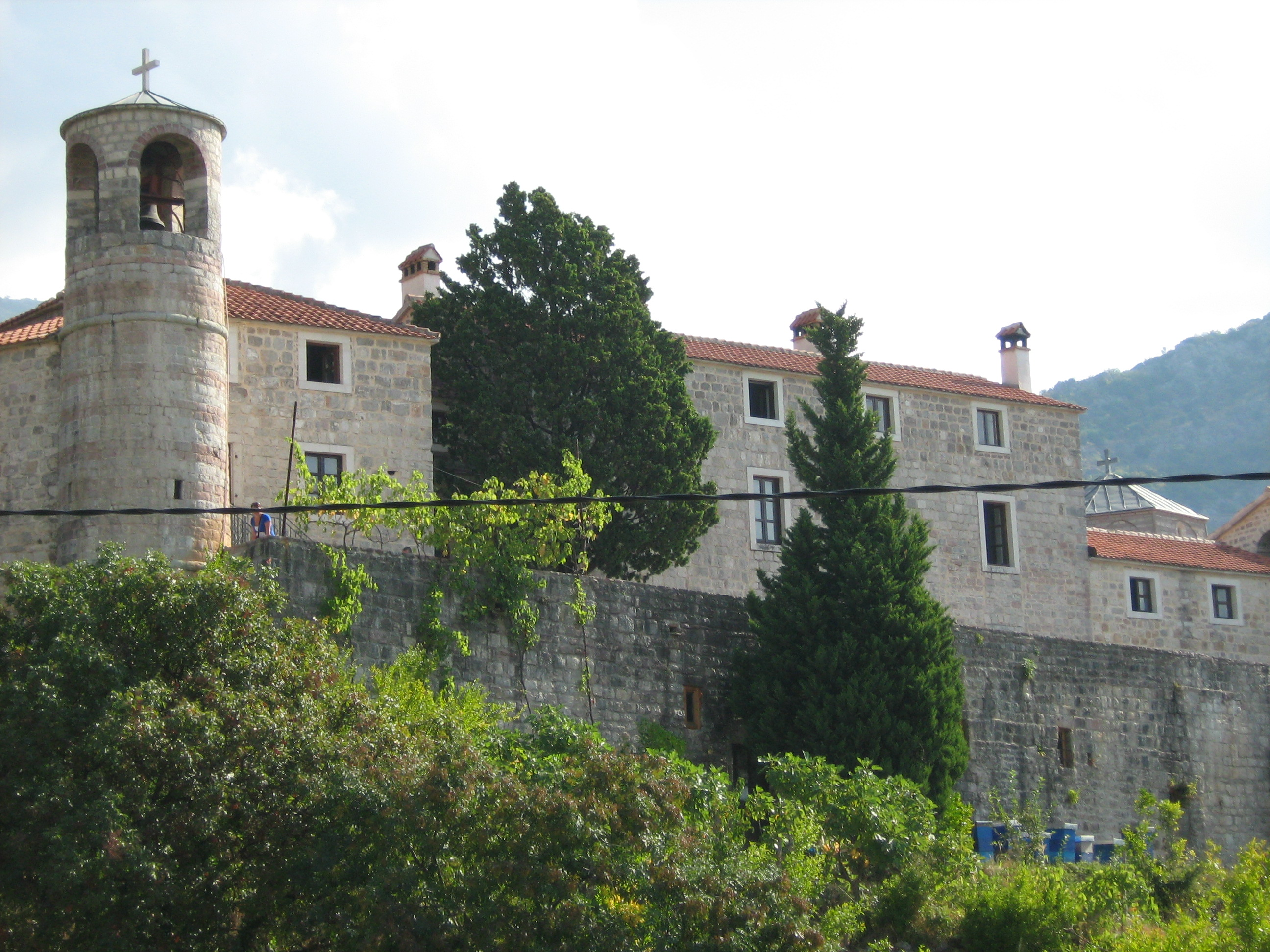
Left: Praskvica Monastery, Centre: Reževići Monastery, Right: Podmaine Monastery

The pressures of the real estate market and neglect of urban planning have resulted in a chronic and severe lack of parking spaces and frequent traffic jams during the summer. Even the water and electricity supply have failed to keep up with the explosive growth in the 2000s, but those issues have since been addressed.

A testament to the urban sprawl, the city bypass (Obilaznica, a crescent road that circles the northern ends of Budva field, with ends connecting to the Adriatic Highway) is a bypass only in name, as it is now a busy urban street, swallowed by the city's expanding urban area.

The term Budvanizacija ("Budvanization") has been used regionally to denote a form of chaotic and massive urban growth, tailored to the needs of individual land owners and developers, without regard for sustainability or environment.

== Tourism ==
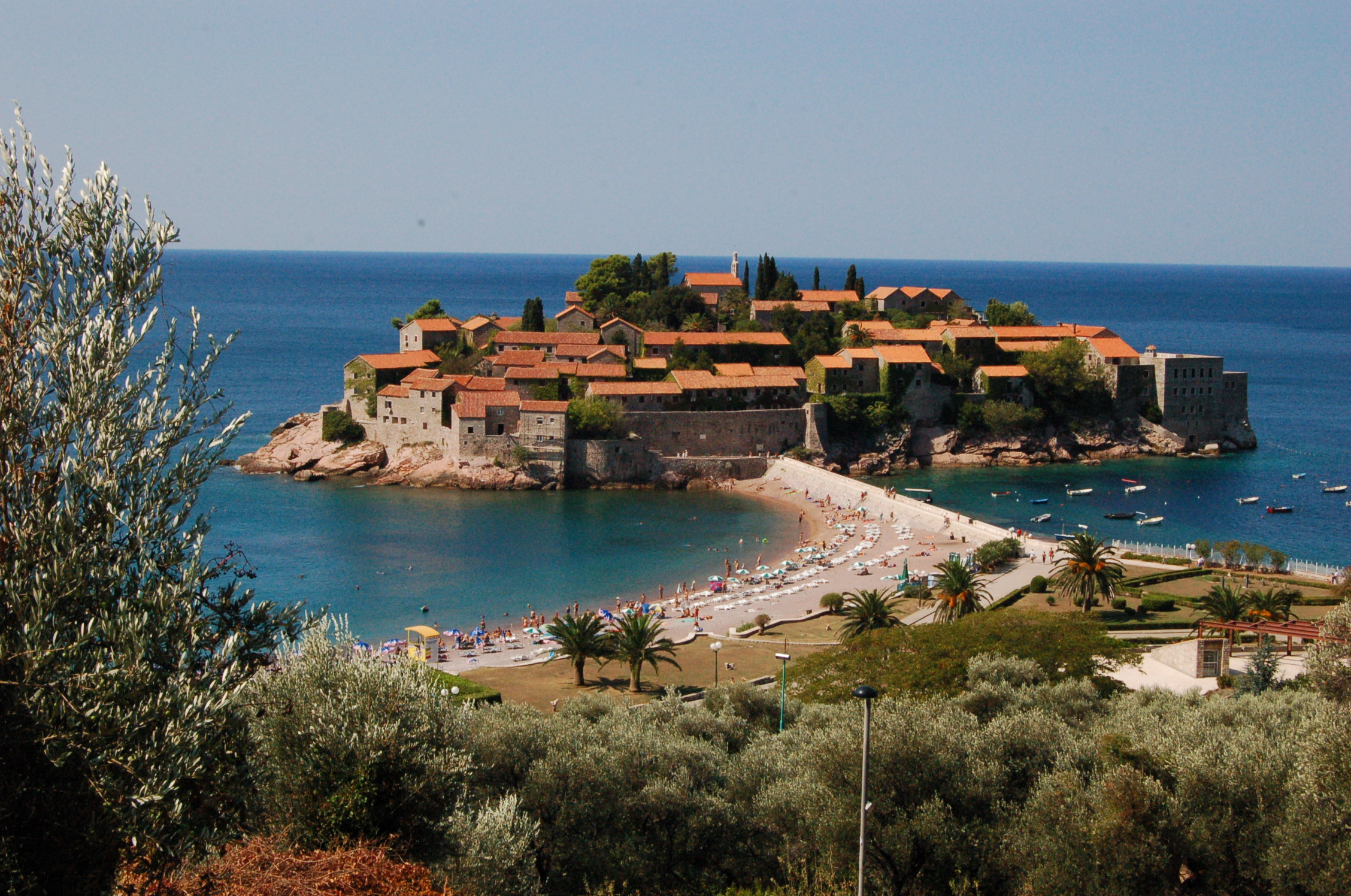
Sveti Stefan, near Budva

Tourism is the main driver of the economy of Budva. It is a significant tourist destination on the eastern Adriatic, and by far the most popular destination in Montenegro. During 2013, Budva recorded 668,931 tourist visits, and 4,468,913 overnight stays, thus accounting for 44.8% of tourist visits to Montenegro, and 47.5% of its overnight stays.

=== Beaches ===
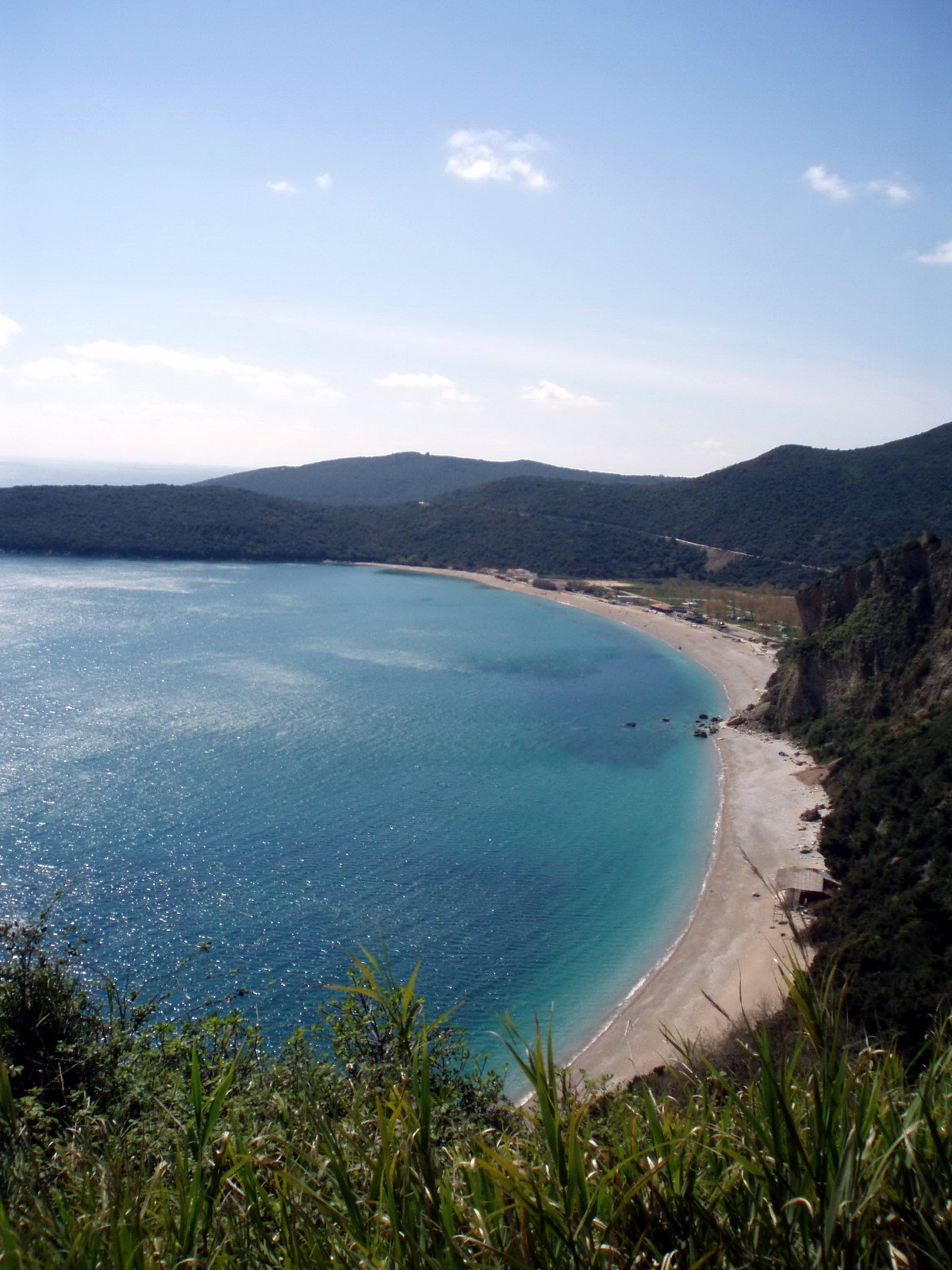
Jaz Beach, near Budva

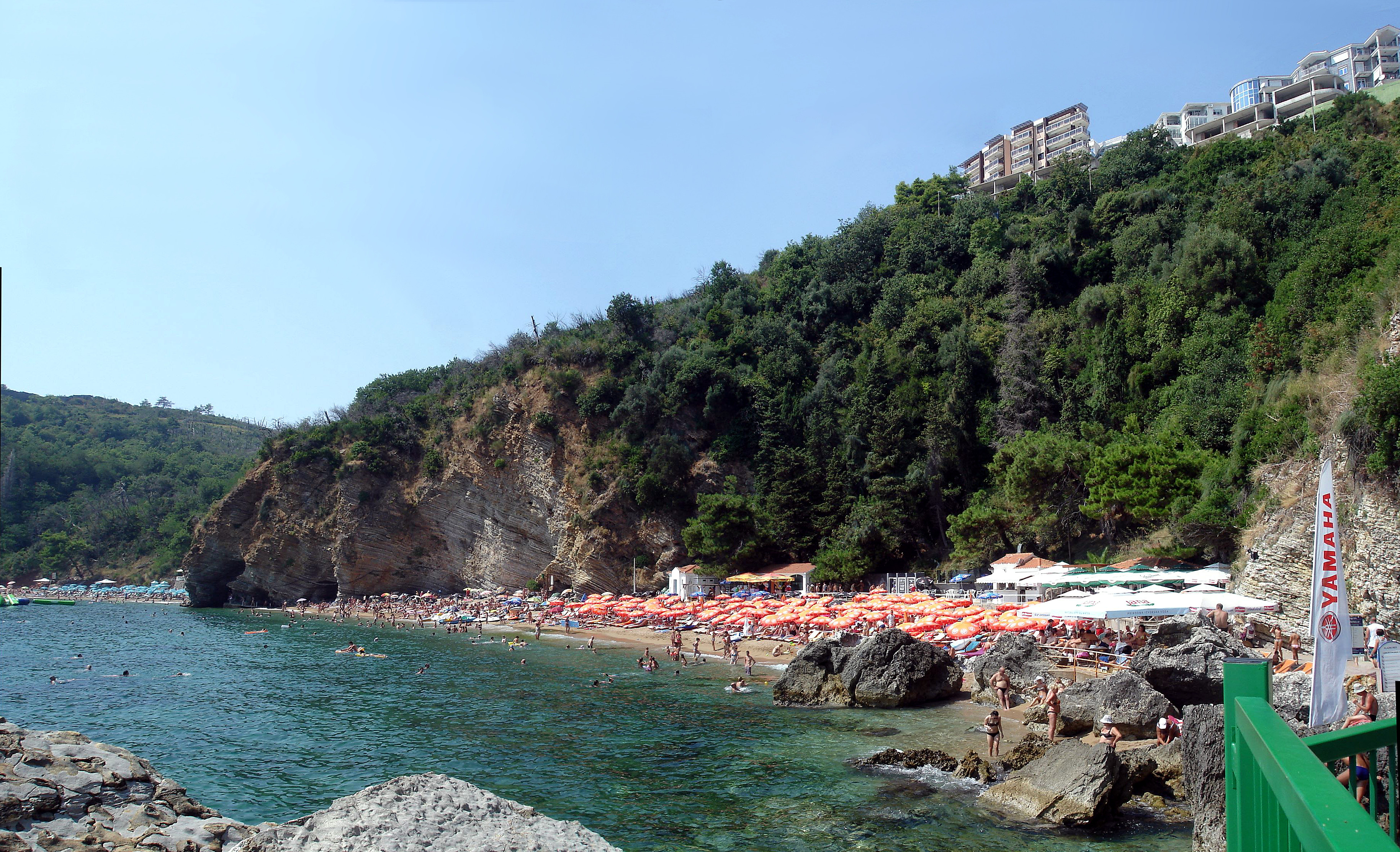
Mogren Beach

Mogren Beach is arguably the best known and most attractive of the Budva city beaches, nested beneath the cliffs of the Spas hill, between cape Mogren and the Avala hotel. The beach stretches over 350 metres (1,150 ft) and is divided into two distinct areas, Mogren 1 and Mogren 2. The beach is separated from Budva by the Spas hill and is accessible from the old town by a concrete path running 150 metres (490 ft) along the cliffs. The remains of Mogren Fortress are accessible from hiking trails from Mogren 2.

Other city beaches include the small Ričardova Glava Beach ("Richard's Head") and Pizana Beach, next to the Old Town, as well as the 1.6 km (1.0 mi) long Slovenska plaža (Slav beach), that makes up most of the city's coast.

However, majority of the beaches of Budva Riviera are outside the city itself. Jaz Beach is a long and spacious beach west of Budva, its hinterland serving as a popular concert and festival venue, as well as a campground. Bečići resort town, with its long sandy beach, is situated south-east of the city, separated from Budva by the Zavala peninsula.

Further to the south, numerous small beaches and towns, make up the more high end and exclusive part of Budva Riviera. This is especially true for the famous Sveti Stefan town, but also for other smaller Paštrovići settlements in the area, that once were unassuming fishing villages. The area of Sveti Stefan and Pržno, including Miločer resort with its park and secluded beaches, is considered the most exclusive area of the Montenegrin coast.

The town of Petrovac and the undeveloped Buljarica field occupy the very south of the Budva municipality.

Sveti Nikola Island is located opposite of Old Town, 1 kilometre (0.6 miles) across the Budva bay. Connected to the mainland via water bus, the island and its beaches are an excursion site for tourists visiting Budva.

=== Nightlife ===
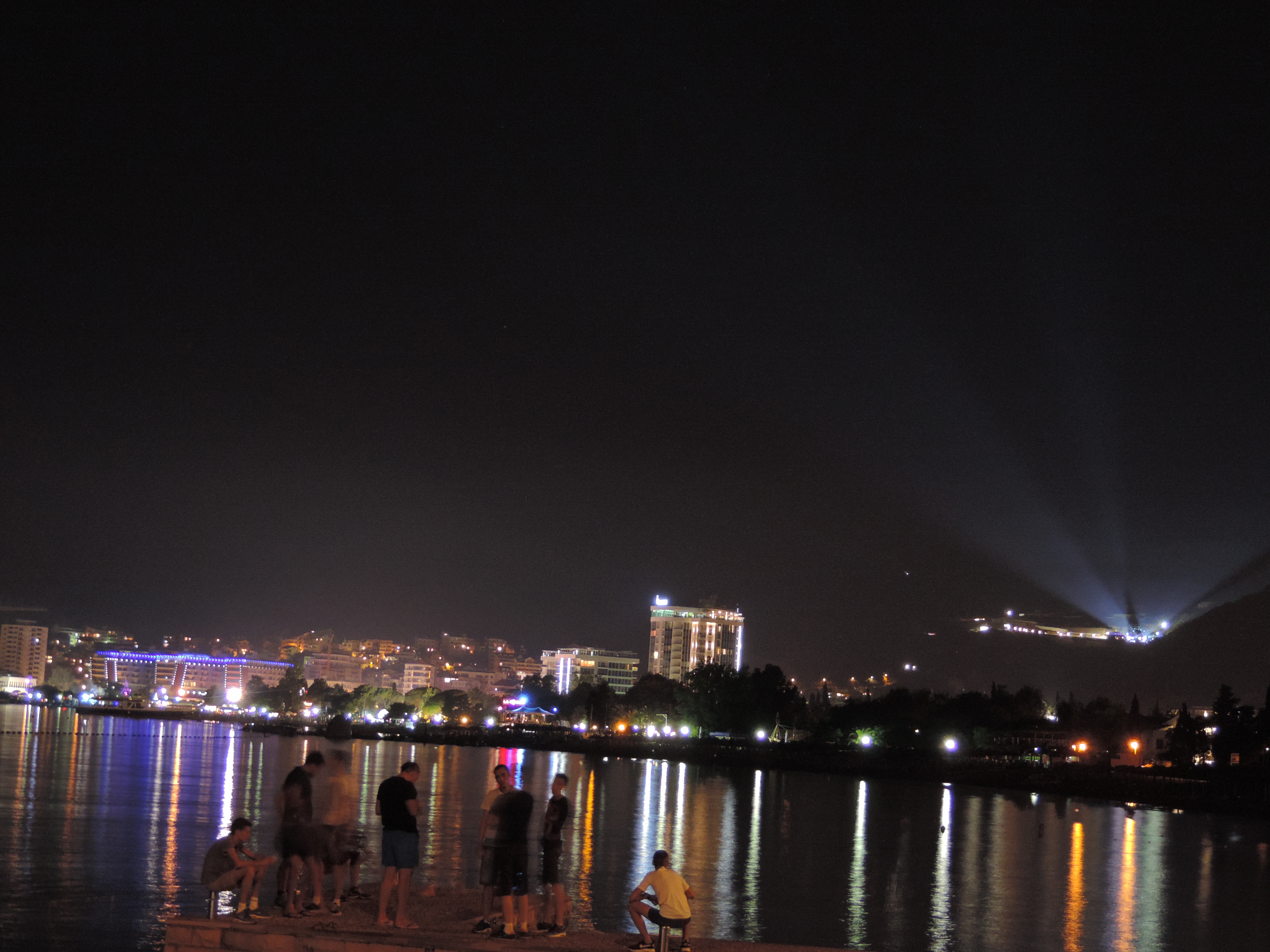
Budva by night

Budva is well known regionally as the capital of nightlife of the eastern Adriatic. The first discothèques in Budva started to emerge during the 1980s, as hotel-attached dance clubs. However, the clubbing scene mushroomed in the 1990s, with numerous open-air clubs opening along the Budva sea promenade. This trend continued into the 2000s, with Old Town and its promenade hosting a large number of bars, pubs and restaurants, and - since the closure of Trocadero - 1 big club, Top Hill, dominating the clubbing scene.

=== Other ===
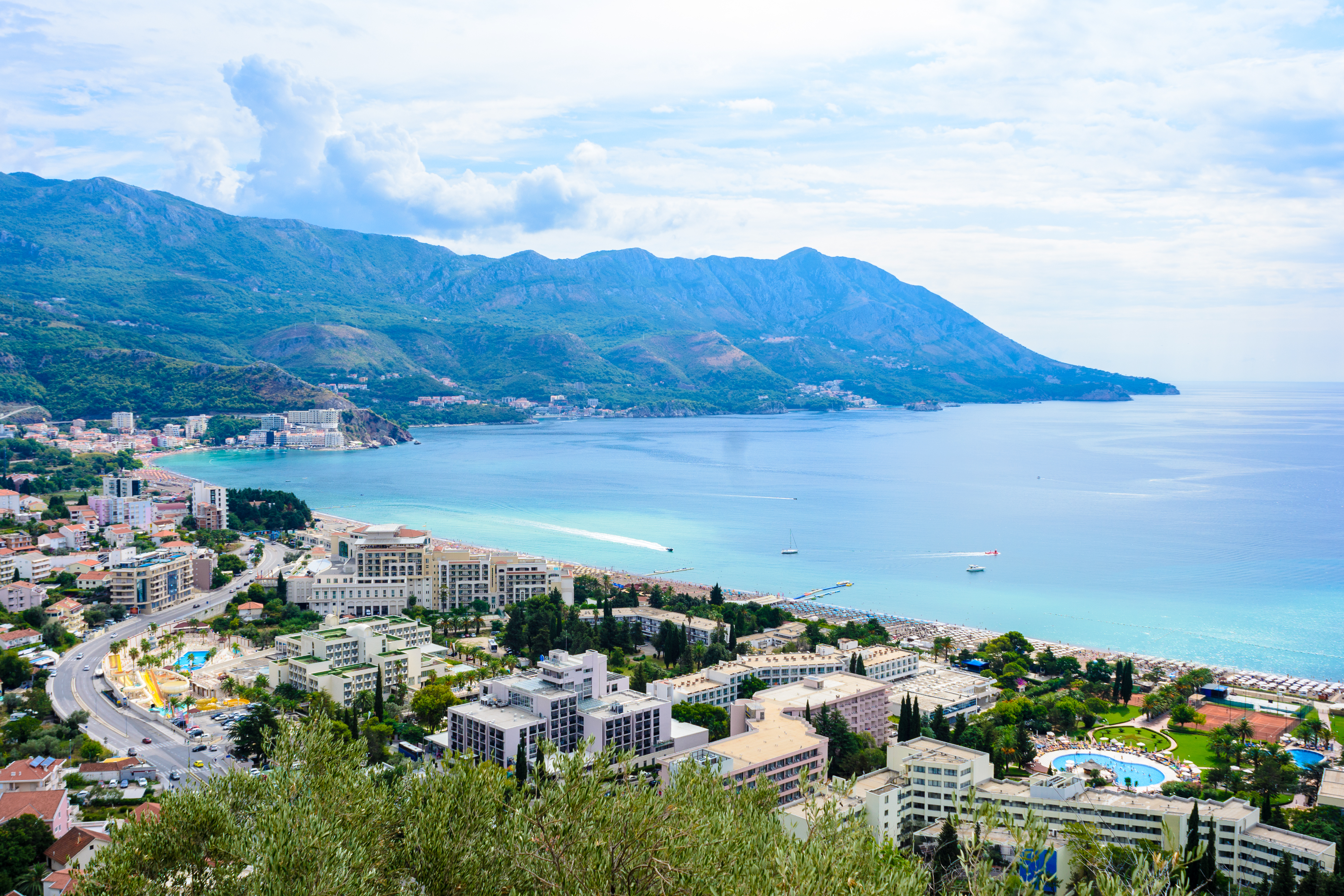
Panoramic view of Budva's coastline

Budva is home to the Adriatic Fair (Jadranski sajam), the only specialized exhibition venue in Montenegro. It hosts numerous trade fairs throughout the year, including the only auto show in Montenegro, held annually in autumn.

Gambling tourism is also popular in Budva, as many hotels have attached casinos. Maestral hotel and casino in Pržno are particularly popular among international gamblers, but other large hotels have also attracted players from European countries. The 2006 James Bond film Casino Royale is partly set in the eponymous casino in the fictional Montenegrin Hotel Splendide, thus giving a boost to Budva's profile as a gambling destination.

Budva's marina, nestled to the north of the Old Town city walls, contributes to the image of Budva as a nautical tourism destination. Luxury yachts dominate marina berths during the summer, overshadowing small fishing vessels owned by the locals. Budva marina was host to periodic boat shows, but in recent years it has been losing primacy to the larger and more luxurious Porto Montenegro. Budva was the host of the Class 1 World Powerboat Championship Grand prix in May 2008.

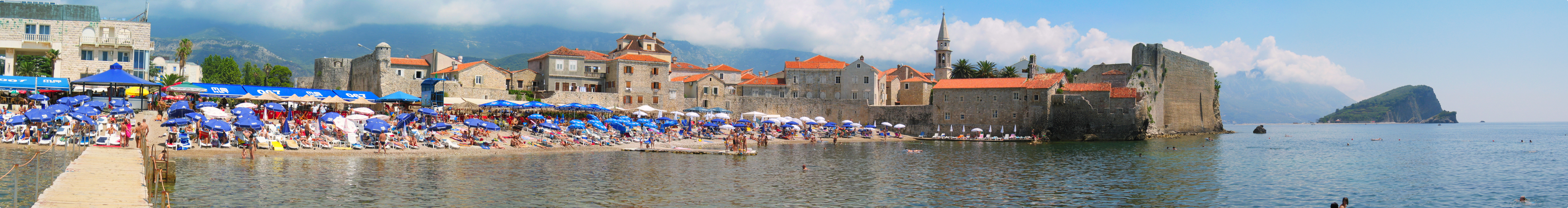
Panorama of Budva Old Town

== Climate ==
Budva has a Hot-summer Mediterranean climate (Köppen: Csa).

Climate data for Budva
| Month | Jan | Feb | Mar | Apr | May | Jun | Jul | Aug | Sep | Oct | Nov | Dec | Year |
|---|---|---|---|---|---|---|---|---|---|---|---|---|---|
| Mean daily maximum °C (°F) | 9.9 (49.8) | 10.8 (51.4) | 12.7 (54.9) | 15.6 (60.1) | 19.8 (67.6) | 24.2 (75.6) | 27.0 (80.6) | 27.4 (81.3) | 23.2 (73.8) | 19.5 (67.1) | 15.4 (59.7) | 11.5 (52.7) | 18.1 (64.6) |
| Daily mean °C (°F) | 8.3 (46.9) | 9.0 (48.2) | 10.8 (51.4) | 13.7 (56.7) | 17.9 (64.2) | 22.4 (72.3) | 25.2 (77.4) | 25.4 (77.7) | 21.4 (70.5) | 17.7 (63.9) | 13.8 (56.8) | 10.0 (50.0) | 16.3 (61.3) |
| Mean daily minimum °C (°F) | 6.8 (44.2) | 7.2 (45.0) | 8.8 (47.8) | 11.8 (53.2) | 16.1 (61.0) | 20.6 (69.1) | 23.2 (73.8) | 23.4 (74.1) | 19.5 (67.1) | 15.8 (60.4) | 12.2 (54.0) | 8.5 (47.3) | 14.5 (58.1) |
| Average precipitation mm (inches) | 211.6 (8.33) | 204.5 (8.05) | 190.0 (7.48) | 137.3 (5.41) | 107.8 (4.24) | 67.5 (2.66) | 41.8 (1.65) | 53.1 (2.09) | 192.0 (7.56) | 220.4 (8.68) | 312.4 (12.30) | 254.4 (10.02) | 1,992.8 (78.47) |
| Average relative humidity (%) | 71.4 | 71.0 | 70.8 | 73.2 | 75.7 | 74.9 | 71.9 | 71.6 | 71.8 | 74.3 | 74.0 | 72.4 | 72.7 |
| Mean monthly sunshine hours | 108.5 | 138.4 | 205.6 | 252.2 | 296.7 | 322.1 | 349.2 | 319.6 | 241.2 | 185.7 | 112.8 | 94.8 | 2,626.8 |
Source: Weather.Directory

== Culture ==
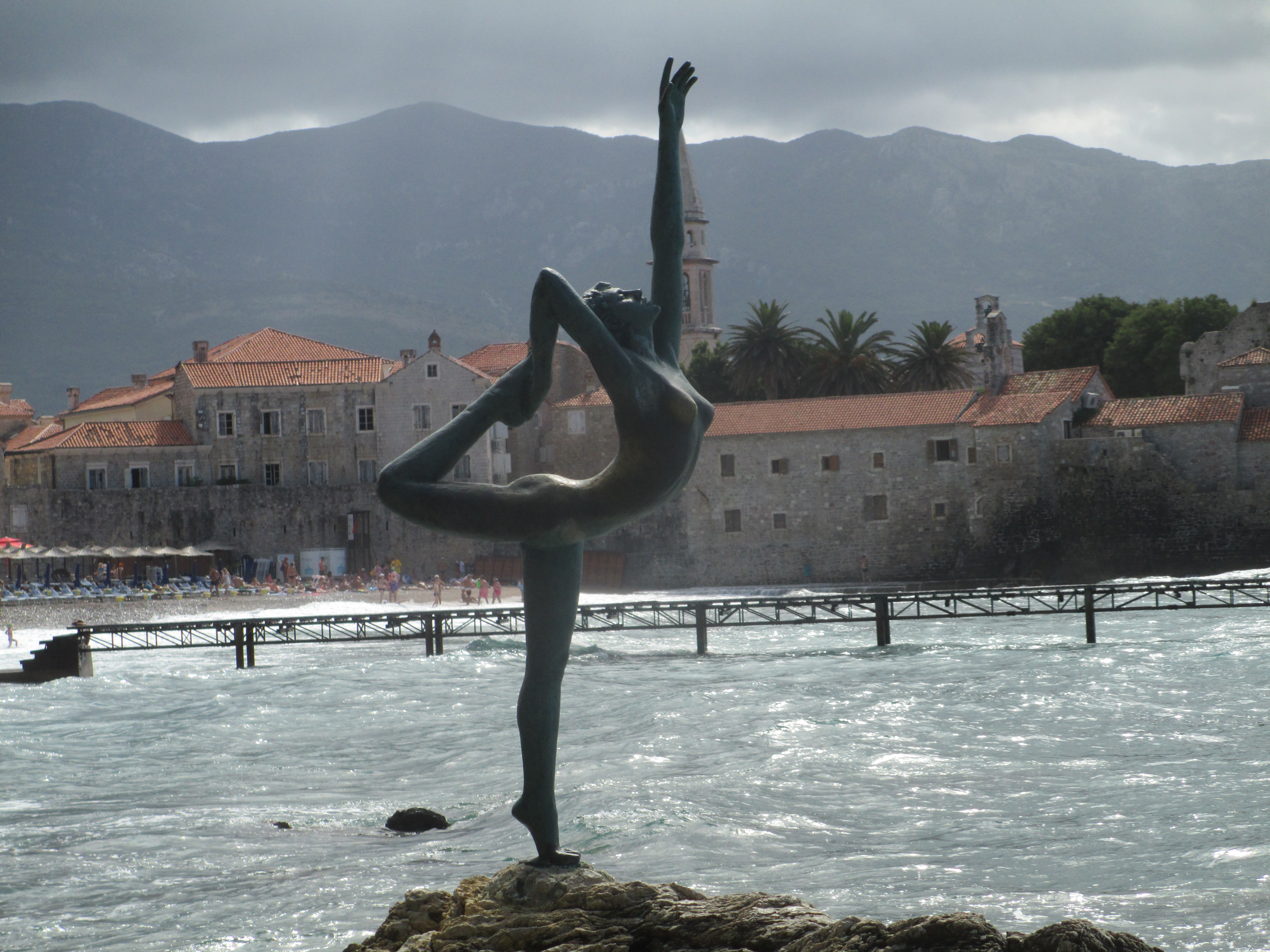
Budva dancer

Among the cultural events and establishments in the city, the annual cultural event Theatre City (Budva Grad Teatar) is of particular importance. Founded in 1987, and held in July and August every year, this festival transforms the entire Old Town into an open-air venue for a programme of theatre, musical, literary and visual art events and performances.

Another event in Budva was the Pjesma Mediterana ("Song of the Mediterranean"), annual pop musical festival, held in Budva from 1992 to 2010. Its format was similar to that of Sanremo Music Festival, featuring a competition of previously unreleased songs. The song contest attracted performers from the EX Yugoslavia region. However, the festival was cancelled in 2011 due to lack of funds, and has not been renewed since.

In 2014, the Sea Dance Festival was organized at Budva's Jaz Beach for the first time. A spin-off of the Exit festival, Sea Dance is set to be an annual event. Jaz Beach rose to prominence as a concert and festival venue with The Rolling Stones concert held on 9 July 2007. The show was part of their A Bigger Bang Tour and attracted a crowd of some 35,000 spectators, twice the population of Budva town itself. Madonna staged a show attended by 47,000 spectators at the same venue on 25 September 2008, while Lenny Kravitz and Armand Van Helden performed at Jaz beach during the "Live Fest" in August 2008, along with Goran Bregović, Dino Merlin and Zdravko Čolić.

Budva Carnival is a three-day long festive event in Budva, happening annually during late April or early May. It has been organized every year since 2003, and although a recent carnival, it has attracted significant regional attention. Budva, together with nearby Kotor, was host to the Federation of European Carnival Cities (FECC) World Carnival City Congress in May 2009. The 2026 International Budva Carnival, held from April 30 to May 4, marks the 23rd edition of the event. It serves as the official opening of the tourism season, featuring masked parades, concerts, and international performances throughout the Old Town.

Budva city museum is one of the prominent cultural institutions in the city, featuring permanent archaeological and ethnographic exhibits. Stefan Mitrov Ljubiša memorial home is another significant institution, honoring the legacy of the famous native of Budva.

Budva occupies a significant place in the history of the cinema of Montenegro, as it was home to the Zeta Film, the Montenegrin primary motion picture company from the Yugoslav era. The now-defunct company has produced numerous Yugoslav movies, including pictures by the Montenegrin director Živko Nikolić. Zeta Film was privatized in 2004, and its building was converted to a nightclub, leaving Budva without a single movie theater for a decade. On 30 May 2015, a brand new four screen multiplex cinema opened in TQ Plaza shopping mall.

The city has occasionally provided the backdrop for international movie productions. The 1964 movie The Long Ships was shot in and around Budva, and the prop from the movie, a large 4m tall cracked bell, has been permanently displayed in front of the Old Town walls, becoming one of the local landmarks. Recently, Budva has been the setting and the filming location of the locally produced, and regionally popular TV series Budva na pjenu od mora (Budva, on the sea foam).

=== Education ===
Budva has two elementary schools and one high school. In 2009, city administration founded Knowledge Academy (Akademija Znanja), an institution envisioned to act as a university center and introduce higher education to Budva. The Knowledge Academy building, situated in the Rozino neighbourhood of Budva, is currently home to Budva city library and private Business and Tourism faculty, and serves as the center of higher education of the municipality.

=== Sports ===
FK Mogren was the most popular football club in Budva, and the sports club with longest tradition in the city. Founded in 1920, it competed in the Montenegrin First League, winning the championship in 2008–09 and 2010–11. The club also won the Montenegrin Cup of 2008. The club went bankrupt and was expelled in 2017. Stadion Lugovi, the home ground of FK Mogren, will probably be relocated in the near future, as it is situated on a very valuable land lot, right next to the Slovenska beach.

OFK Petrovac, from the eponymous town, is another significant football team from the Budva municipality.

Another popular sport in Budva is volleyball, with Budvanska Rivijera volleyball team being successful in domestic and international competition. Mediteranski sportski centar ("Mediterranean sports center") is the main indoor sport venue of Budva, and is the home of Budvanska Riviera volleyball team and RK Budvanska Rivijera handball team. The town's basketball team is KK Mogren and RK Budvanska Rivijera is the handball club.

Water polo is a common sport in Budva, as on the rest of the Montenegrin coast. VK Budva is the city's water polo team, competing in the regional Adriatic Water Polo League.

Paragliding is a summer activity in Budva. Steep 700m high hills provide perfect setting and stunning vistas for paragliders, with the hamlet of Brajići being the usual launching point.

== Transport ==
Budva is connected to inland Montenegro by two-laned highways. There are two ways to reach Budva from Podgorica – either through Cetinje, or through the Sozina tunnel (opened 2005). Either way, Podgorica, the capital and main road junction in Montenegro, is around 60 km (37 mi) away.

Budva is connected to the rest of the coastal towns of Montenegro by the Adriatic Highway, which extends from Ulcinj in the far south to Herceg Novi in the north, and on to Croatia.

Tivat Airport is 20 km (12 mi) away. There are regular flights to Belgrade and Moscow throughout the year, and dozens of seasonal and charter flights land daily at the airport during the summer season. Podgorica Airport is 65 km (40 mi) away, and it has regular flights to a number of European destinations throughout the year.

Urban transport consists of Mediteran Express buses, which operate between Budva's city center and Sveti Stefan. This line services a large portion of the Budva urban core, as well as some small towns between Budva and Sveti Stefan.

The closest train station is Sutomore. This stop on the Belgrade–Bar railway is some 30 km (19 mi) away from Budva's city center.

== Notable people ==
- Cristoforo Ivanovich - 17th century historian of opera who later became a composer
- Stefano Zannowich - 18th century adventurer
- Visarion Ljubiša - Serbian Orthodox Metropolitan Bishop of Montenegro from 1882 to 1884

== Twin towns – sister cities ==
Budva is twinned with:

- Banská Bystrica, Slovakia
- Belgrade, Serbia
- Bijeljina, Bosnia and Herzegovina
- Celje, Slovenia
- Čukarica (Belgrade), Serbia
- Eastern AO (Moscow), Russia
- Kamnik, Slovenia
- Kyiv, Ukraine
- Laktaši, Bosnia and Herzegovina
- Makarska, Croatia
- Novi Sad, Serbia
- Ohrid, North Macedonia
- Pakrac, Croatia
- Petacciato, Italy
- Petropavlovsk-Kamchatsky, Moscow, Russia
- Prague 4 (Prague), Czech Republic
- Rimini, Italy
- Stari Grad (Sarajevo), Bosnia and Herzegovina
- Valašské Meziříčí, Czech Republic
- Velika Plana, Serbia
- Vrnjačka Banja, Serbia
- West Palm Beach, United States
- Yalova, Turkey
- Zigong, China

== See also ==
- List of settlements in Illyria
- Roman Catholic Diocese of Budua

== Sources and external links ==
=== Official sites ===
- Budva Municipality Official website
- Local Tourism Organisation of Budva

=== Travel websites ===
- Budva.com
- JourneyWithAnn.com
- Budva webcam
- Weather in Budva
