= Sveti Nikola Island (Budva) =

Island in Montenegro

Coordinates: 42°16′N 18°51′E

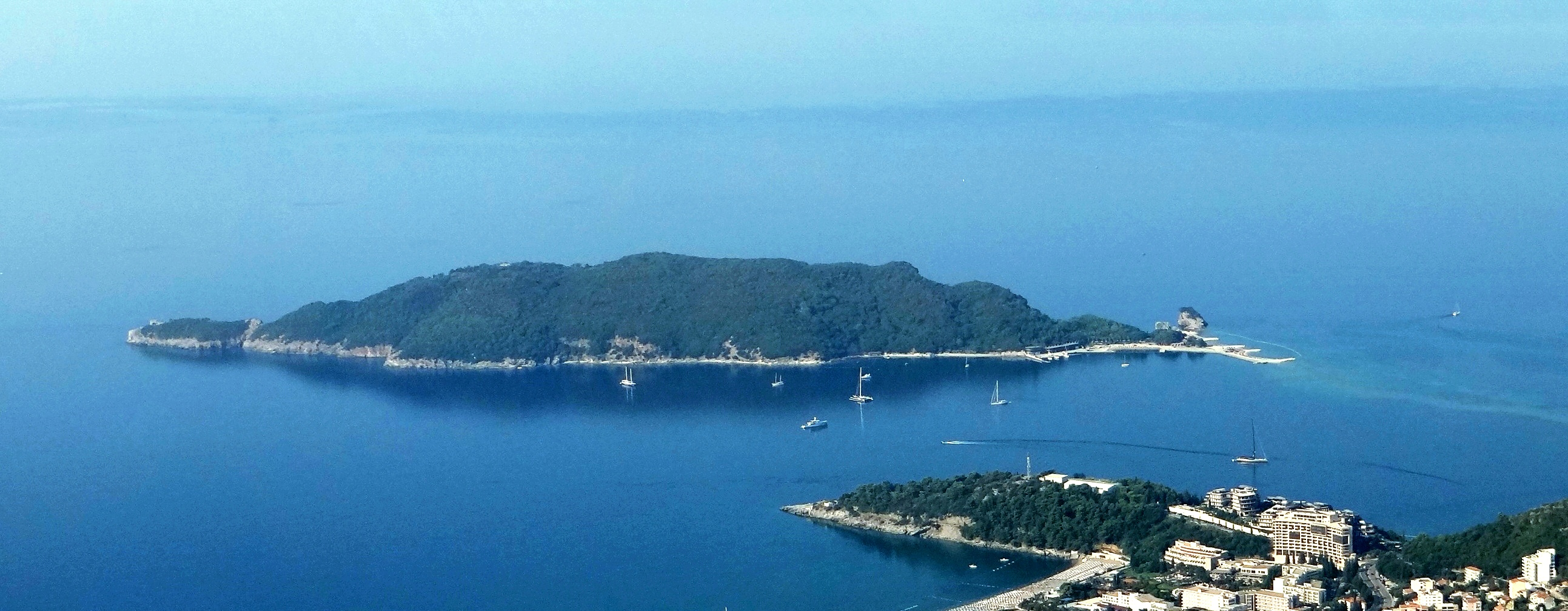
Školj, or Sveti Nikola Island

Sveti Nikola Island (Serbian: Острво Свети Никола, romanized: Ostrvo Sveti Nikola, lit. 'Island of Saint Nicholas') is an island in the Adriatic Sea, in the Montenegrin municipality of Budva.

== Description ==
Sveti Nikola island is located opposite to the town of Budva, 1 kilometre (0.6 miles) from Budva's old town. The island is 2 kilometres (1 mile) long, and it has an area of 36 hectares (89 acres). The highest point on the island is a cliff that rises 121 metres (397 feet) above the sea.

The island is a popular excursion site in the Budva area. It has three bigger sandy beaches with a total length of 840 metres (2,760 feet), and numerous small beaches around the island, accessible only by boat.

Deer inhabit the uncultivated part of the island. The island is called Školj by locals, which comes from Italian scoglio or from Venetian scogio meaning islet or reef.

== See also ==
Budva Riviera
