= Montenegro real estate taxes =

Taxation of Real Estate in Montenegro

On May 21, 2006, the majority of 55.53% voted in a referendum for Montenegro as an independent state. The Government of the country declared its intentions to join EU and NATO. Shortly after that it became a 192nd member of United Nations in July 2006. In the press release of 29 June the Government “emphasized the readiness and determination to build its development policy on the United Nations’ principles and make an active contribution towards achieving the goals and universal values advocated by the UN”. But the process of integration into European community and economic development began in 1991 when Montenegro proclaimed to be ecological state and thus created favorable tourist conditions and attractive property investment opportunities. The country's Ministry of Tourism and Environment Protection in 2001 unveiled the Tourism Master Plan, a blueprint for all tourism planning and targets up to 2020. In April 2003 Montenegro joined the Council of Europe. According to World Travel & Tourism Council report the Government of Montenegro is successfully implementing the plan and “have adopted most of the recommendations put forward by WTTC in its 2004 Country Report - exceeding both the forecasts and goals that were set”.

Situated at the shore of Adriatic Sea Montenegro has 117 unique sandy and pebble beaches. UNESCO-protected bay of Kotor and the Tara canyon are of particular value, which enables Montenegro to achieve such success in tourist and property market over the last decade. There are four national parks, which are the most attractive and ecologically best preserved nature reserves (Durmitor, Biogradska gora, Lake Skadar, and Lovcen). The intentions are to establish two more.

== Montenegro real estate regulations development ==
Montenegro has successfully implemented and established laws and strategies, which helped to achieve such significant improvement in the fields of economics and tourism. Adopting best practices of European community Montenegro continues to implement Economic Reform Agenda, adjusts tax legislation to international standards and EU directives.

Numerous legislation activities such as development of new institutions ensure better efficiency of the system and its better adjustment to the needs of citizens, business and society in general. For example, Real Estate Administration (former Republic Institute for Geodetic and Property-legal Affairs), which is supposed to provide certainty and legal safety of real estate, i.e. formalization of property of land and buildings as elementary condition for efficient development. As regards the legislation, new Law on State Survey and Cadastre and Registration of Real Estate Rights are adopted to solve the issues occurred because of imperfections and restrictions noted in the past application of the existing regulations and aimed to establish the accordance with many changes and requirements of economy, to enable realization of future programs and projects in the field of modernization of cadastral system in the state of Montenegro.

Montenegro still continues to develop its legislation system, proposing new Drafts of existing Law and elaborates new normative regulation of relations, which have not been regulated so far in compliance with European norms and standards- “Draft Law mostly contains provisions which have been taken from the former Federal Law, offering a unique, consistent and integral text concerning property-rights relations, and regulating previously unregulated relations.”

== Property purchase procedure, taxes and related fees ==
Foreign investors have no restrictions on buying and selling real estate in Montenegro and can do it the same way the locals do. It applies to all commercial and residential properties including plots of land. There are a few exceptions - Plots at the first line near the Adriatic Sea and lands of national and historic importance belong to the state and can be rented only. This helps to protect the unique nature and preserve environment of the seashore of Adriatic. When an investor chooses a property, as a rule, deposit of 10% of property price is paid to secure the transaction and the investor's solicitor prepares Draft property purchase contract. After the terms and conditions have been negotiated and the property and its ownership is checked in the cadastre, the price of property is paid in full by cash or bank transaction (if by bank then 21% VAT applies to the sum transferred by bank). When the final purchase contract is signed, the new ownership is registered in the Court.

In terms of additional costs associated with the investment property buying process the investor is responsible for legal fees paid to his/her lawyer who is supposed to prepare Draft and after Final property Purchase contract and other related Court costs to transfer ownership and register the new owner of property. In addition to all registration fees (which is about 500 euros) the buyer pays the transfer tax of about 3% for re-sale and new build properties. The agent's commission is between 3 and 8%, usually paid by the seller. The buyer does not usually pay a fee.

== See also ==
- Culture of Montenegro
- Economy of Montenegro
- Foreign relations of Montenegro
- History of Yugoslavia
- History of the Balkans
- Cuisine of Montenegro
- Law enforcement in Montenegro
- List of rulers of Montenegro
- Montenegrin independence referendum
- Politics of Montenegro
- Tourism in Montenegro
