= Budva Riviera =

Montenegro on the Mediterranean

Coordinates: 42°17′5.2″N 18°50′46.5″E

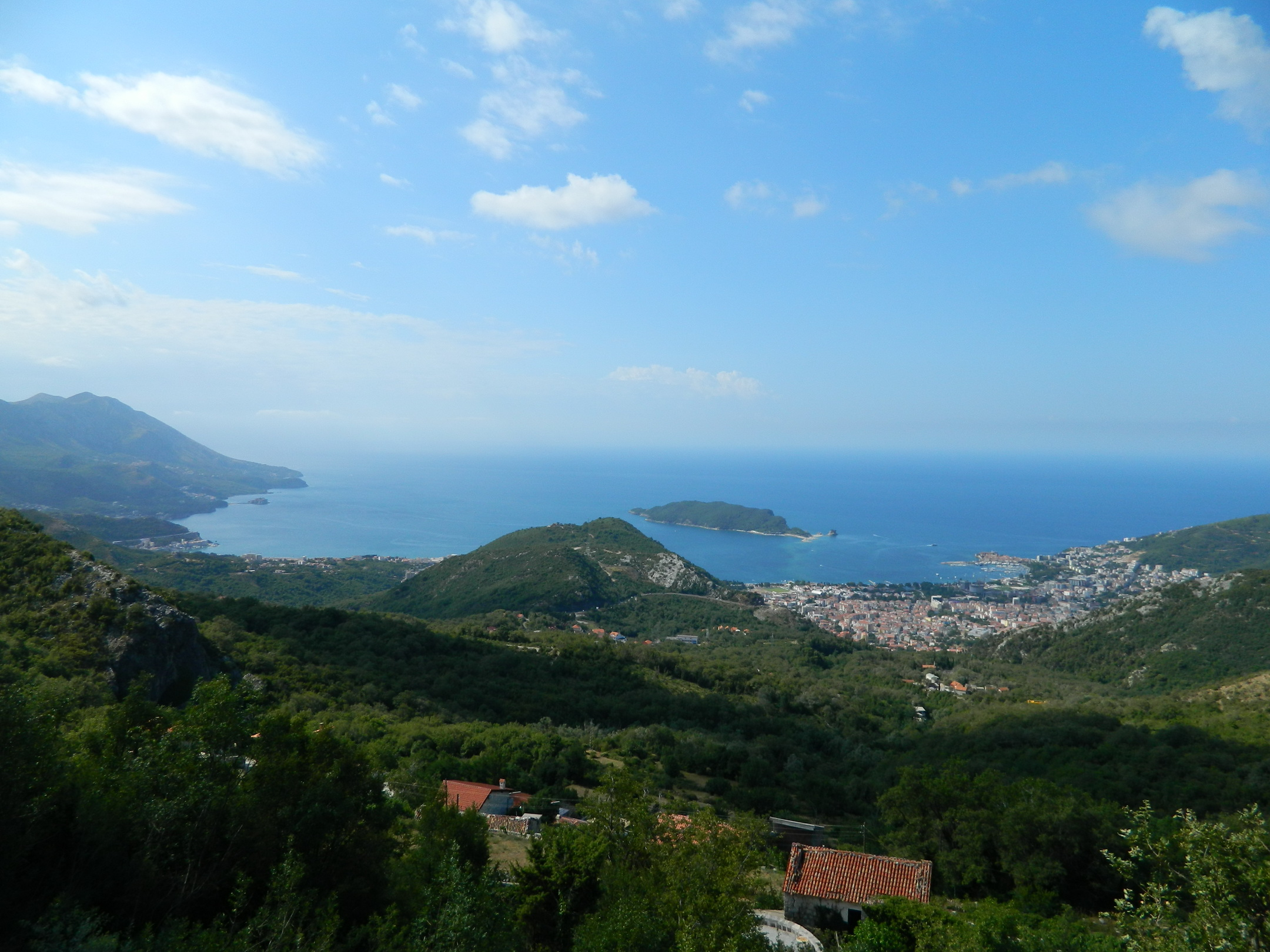
View of the Budva Riviera from the mountains.

The Budvanian Riviera (Serbian: Будванска ривијера, romanized: Budvanska rivijera) is a 35 km (22 mi) long strip of the Adriatic coast surrounding the town of Budva in western Montenegro. It is part of the Montenegrin Littoral geographical region. It is located roughly along the middle of the Montenegrin coast, and is a center for Montenegrin beach tourism. There are 21 km (13 mi) of beaches which lie along the Budva Riviera.

== Settlements ==
The best known and most popular settlements along the Budva Riviera are:

- Budva
- Bečići
- Miločer
- Rafailovići
- Sveti Stefan
- Petrovac

== See also ==
- Tourism in Montenegro
- Riviera, featuring links to articles on the many coastal strips around the world which are known as Riviera
