= Tourism in Montenegro =

Montenegro is one of the fastest-growing tourist destinations. In 2007, over a million tourists visited Montenegro, making some 7.3 million overnight stays (23% increase, compared to 2006). This accounted for some €480 million in tourism revenue in 2007 (39% increase, compared to previous year). In 2015, tourism realised over 1.7 million arrivals, with a further increase in 2016. In the same year, the coastal town of Kotor was named the best city to visit by Lonely Planet, whereas the country itself is continuously included in touristic top lists. With a total of 1.8 million visitors in 2016, the nation became the 36th (out of 47 countries) most popular country to travel to in Europe. Montenegro was further visited by over 2 million tourists in 2017. The Government aims to attract greenfield investments, which should make best use of undeveloped parts of the coast, such as Jaz Beach, Velika Plaža, Ada Bojana and Buljarica.

Montenegro can be presented as a destination offering a variety of attractions and all-year tourism is possible by publicizing its varied features. Therefore, the Tourism Masterplan of Montenegro is also paving the way for a national development program for nature based tourism, especially hiking and biking, with new infrastructure and services. The realisation of a 3-year-program was started in 2007.

== Main points of interest ==
=== Coastal region ===
North Coast region

This notable coastal region is of primary interest to tourists in Montenegro. The Montenegrin Adriatic coast is 295 km long, with 72 km of beaches, and with many well-preserved ancient old towns. The main attractions along the north coast are:

- The old Town of Herceg Novi
- The Savina Monastery overlooking the entrance to the Bay of Kotor
- The old town of Kotor, listed with UNESCO World Heritage Sites
- Boka Kotorska (Bay of Kotor), with the ancient small town of Perast
- Porto Montenegro – Luxury Yacht Marina in Tivat (only city on Montenegrin coast to have airport)
- The old town of Budva, a well preserved old town
- Sveti Stefan, a small island hamlet turned into a luxury hotel
- Town Petrovac near Budva

As a part of the Institute of Marine Biology, in 2020 was established Adriatic Biodiversity Conservation Center ″Aquarium Boka″. It is the first and only public aquarium in Montenegro. It is also a unique institution in Montenegro that combines research and education to promote and practice the efficient conservation of marine wildlife and a new attraction in the tourist offer of the city of Kotor.

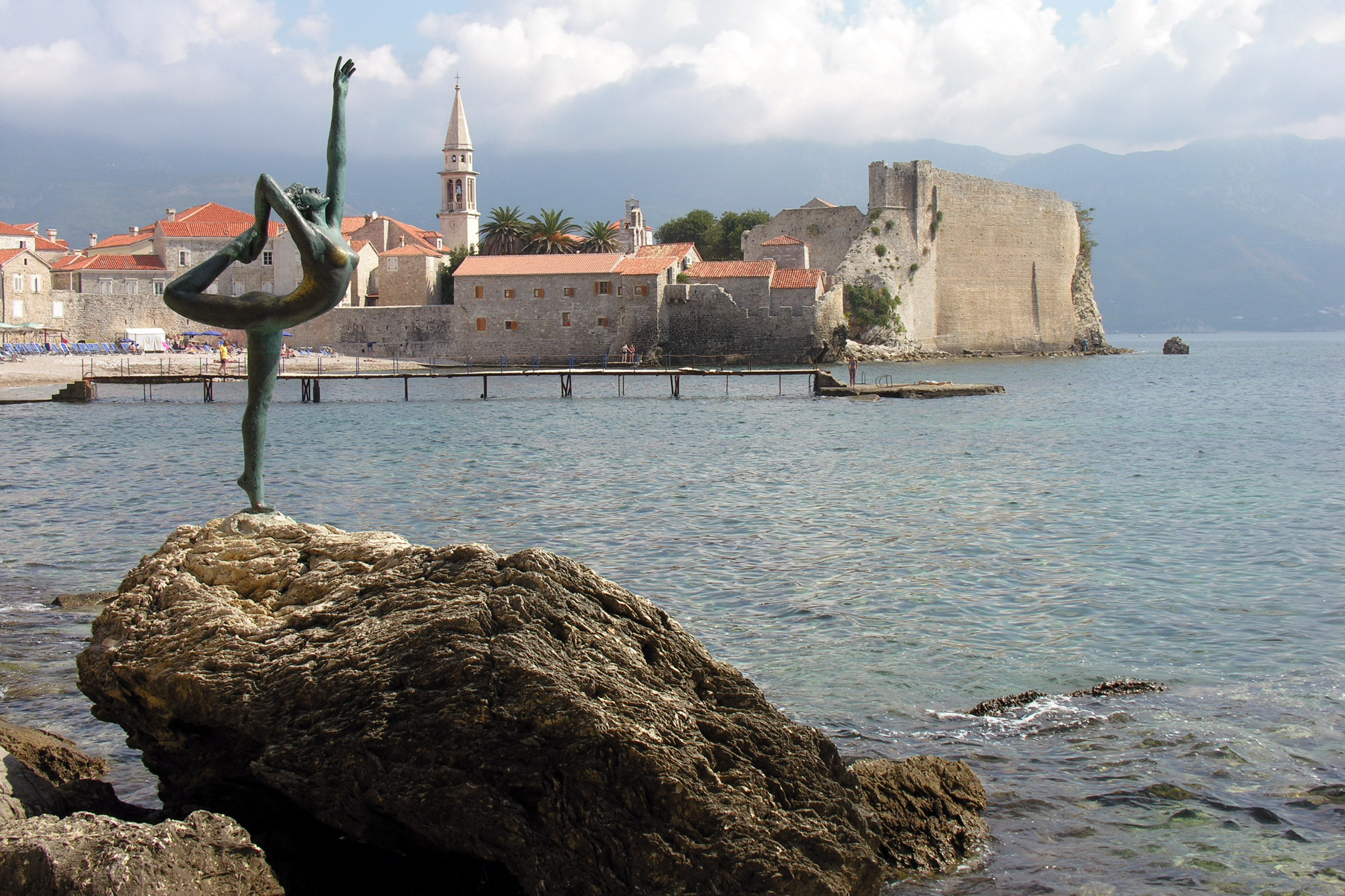
Budva

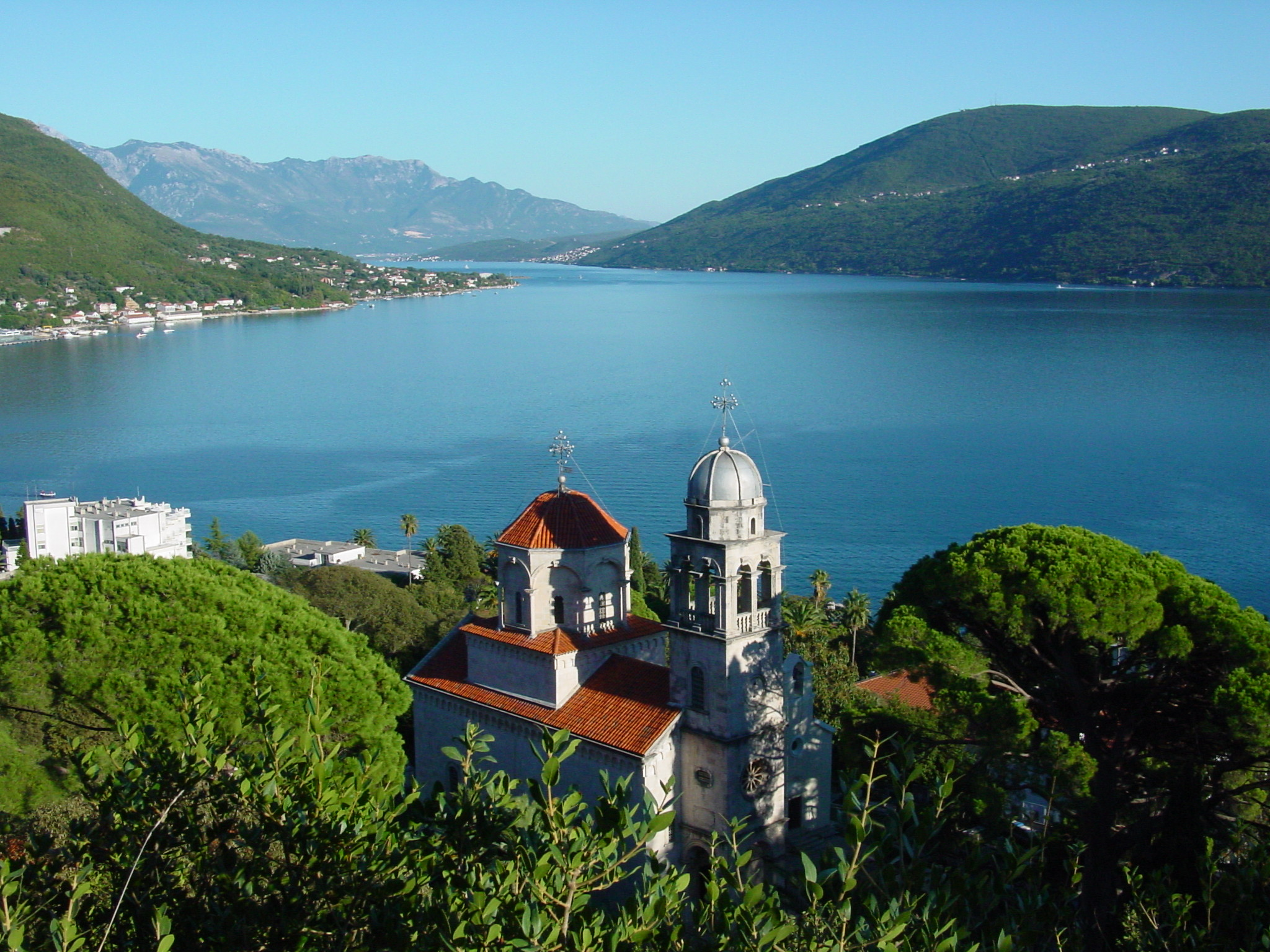
Savina Monastery

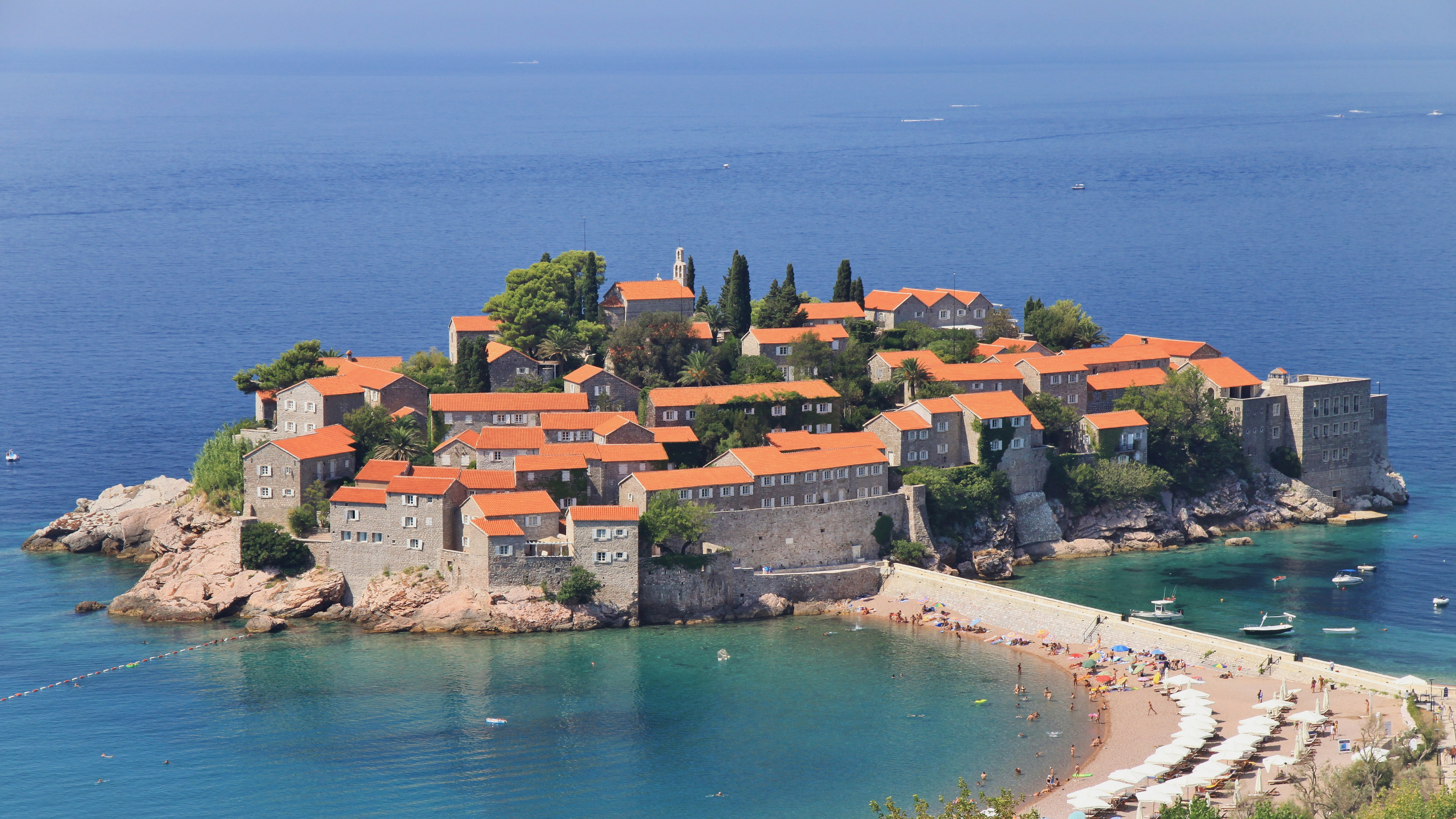
Sveti Stefan

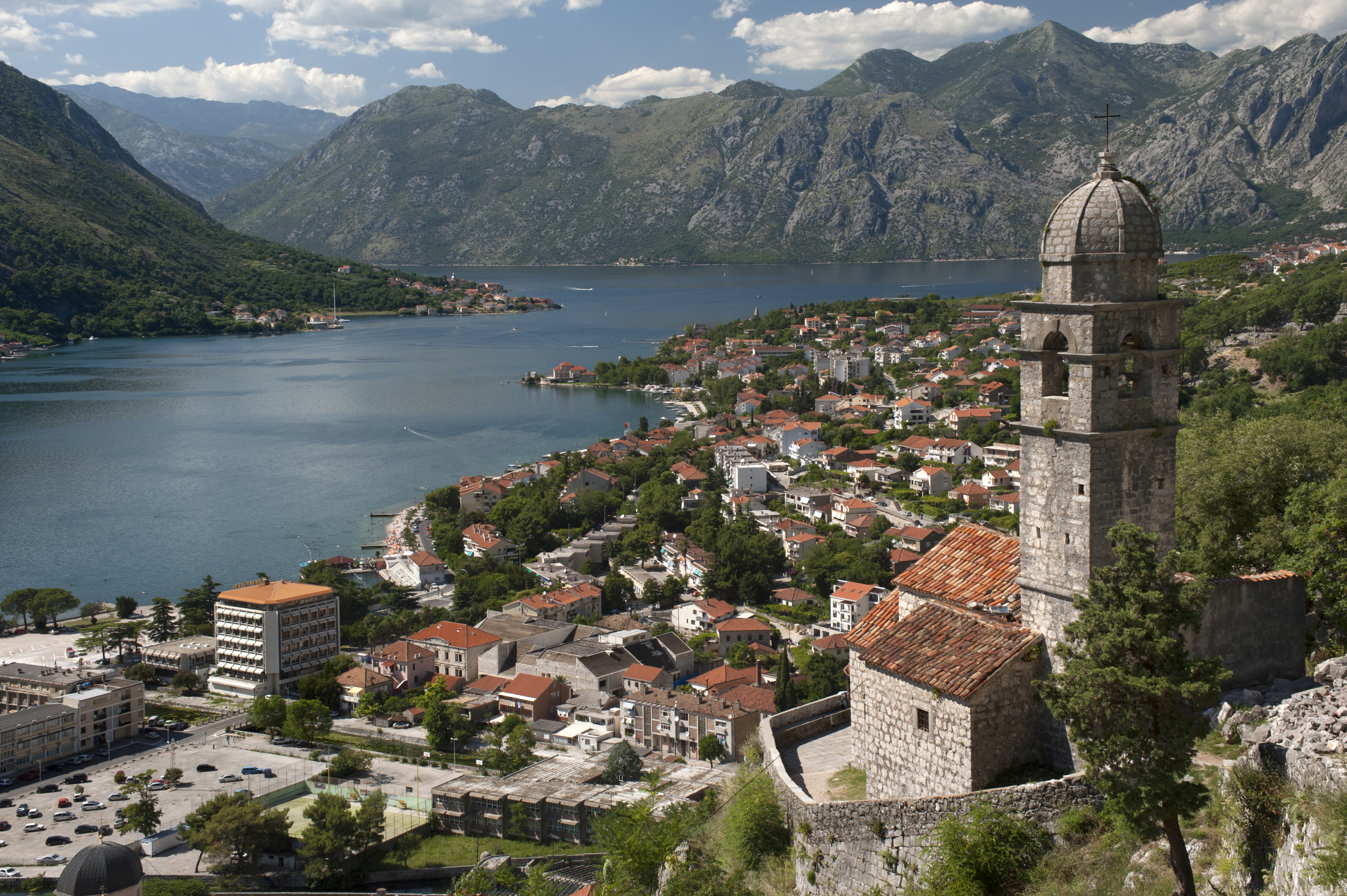
Kotor

South Coast region

The South Coast region of Montenegro is considered one of the great new "discoveries" among world tourists. In January 2010, The New York Times ranked the Ulcinj South Coast region of Montenegro, including Velika Plaza, Ada Bojana, and the Hotel Mediteran of Ulcinj, as among the "Top 31 Places to Go in 2010" as part of a worldwide ranking of tourism destinations

The South Coast region, centered in Ulcinj, is popular in part due to the "Blue Flag beach" sandy beaches, eco-adventure activities, ancient fortress-cities, and vibrant nightlife. These destinations include:

- The old town of Ulcinj with its prominent battlements and Cyclopean walls, bustling nightlife and sea-side strand, and home of the Montenegro's longest pristine beach, Velika Plaza.
- The old town of Bar, Montenegro with its "living museum" at Stari Bar.
- Ada Bojana at the very south of Montenegro's coastline, with its famed daily fresh catch featured at the area's seafood riverside restaurants.16 km from Ulcinj.
- The vast water body and wildlife reserve Skadar Lake at Ulcinj's Salt Flats, one of the largest nesting places on the European continent for migratory birds.
- The pebble beach and massive olive groves at Valdanos.
- The beach, sea caves and pine resin in the air at Ulcinj's Ladies Beach, that for generations locals have known promise cures for infertility and other ailments.
- The only deep water harbor and commercial port in Montenegro, at Bar.
- Beaches, fortresses and villages on Skadar Lake
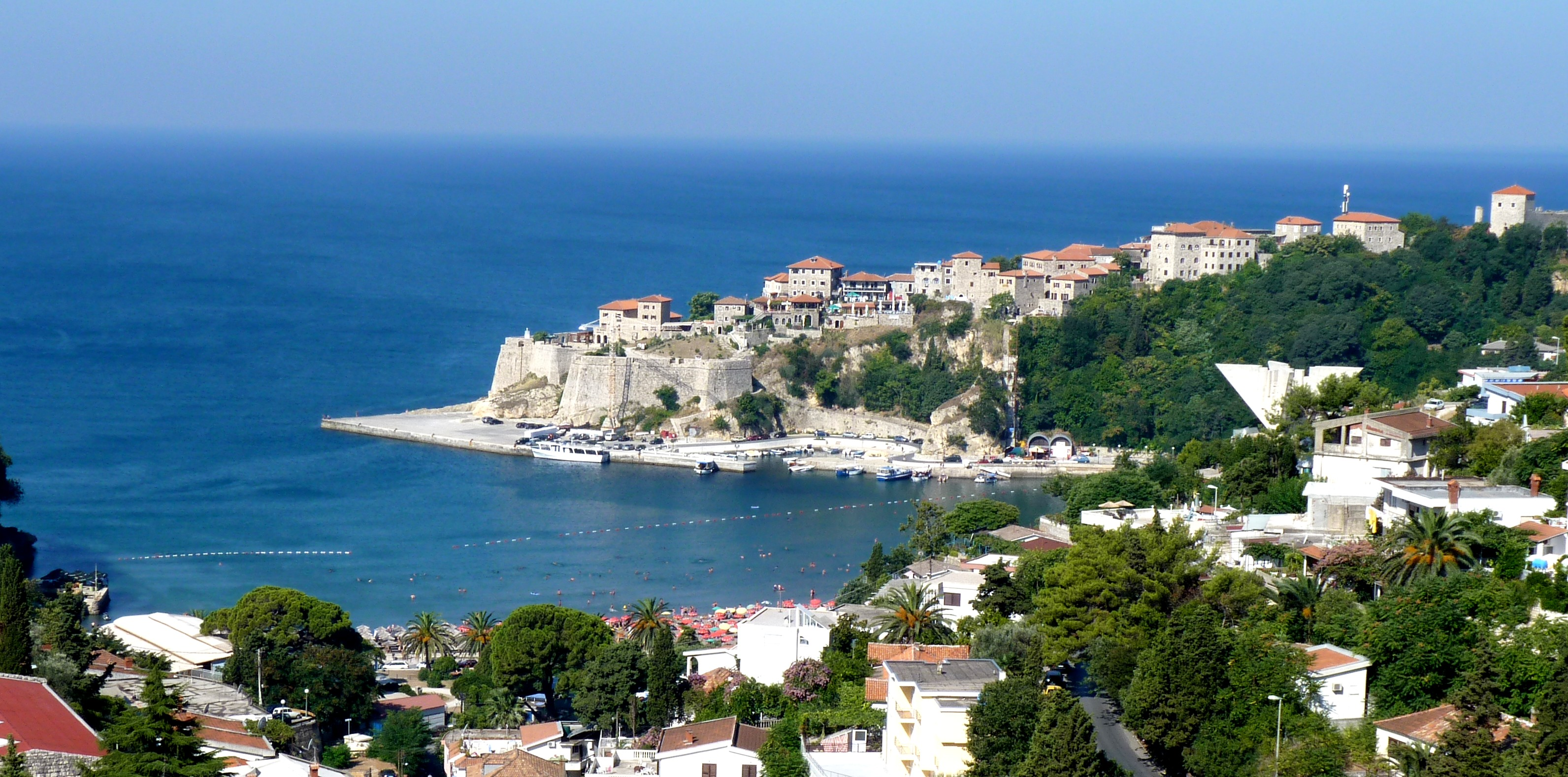
Ulcinj Old Town

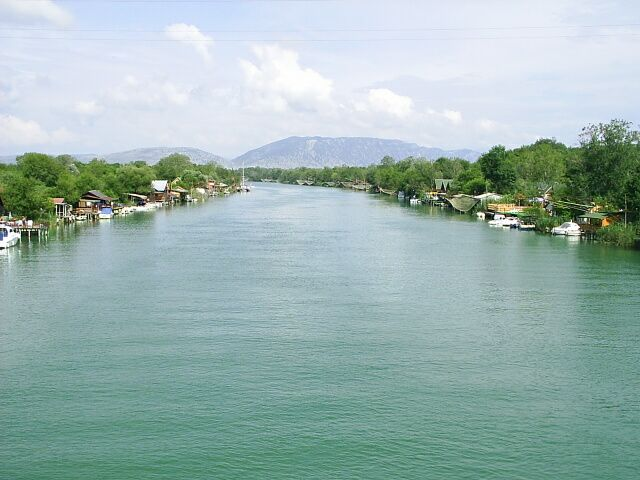
Ada Bojana

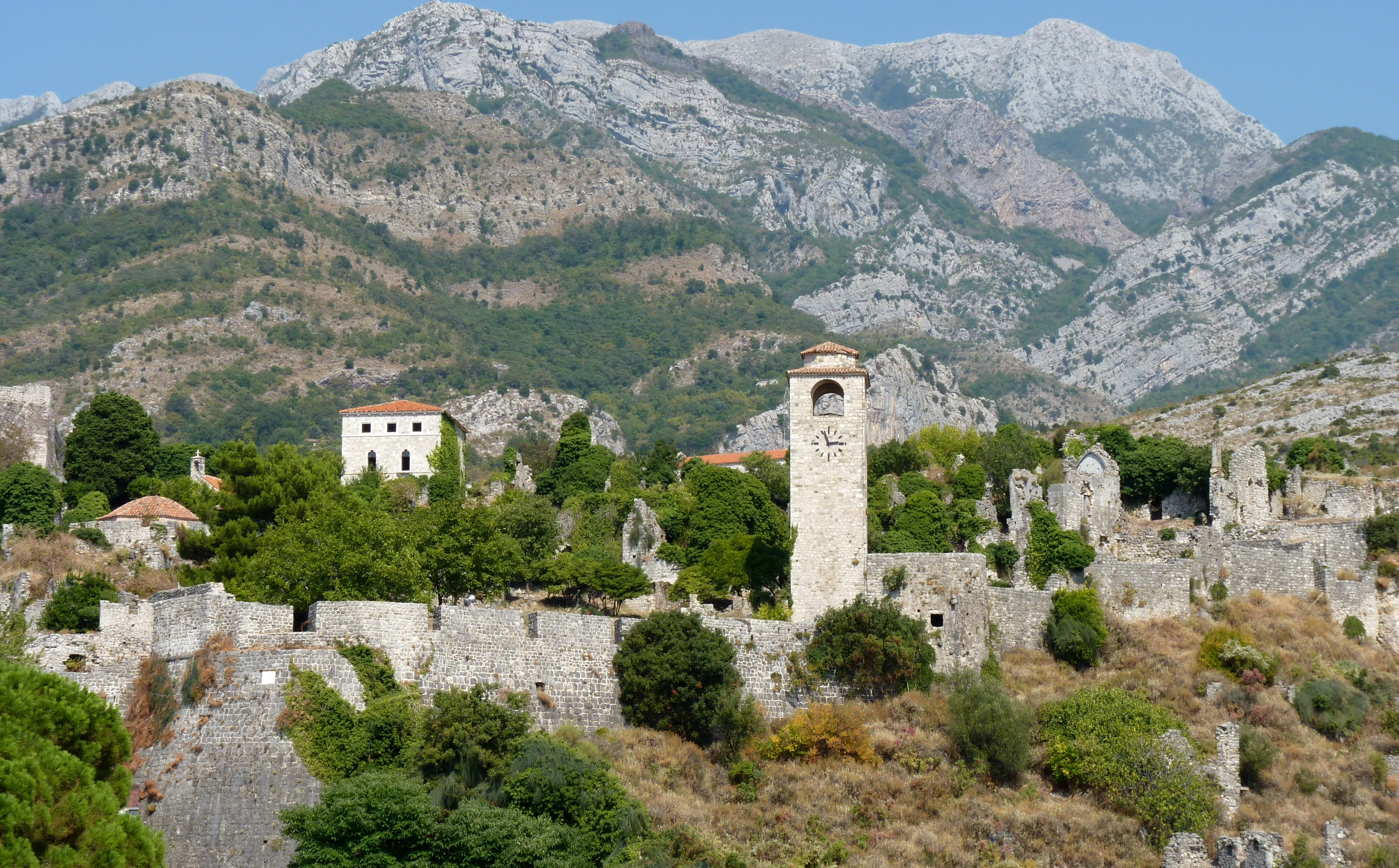
Old Bar

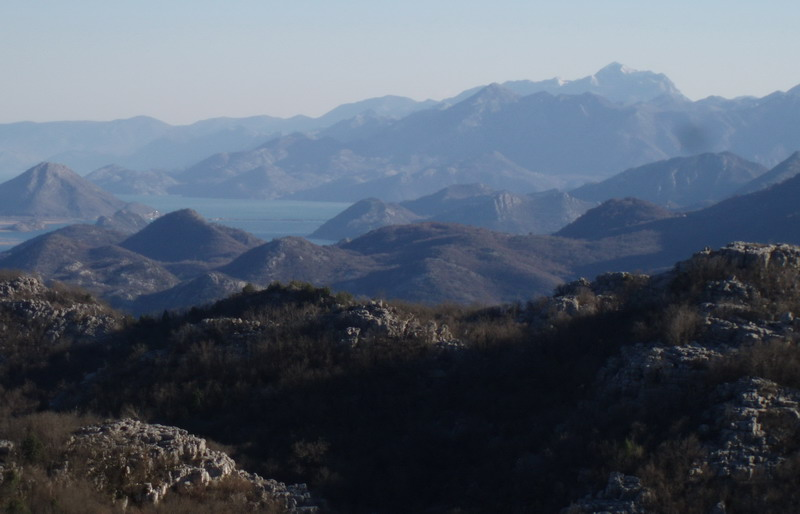
Rumija

=== Northern Region ===
The Northern Region is the centre of Montenegrin mountain tourism. It has ski resorts, and is popular for its untouched nature. The entire area of Durmitor mountain and the Tara river canyon is protected as a national park, and listed with UNESCO World Heritage Sites.

Destinations in the North:

- The town of Plav and visitor summit 2211m above sea level (mountain peak) above Plav. Magnificent panoramic view of the mountains of Albania, Serbia and Montenegro. Along side Bogićevica summit 2533m and Zla Kolata summit 2535m which is the highest Peak in Montenegro. Mosque Sultanija the last Ottoman mosque in the Balkans. Plav Lake It is the largest glacial lake in Montenegro, and is also the best-known tourist attraction in the area. The Redzepagic Tower is the oldest and most interesting housing-defence facility in the city of Plav. It was built in 1671. The tower is now hosting the local ethnographic collection with more than 2000 exhibits which reach back as far as the middle ages to the present day. Hrid lake is known by locals as Fairy Lake and lake of happiness, is at 1970m and is the highest lake of Prokletijes and Montenegro. A refreshing swim best in July and August and not reachable by vehicles. Ali-Pasha's Springs (Ali Pasini Izvori) is one of the premium attractions in Prokletije National Park. The river is formed directly by outbreak from the soil, from the many small springs, a couple kilometers from Gusinje. There are multiple ethnic villages (Etno Selo) to enjoy the traditional food, herbal therapy and horse riding.
- The town of Pljevlja with the coat of arms of the Đurđevića Tara Bridge over the Tara (river), the largest canyon in Europe, the second-deepest canyon in the world. The canyon is known for the attraction of countless fast springs from the rocks during rafting.
- Ljubišnja triple Highland mountain chain and largest forest mountain range in Montenegro with the center in the village of Bobovo. Sandica Ubo the historic hamlet on the cliffs of the Tara river is part of the Durmitor National Park. Climbing, hiking, and photographing forested areas is a tourist practice. The habitat of wild horses is located on Horse field on Ljubisnja. Dairy products and organic food are produced by local farmers.
- Municipium S ... Komini Pljevlja archaeological site from the Roman period found by Arthur Evans.
- Heritage museum Pljevlja the most representative and richest museum in Montenegro with a unique piece of Cage cup.
- Monastery of the Holy Trinity near Pljevlja is famous as a place of pilgrimage known as a monastery for which a very famous medieval Enlightenment fraternity has guarded the bishop's scepter and a chest with holy bridges of one hand of Saint Sava for centuries which were moved to Church of Saint Sava.
- Husein-paša's Mosque in Pljevlja with the famous blue artistic arabesque on the ceiling of the tallest dome of the mosque and with the tallest minaret (42m) in the Balkans.
- Monumental memorial complex dedicated to the partisan fighters killed during the Battle of Pljevlja, the tallest monument to the anti-fascist movement in the Socialist Federal Republic of Yugoslavia.
- Memorial monument dedicated to the founding of Brigate Garibaldi formed in the valley of the village Mrzovici near Pljevlja opened with a ceremony with respect by the Italian president Sandro Pertini.
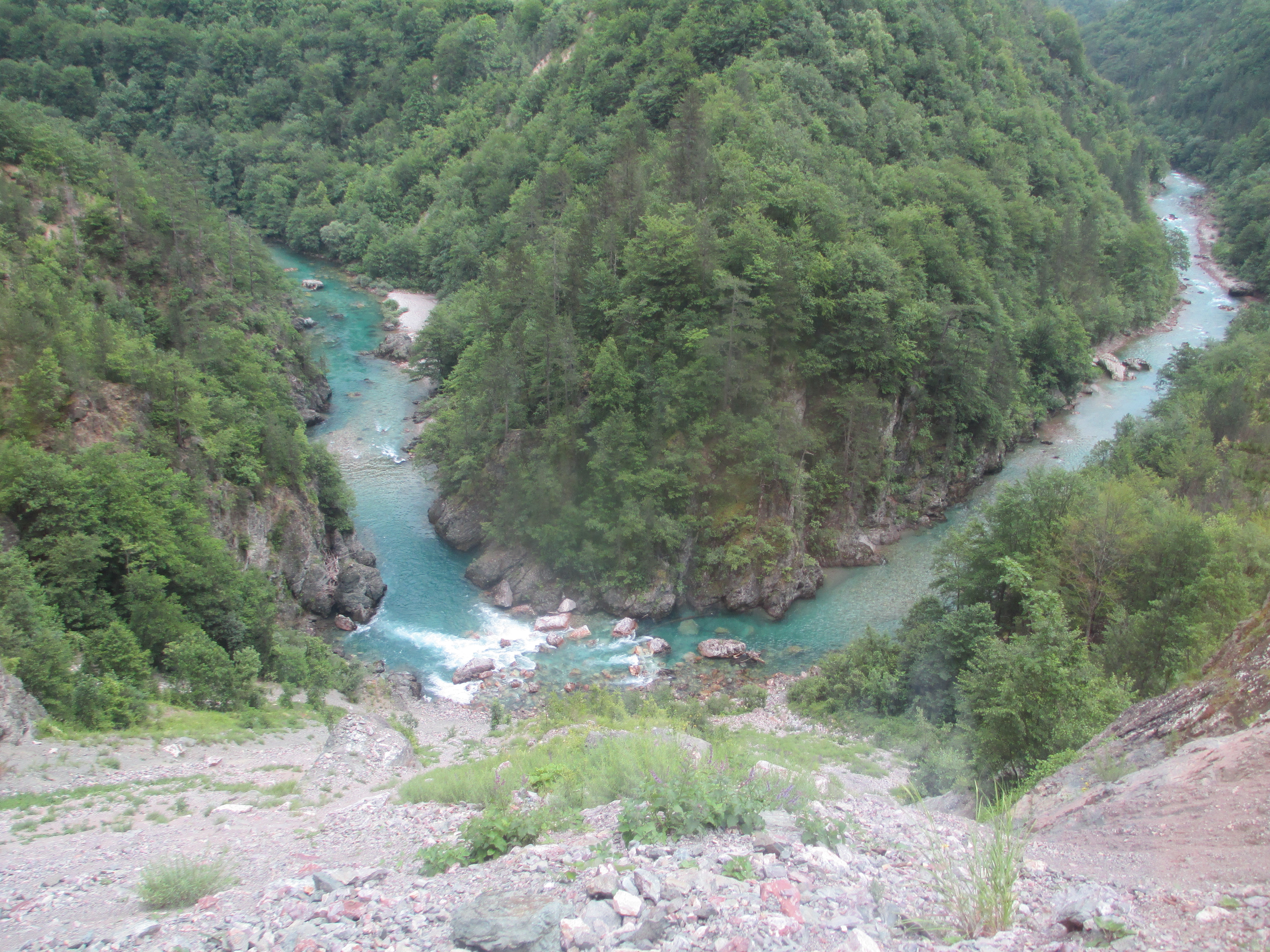
Tara Canyon

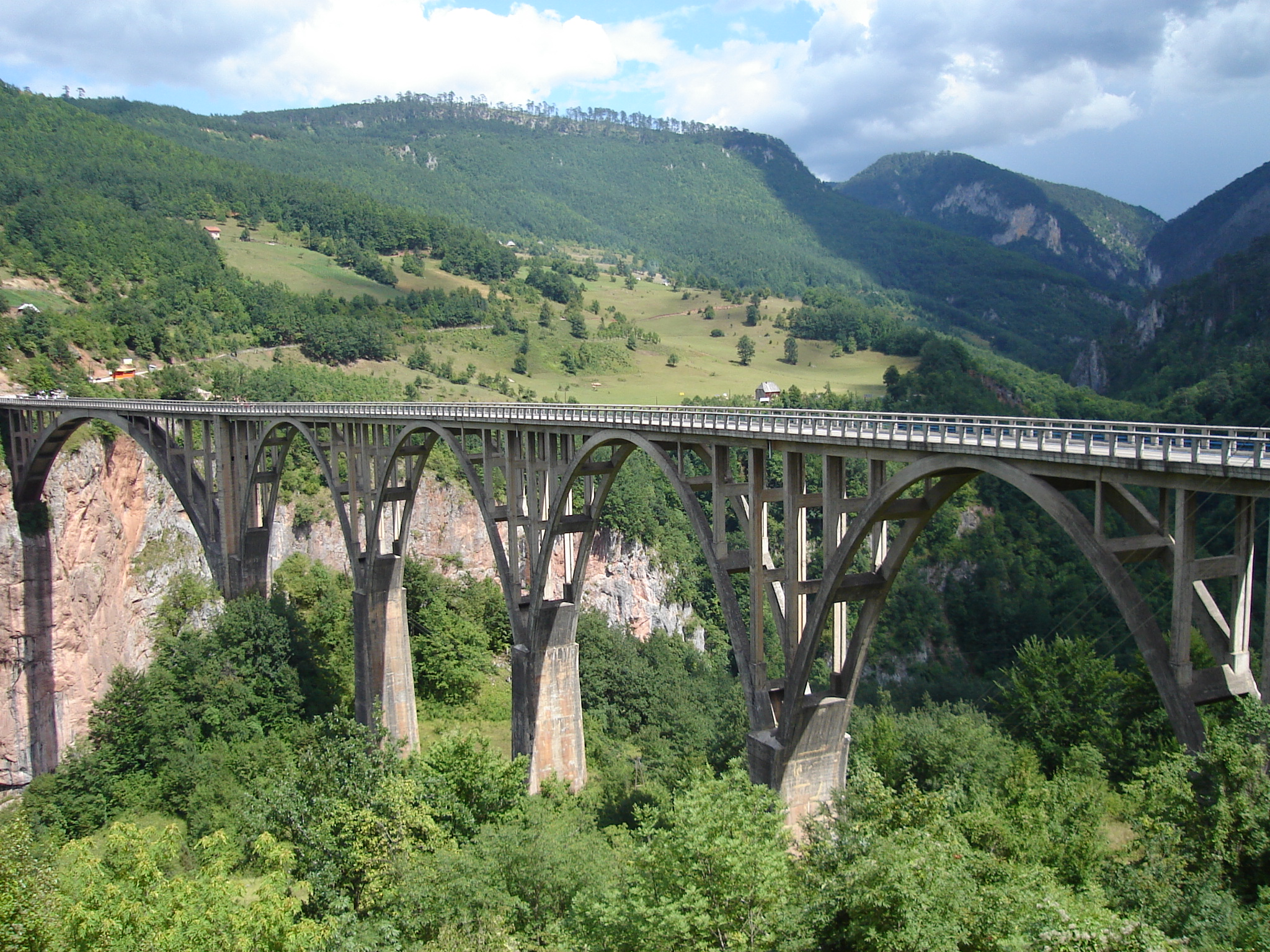
Đurđevića Tara Bridge

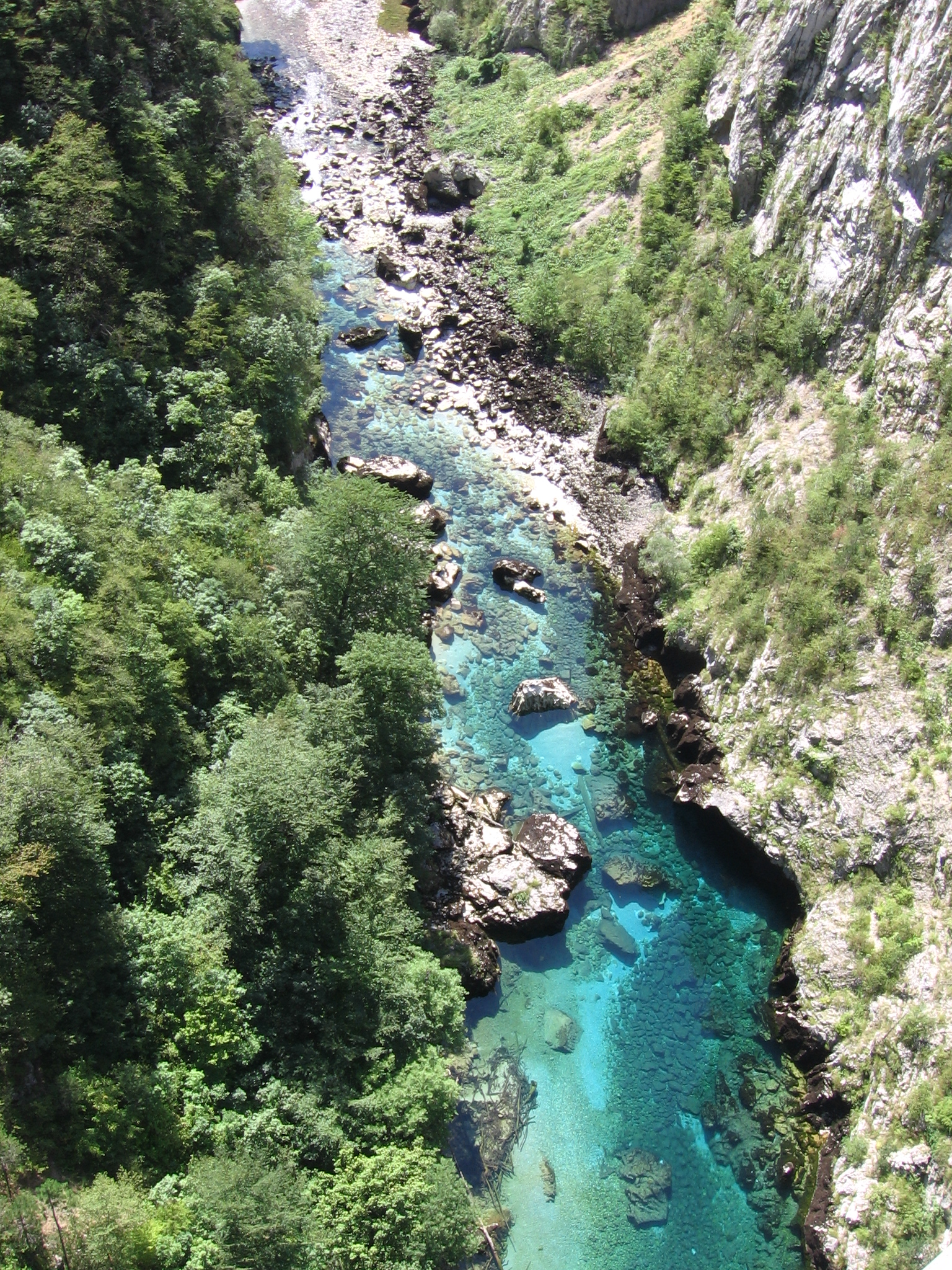
Piva Canyon

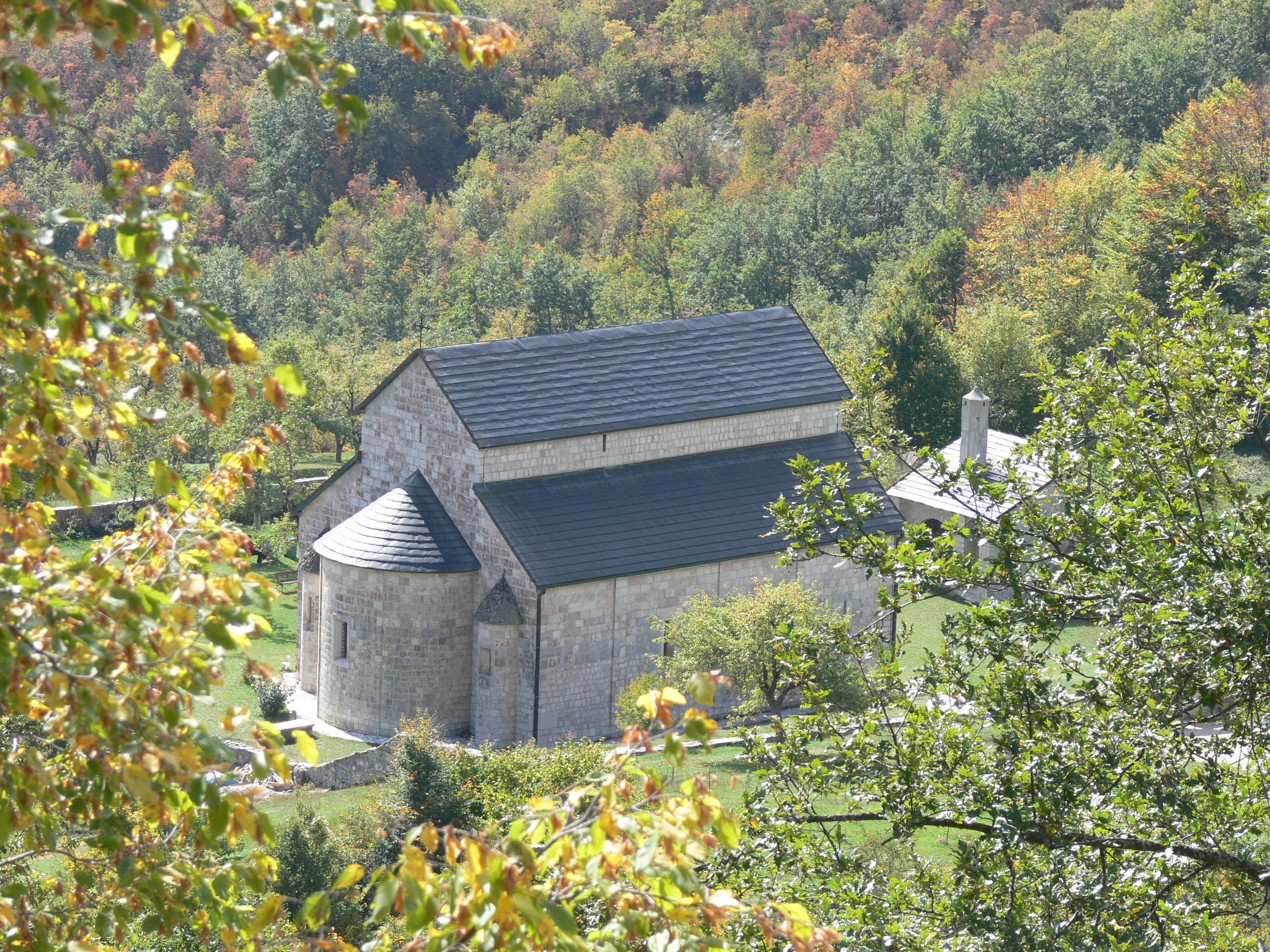
Piva Monastery
- The town of Žabljak on the Durmitor mountain, the most popular mountain tourism destination in Montenegro
- The town of Kolašin, another tourist destination, near the Biogradska Gora national park, the Bjelasica mountain and the ski-resort Bjelasica
- Biogradska Gora, with Biogradsko Lake, a national park and untouched virgin forest.
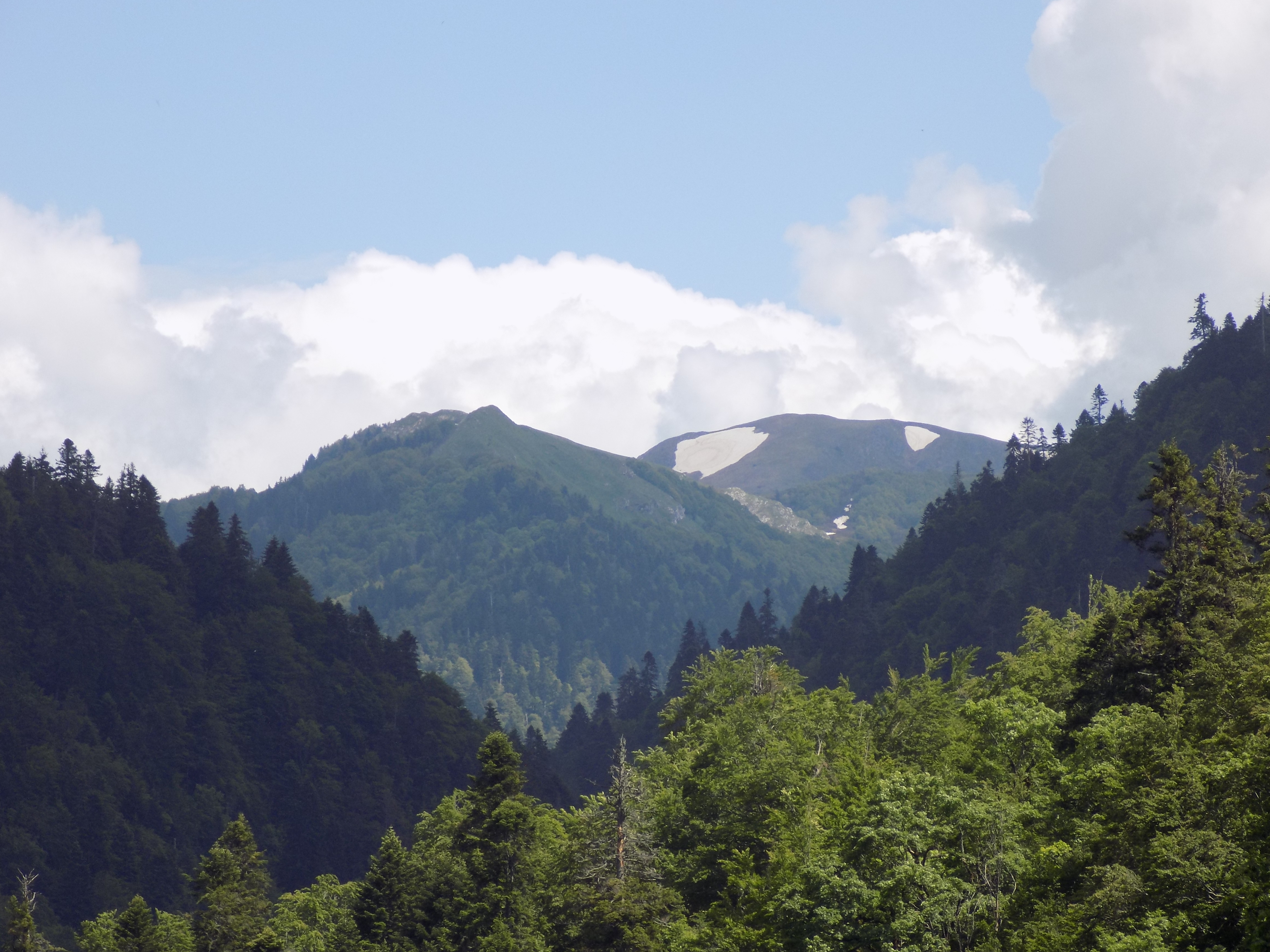
Biogradska Gora National Park

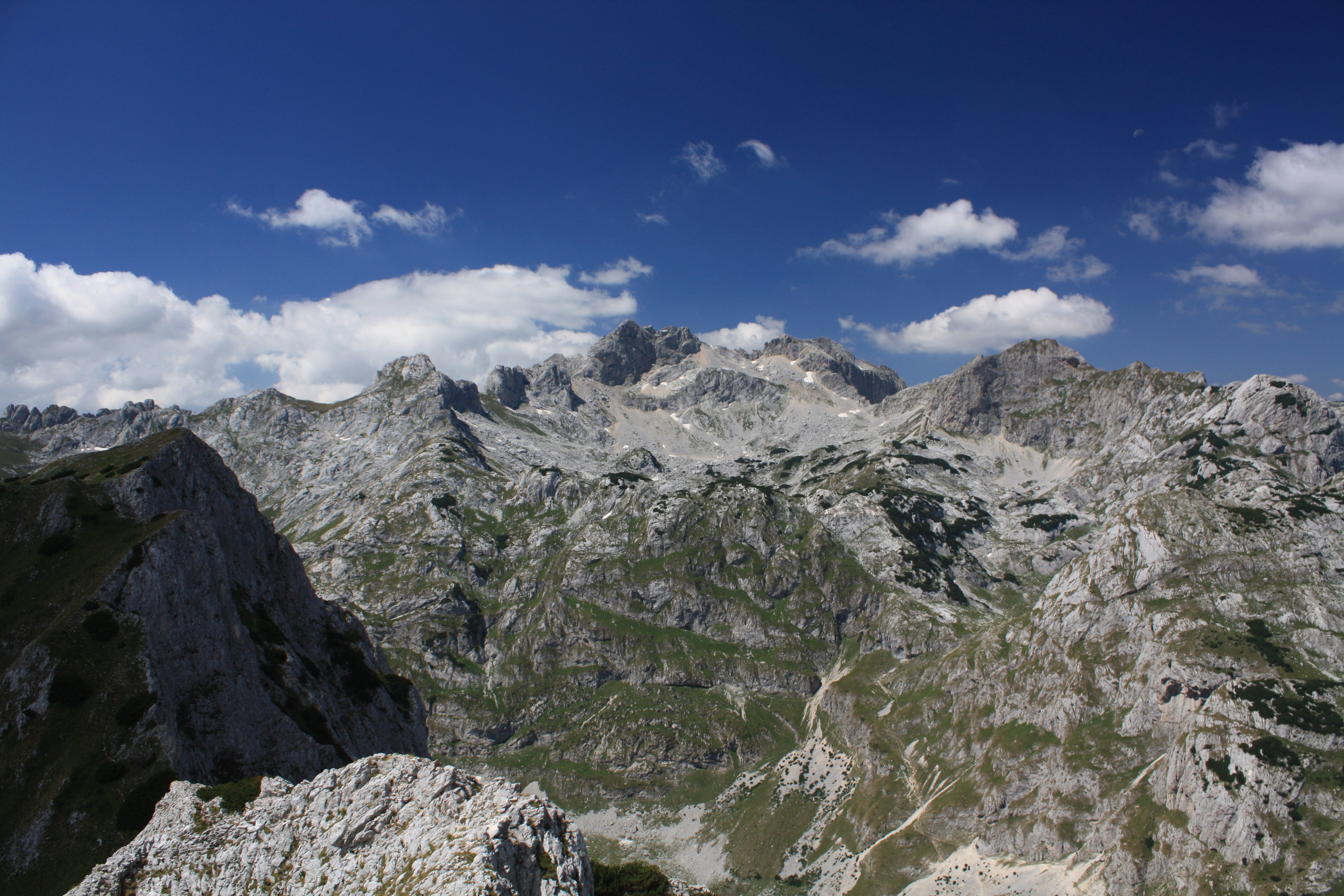
Durmitor National Park

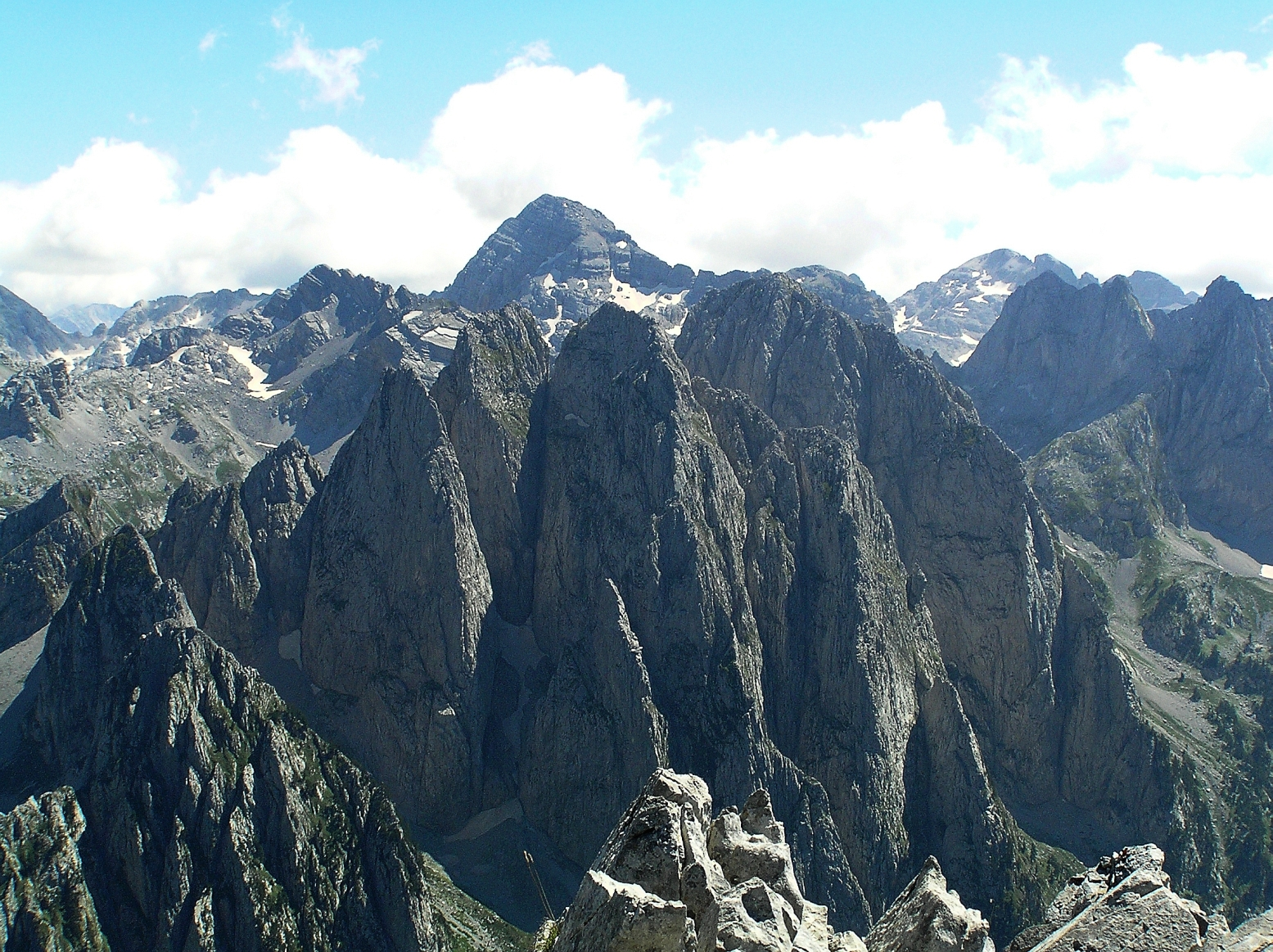
Prokletije National Park

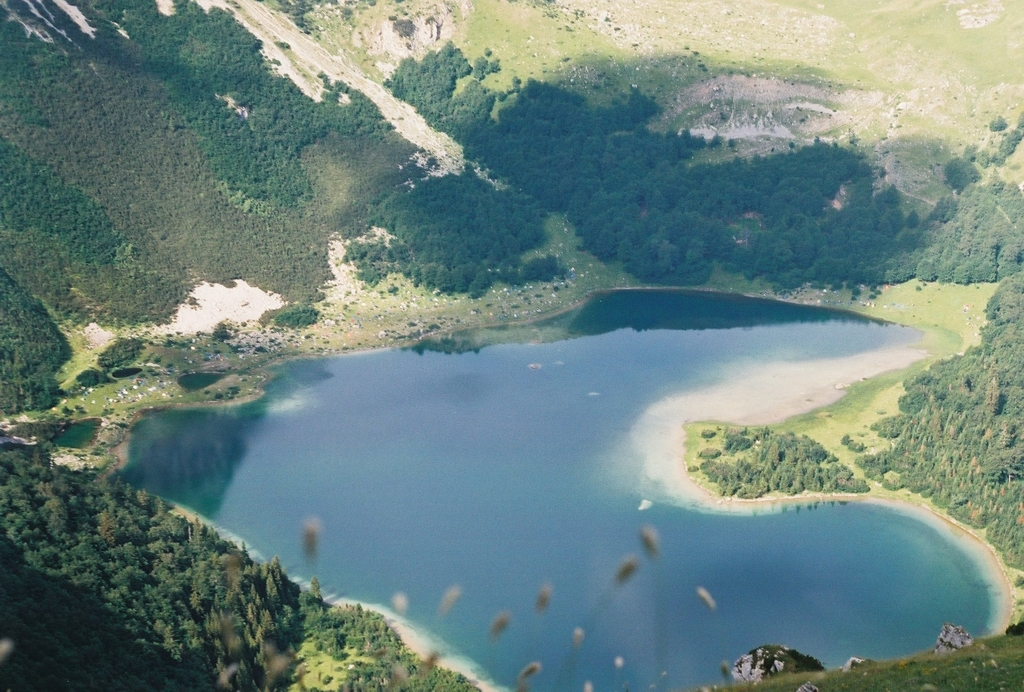
Trnovačko Lake

=== Central region ===
Although it is the most densely populated area of Montenegro, the central region has fewer tourist attractions. Notable are:

- Ostrog monastery, an Orthodox pilgrimage site
- Archeological remains of Duklja (Doclea) from Roman times outside Podgorica
- Cetinje the old royal capital of Montenegro
- Mount Lovćen, the national park and Petar II Petrović-Njegoš's Mausoleum have views of the surrounding area
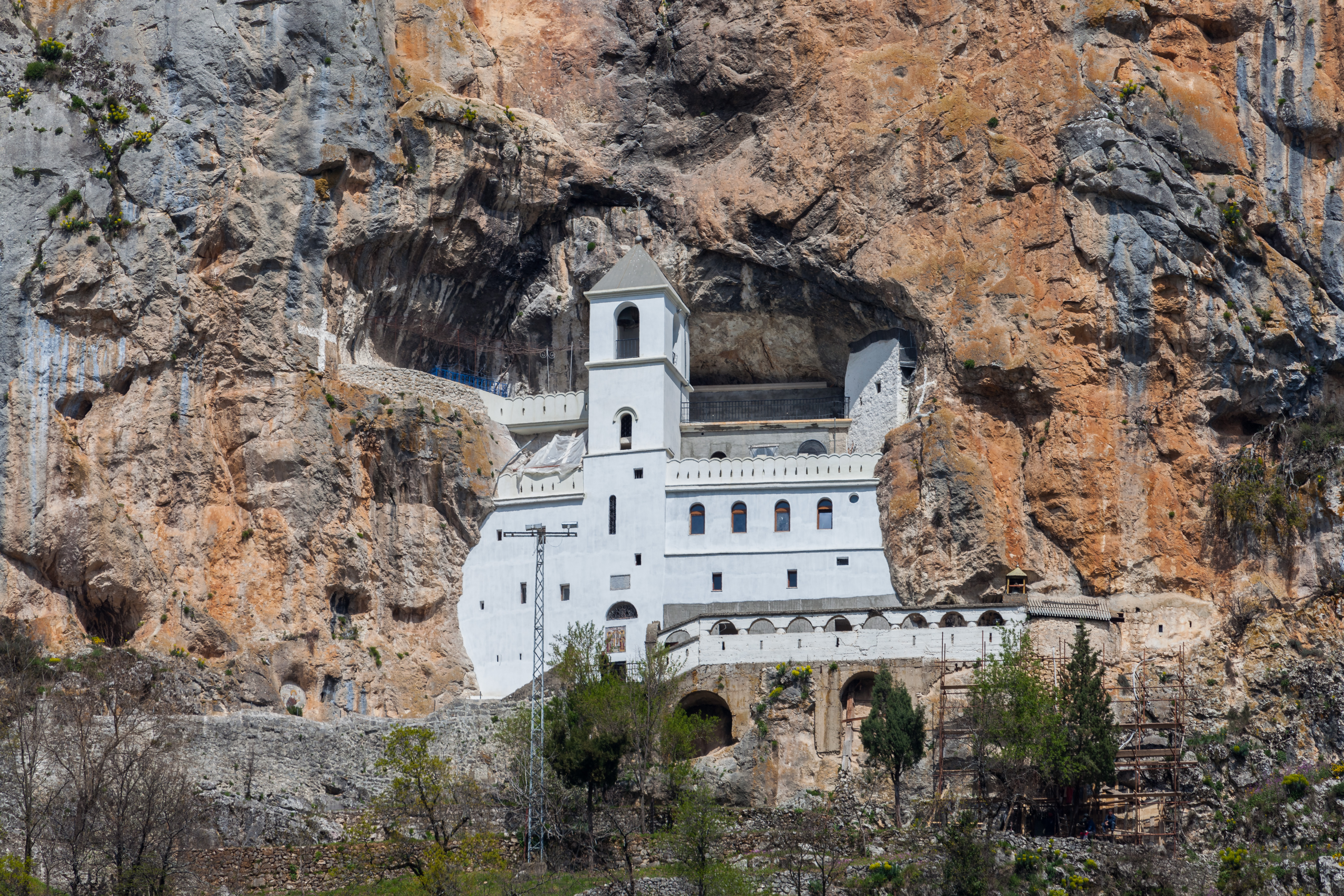
Ostrog Monastery

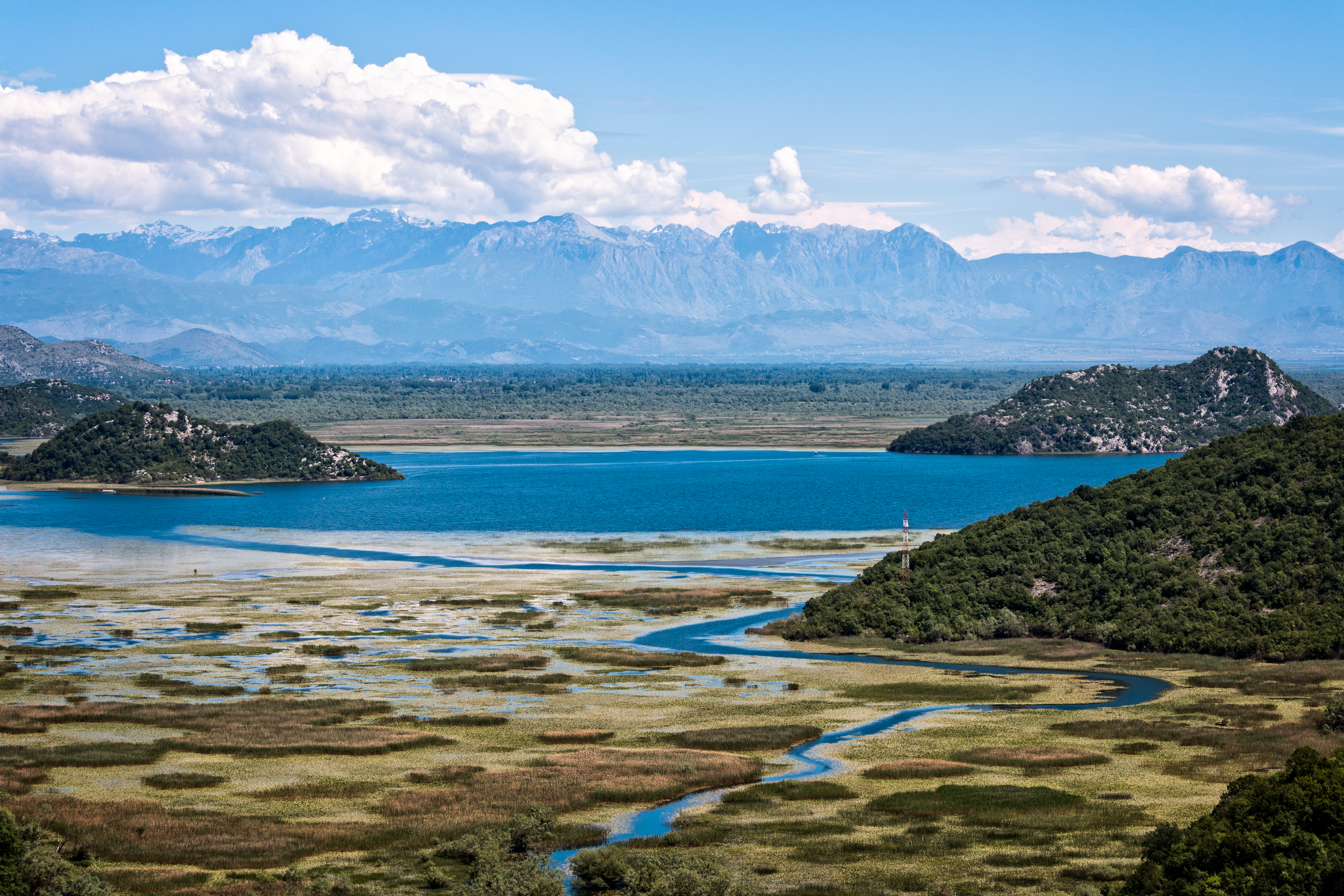
Lake Skadar National Park

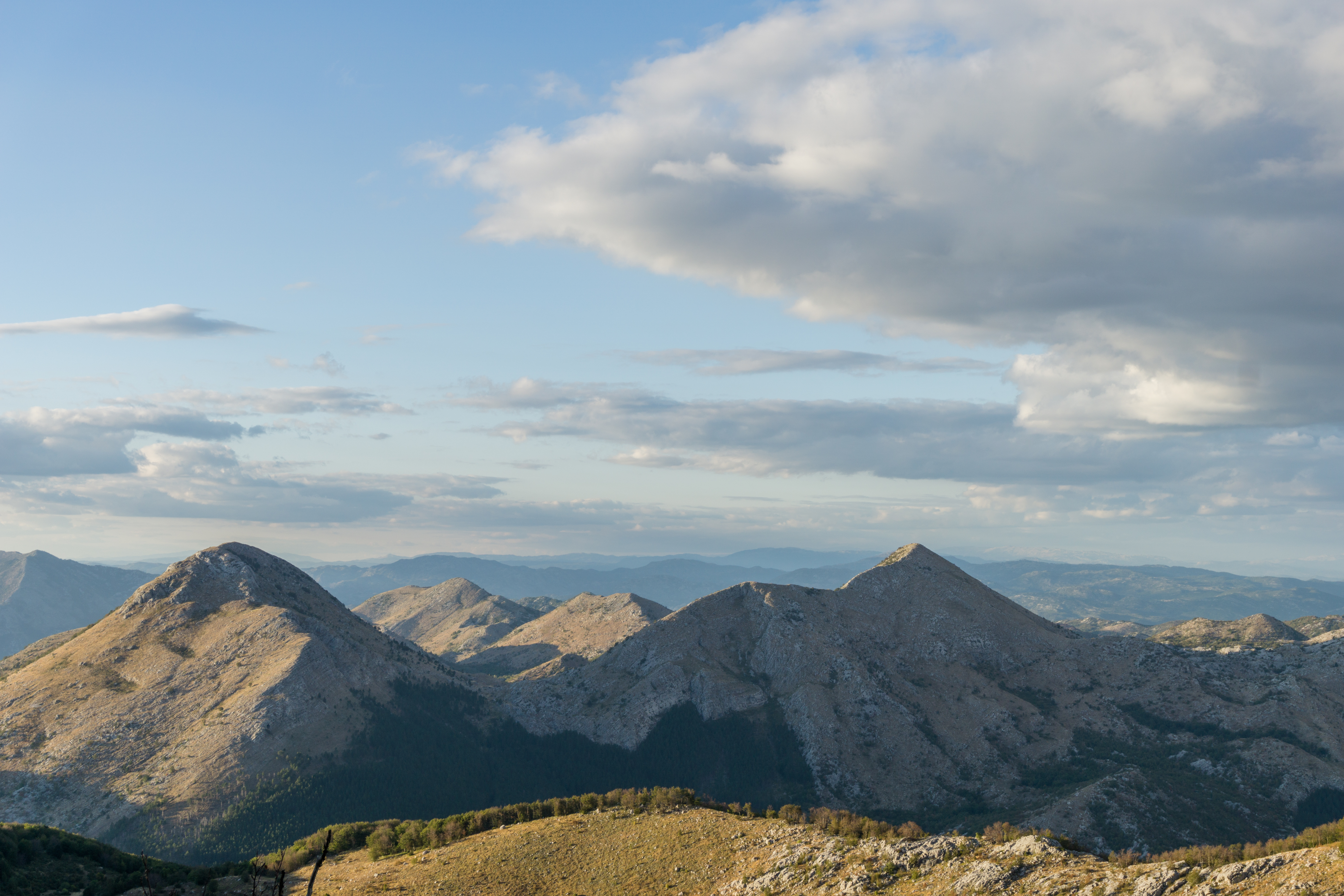
Lovćen National Park

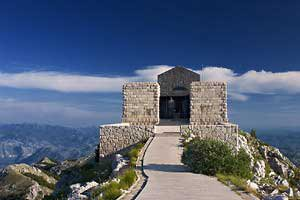
Njegoš's Mausoleum
- The Cetinje Monastery located in the old royal capital of Cetinje and the seat of the Metropolitanate of Montenegro
- The Morača Canyon
- The Morača Monastery overlooking the Morača Canyon
- Podgorica the country's capital
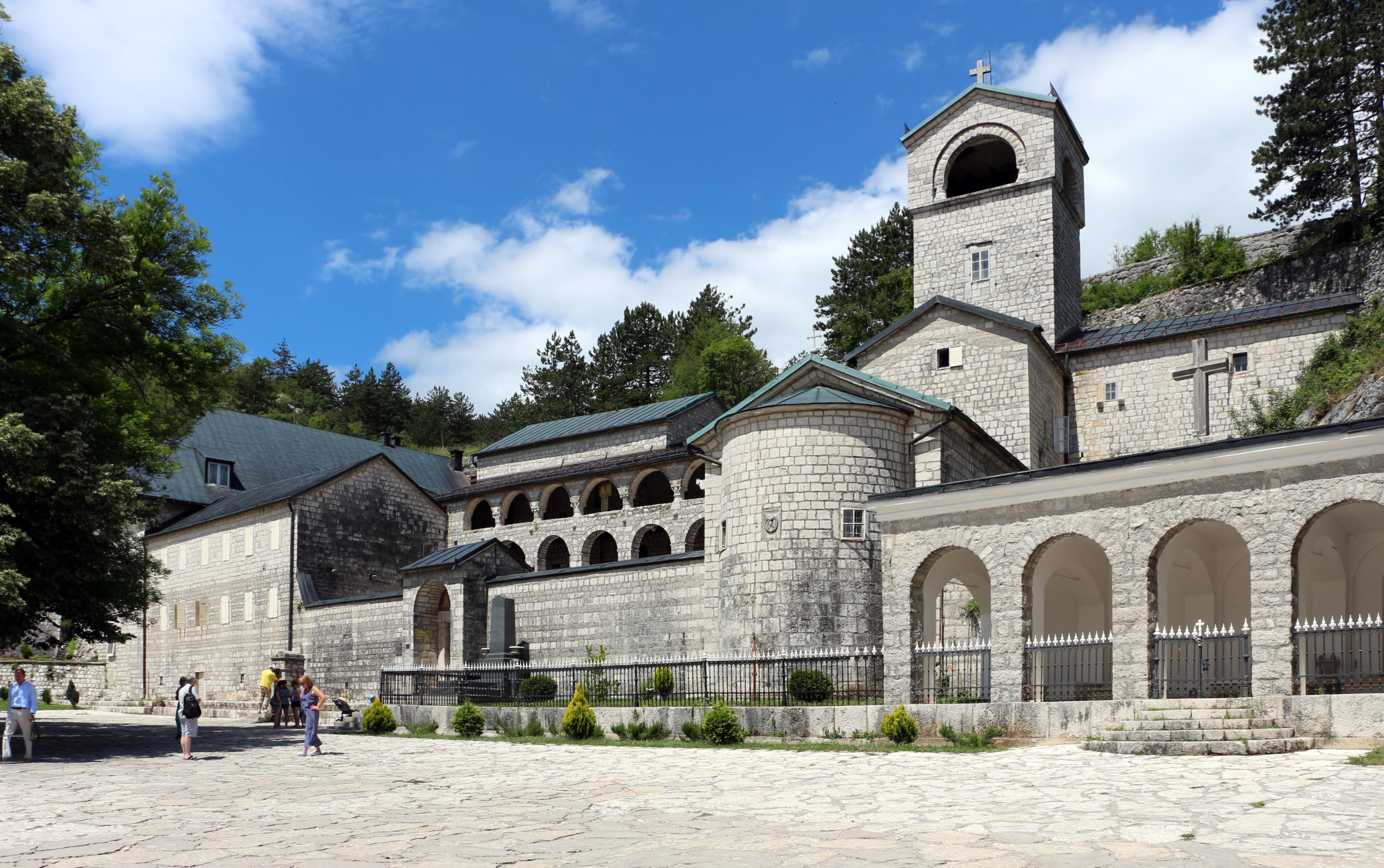
Cetinje Monastery

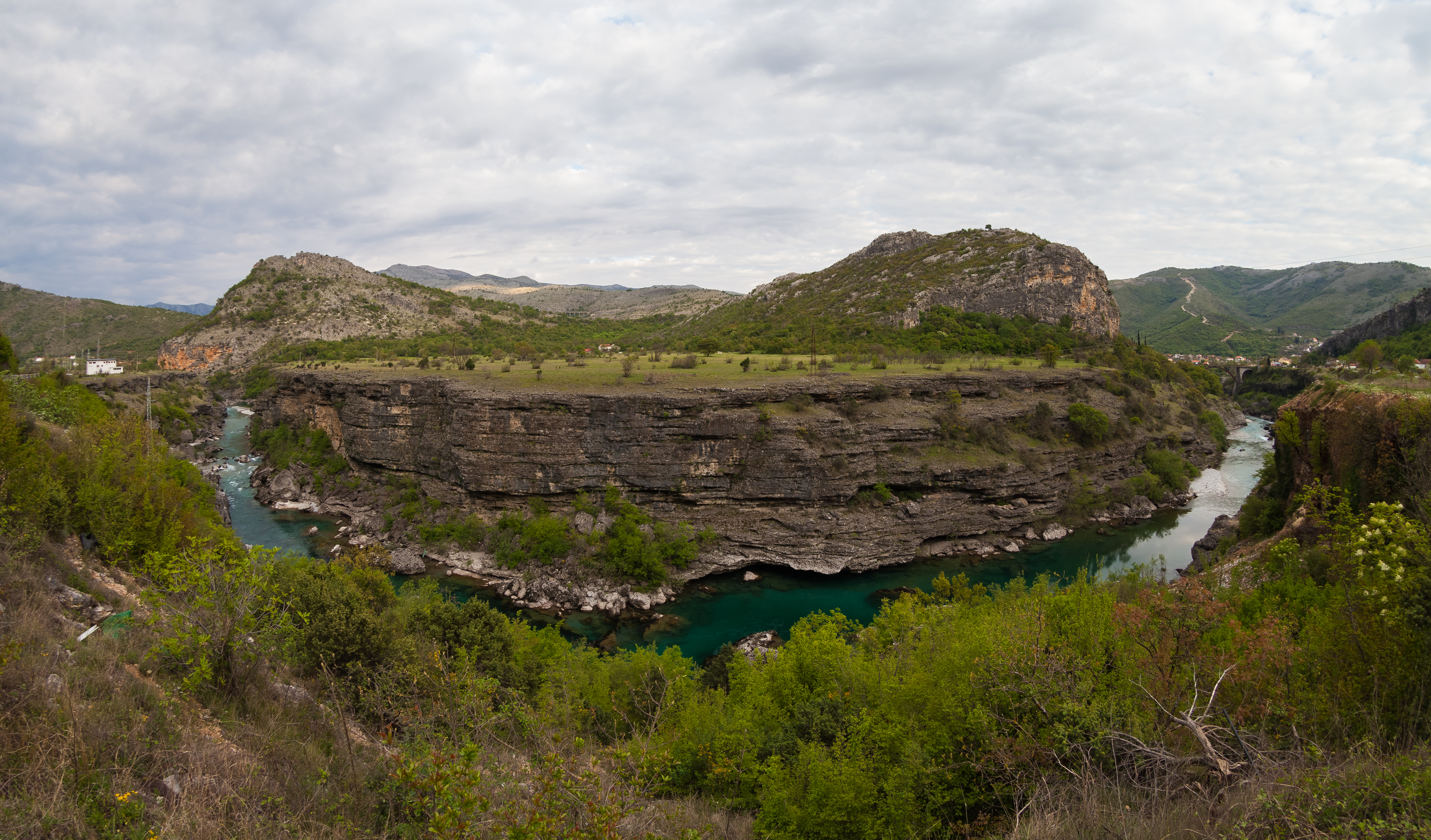
Morača Canyon

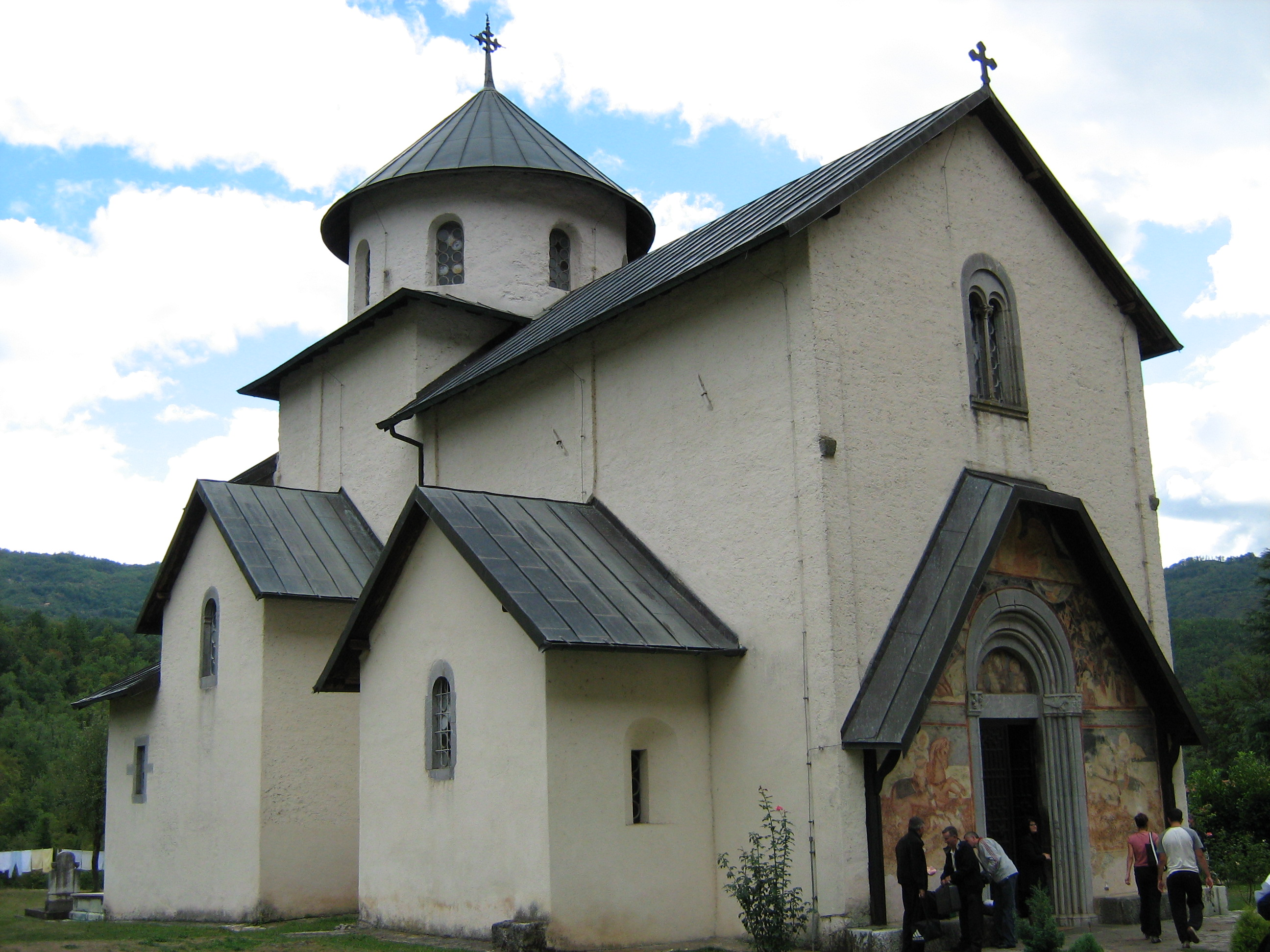
Morača Monastery

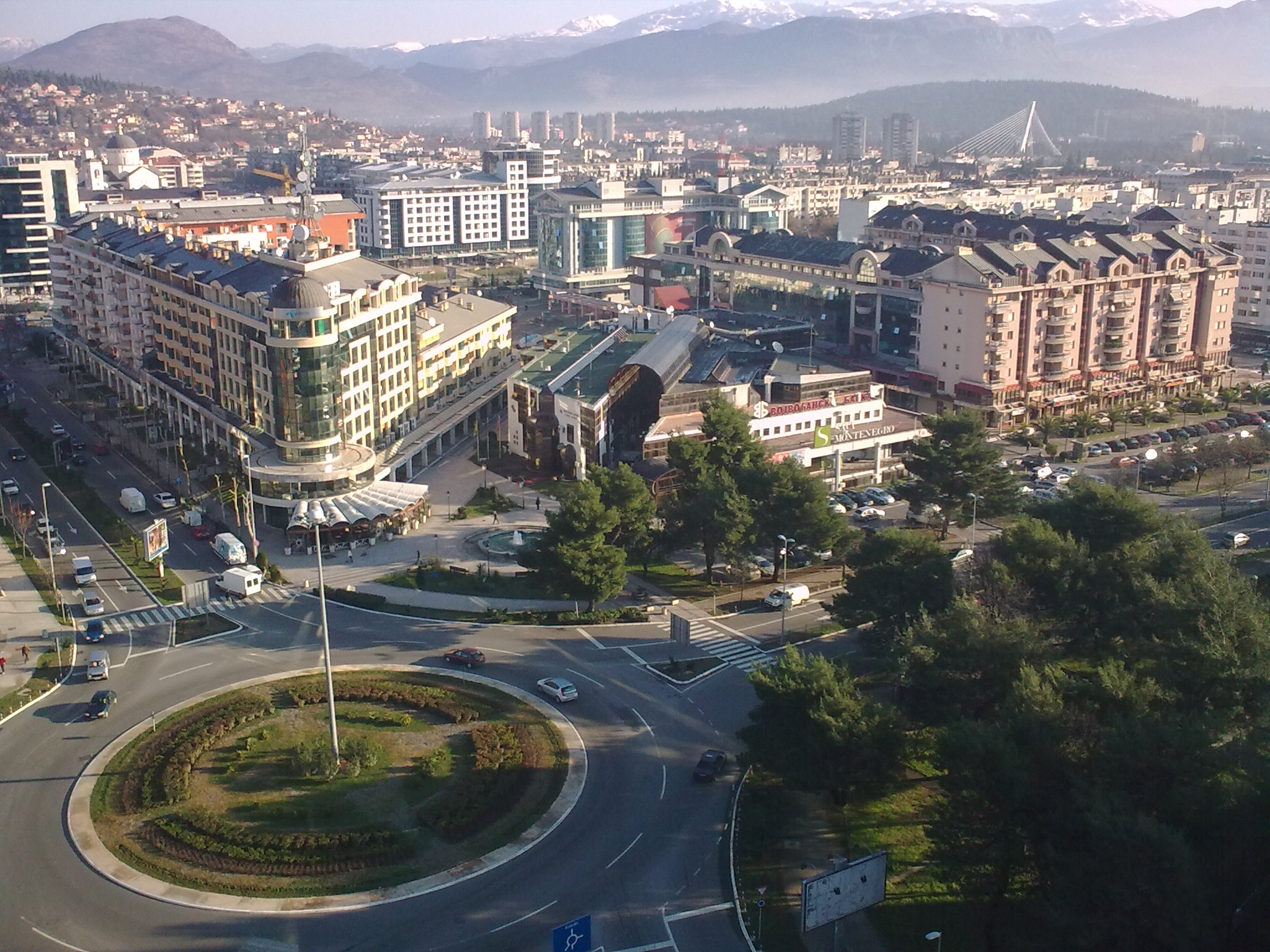
Podgorica

== Beaches ==
The length of coastline of Montenegro is 293 km. It has 73 km of beaches, there are over 120 such beaches. There are varying beach styles from sand to pebbles of differing lengths.

Ulcinj

The coast line of Ulcinj is 32 km long. It has more than 10 beaches. Ada Bojana is a river island. It is a triangle shape with sea from one side. The beach is sandy and long. Velika Plaza is the longest beach in Montenegro and is one of the warmest beaches on the Adriatic Sea. It is 12 km long and it is covered with sand. It is very shallow. Small city beach is as same as Velika Plaza but it is not so long. Valdanos is little cove with pebbly beach and flora around it.

Bar

Bar Riviera is 44 km long and has got 9 km of beaches. There are more than 20 beaches but Bar has got 2 beaches on the lakeside. The main beach in Bar is Sutomore beach. It's 1 km long and is covered with sand. Canj beach is 1 km long and is a tourist location. The beach is covered with fine sand but the sea bottom is covered with round rocky pebbles. Queen's beach is very near Canj but it can be only approached from sea. Red beach is specific because it is covered with red round pebbles and the view from it is outstanding. Zukotrlica beach is over 1 km long and it is near the city. It is covered with white pebbles and in the background is a little pine forest. Beach Utjeha is also called "Olive Bay" because there are hundreds of olives in the background. It is covered with pebbles and is very clear. On the lake there are two beaches: Pjesacac and Murici. They are covered with pebbles.

Budva

Budva Riviera has over 25 beaches and they are favourite destination for tourists in Montenegro. The longest beach is Jaz. It's 2.5 km long and is sandy. Mogren beach has specific small pebbles. It consist two little beaches and they are connected with a tunnel. Slovenska beach is 1.5 km long and is covered with sand. There are lot of hotels, restaurants and parks in the background. The Becici beach is long and sandy. Milocer beach, Queen's beach and Sveti Stefan beach are the most exclusive beaches in Montenegro. Pterovac beach is quiet long and is covered with little red pebbles. Special attraction there are two little isles and little fortress near beach. Buljarica beach is covered with sand and is 2 km long.

Tivat

There are over 15 small beaches in Tivat. Opatovo is a 200 m long pebble beach. Little lighthouse divides beach in two parts. Beach Plavi Horizonti is perhaps the most famous in Tivat. It is 300 m long and covered with small white pebbles. There are two islands near Tivat: The Island of St. Marko and Island of Flowers. They have very nice and attractive beaches.

Kotor

This is the deepest part of Boka Kotorska so there are fewer beaches. There are about 10 small beaches. Morinj beach is a pebbly beach with views of the bay. Risan beach is a quiet, long and rocky beach. Orahovac is the favourite beach in Kotor. It is pebbly with old stone houses in the background. Trsteno is also a pebbly beach. It is 200 m long with clear water and natural background.

Herceg Novi

Herceg Novi Riviera is 25 km long and it has over 20 beaches. Igalo beach is 1.5 km long and sandy. Rose beach is rocky with very nice forest background. Zanjic beach is located in Herceg Novi. It is 300 m long and it is covered with white pebbles.

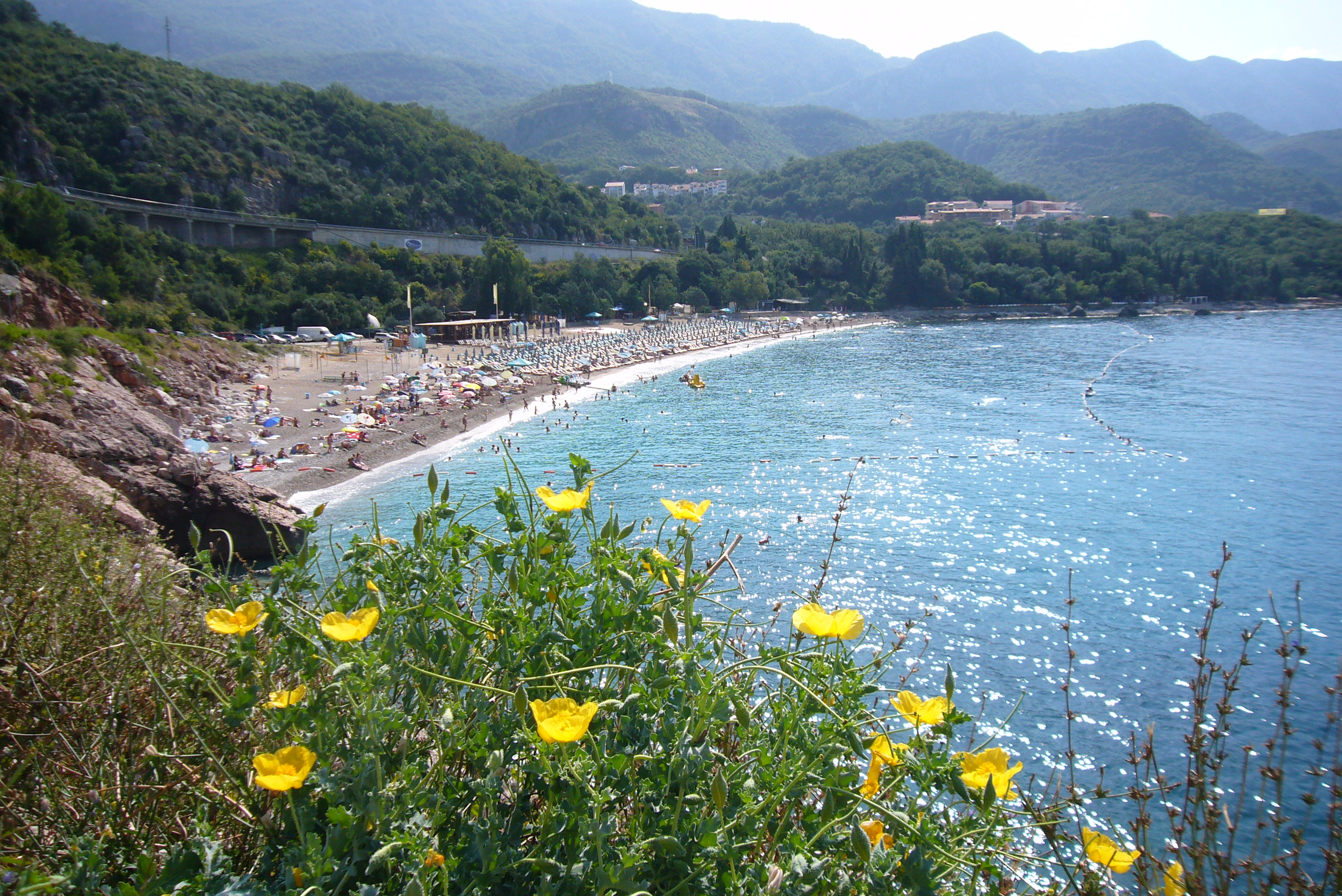
Kamenovo

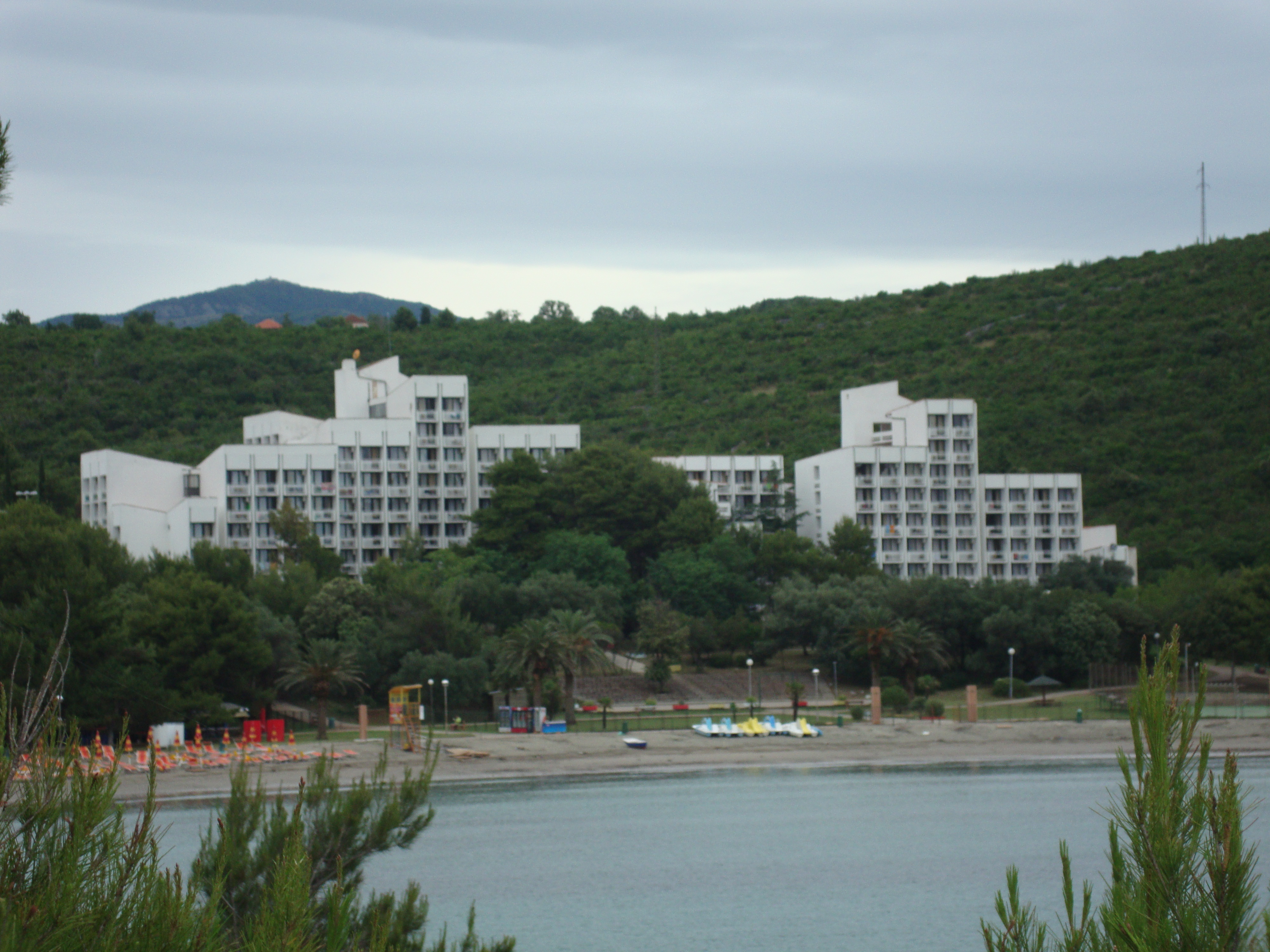
Plavi Horizonti

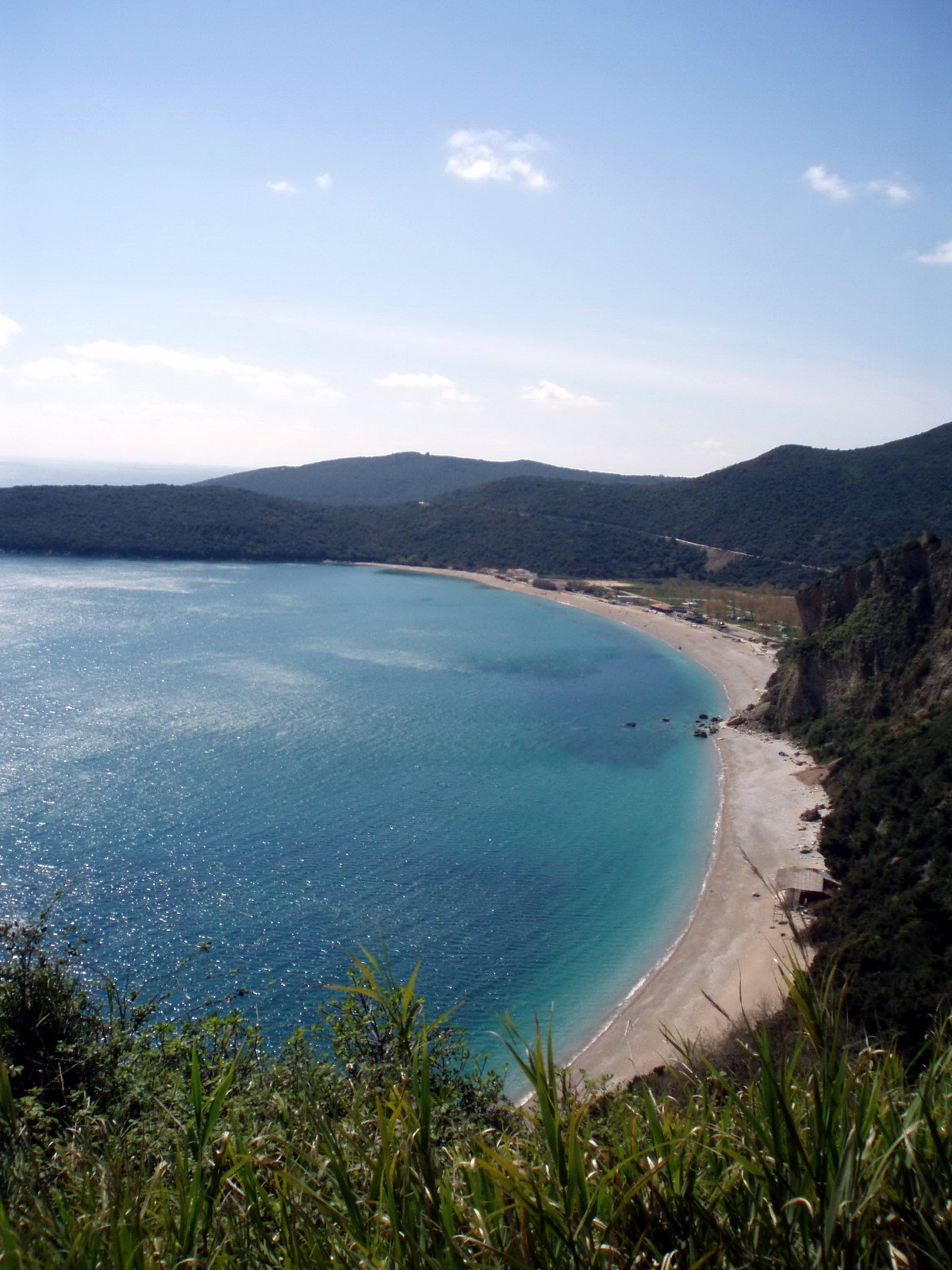
Jaz

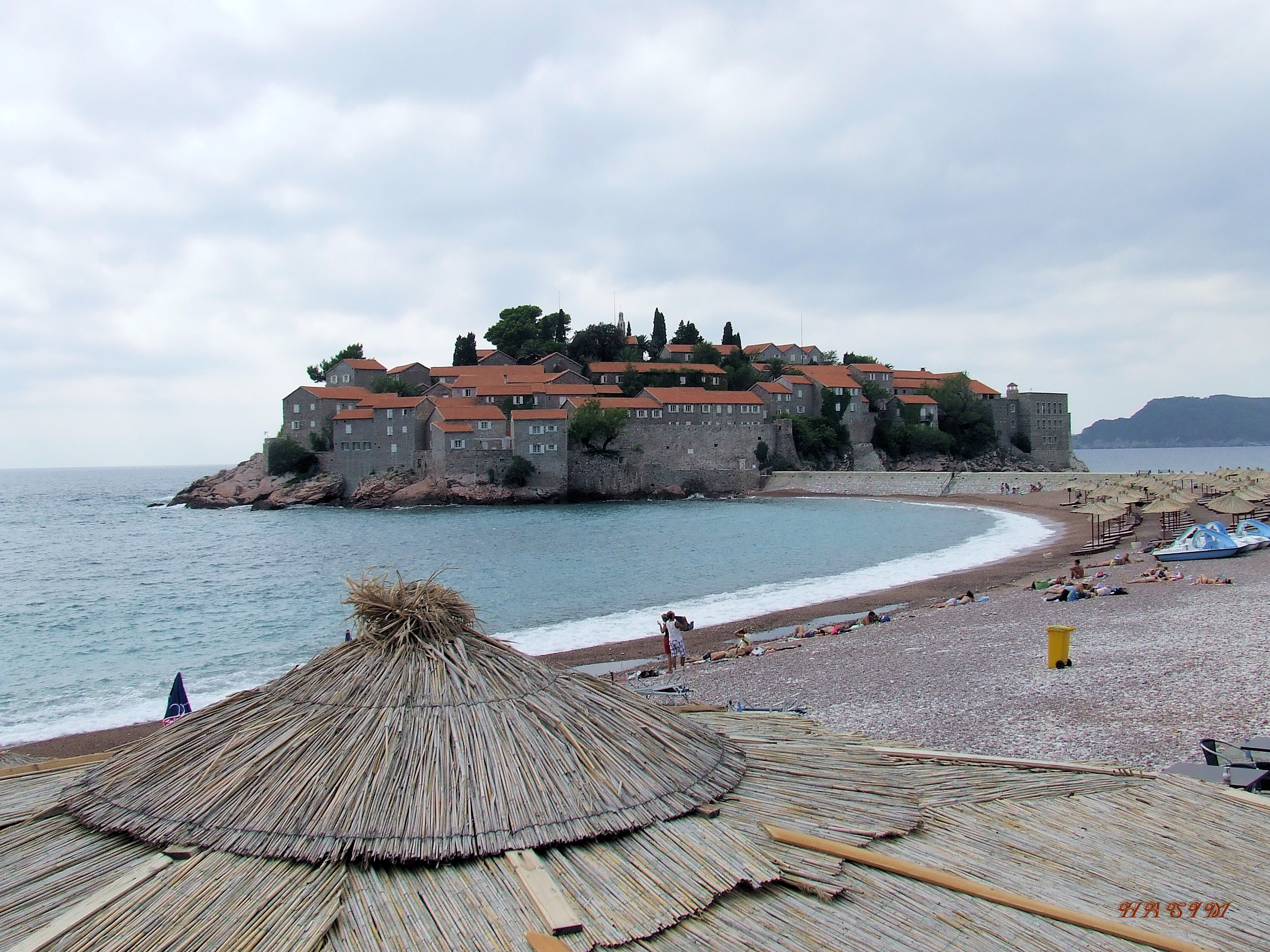
Sveti Stefan

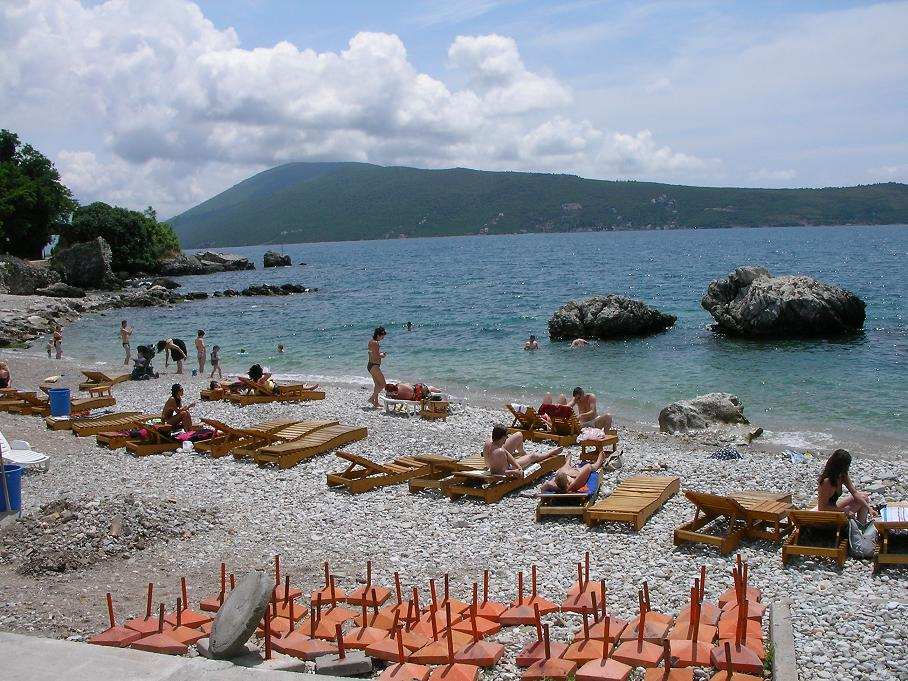
Herceg Novi

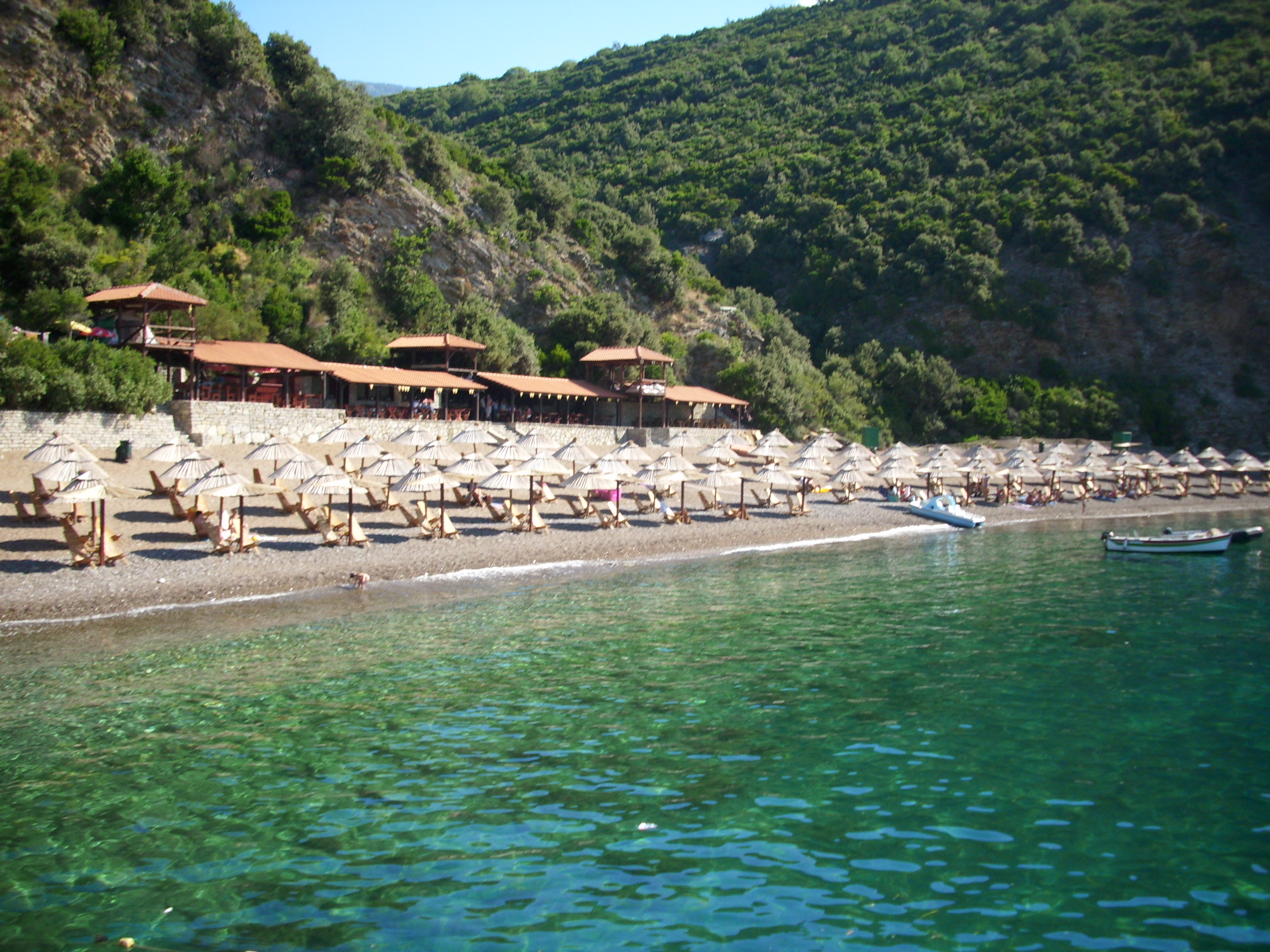
Čanj

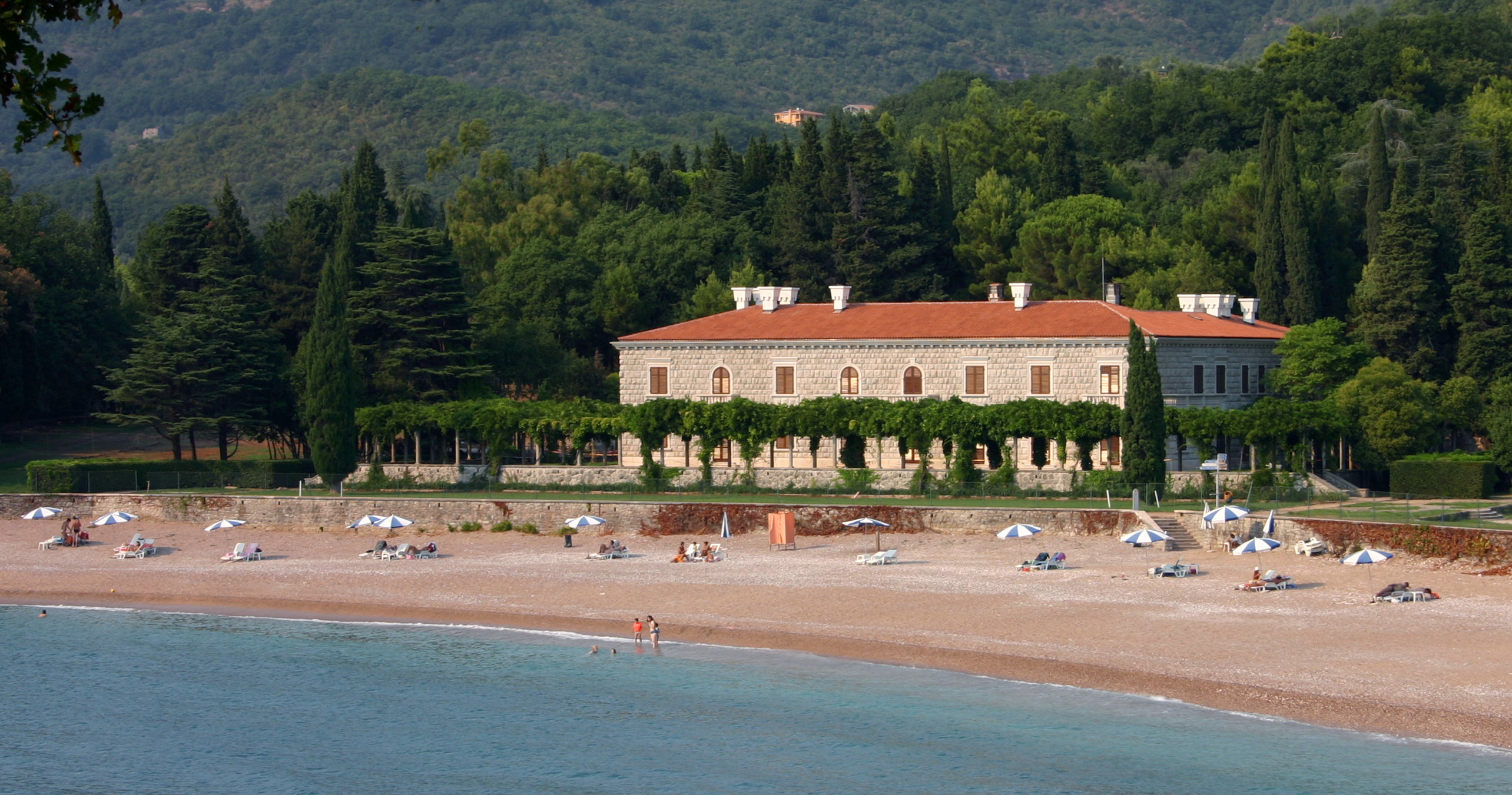
Miločer

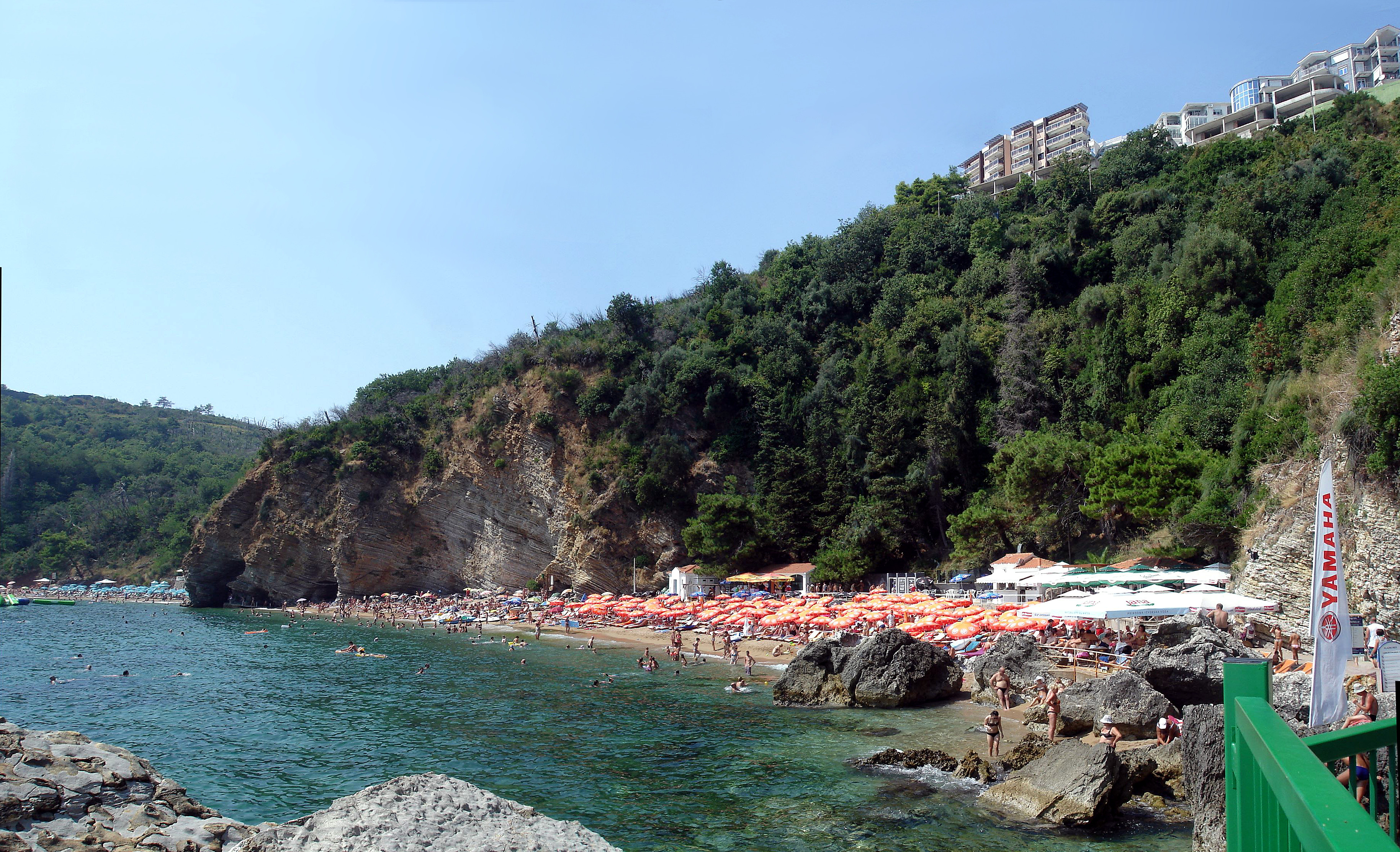
Mogren

== Statistics by year ==
Tourist arrivals of 2024 in %

Year	Total tourist arrivals	Domestic	Foreign
2006	953,961	156,857	797,071
2007	1,133,432	149,294	984,138
2008	1,188,116	156,904	1,031,212
2009	1,207,694	163,680	1,044,014
2010	1,262,985	175,191	1,087,794
2011	1,373,454	172,355	1,201,099
2012	1,439,500	175,337	1,264,163
2013	1,492,006	167,603	1,324,403
2014	1,517,376	167,079	1,350,297
2015	1,713,109	153,185	1,559,924
2016	1,813,817	151,696	1,662,121
2017	2,000,009	122,797	1,877,212
2018	2,204,856	128,053	2,076,803
2019	2,645,217	135,592	2,509,625
2020	444,065	93,270	350,795
2021	1,670,879	117,321	1,553,558
2022	2,183,975	147,572	2,036,403
2023	2,613,306	166,203	2,447,103
2024	2,606,854	160,291	2,446,563
2025	2,728,564	176,063	2,552,501

Tourist Arrivals to Montenegro by Country of Residence (2017–2025)
Rank	Country	2025	2024	2023	2022	2021	2020	2019	2018	2017
1	Serbia	461,262	449,164	438,519	434,949	429,106	57,990	402,866	409,385	405,426
2	Russian Federation	203,945	198,025	246,653	169,726	108,025	38,757	384,689	338,463	350,468
3	Bosnia and Herzegovina	200,788	207,392	221,201	211,314	214,570	50,082	203,766	193,587	183,690
4	Germany	147,734	144,172	152,158	152,038	70,653	18,206	163,877	89,741	57,813
5	Turkey	134,266	164,902	94,659	43,536	26,225	12,404	39,984	43,755	45,947
6	United Kingdom	118,746	111,844	89,013	75,622	13,954	7,748	80,876	62,460	42,360
7	Israel	110,249	73,513	65,501	56,042	21,227	558	40,764	34,904	30,506
8	France	98,517	93,778	96,461	75,861	35,985	9,611	90,083	77,096	60,865
9	Kosovo	86,956	98,865	122,167	111,454	107,111	22,675	169,601	55,531	46,948
10	Poland	86,609	82,524	84,741	62,617	40,776	7,174	76,620	69,091	56,061
11	China (including Hong Kong)	82,054	64,716	32,277	8,256	2,081	3,060	74,833	42,715	23,495
12	Ukraine	72,599	61,848	63,007	56,667	135,997	22,950	57,188	61,473	57,795
13	USA	61,707	53,138	48,898	39,087	20,057	3,755	35,757	29,536	23,842
14	Albania	53,214	51,624	56,986	62,852	56,547	38,049	79,001	65,419	56,206
15	Other Asian countries	43,727	36,502	41,671	27,486	20,095	1,633	21,430	22,637	18,387
16	Croatia	38,963	38,942	40,495	35,052	20,221	7,460	39,082	33,398	28,597
17	Republic of North Macedonia	32,851	33,821	33,489	30,823	27,965	3,167	35,250	28,738	25,486
18	Hungary	32,492	32,584	37,038	31,177	23,745	2,448	32,860	34,032	27,184
19	Austria	30,696	28,828	27,868	27,203	13,660	1,686	35,001	24,624	18,256
20	Netherlands	29,208	24,772	32,400	22,249	10,059	1,365	25,633	17,733	13,856
21	Italy	27,674	27,334	27,807	24,250	9,910	2,820	39,692	37,602	35,525
22	Switzerland (including Liechtenstein)	23,318	23,451	23,961	22,879	16,866	1,826	25,614	16,686	14,749
23	Romania	22,574	21,456	21,731	19,836	13,281	956	27,731	21,576	22,605
24	Czech Republic	22,326	22,829	21,324	13,871	6,914	1,331	16,137	18,562	18,858
25	Belgium	22,203	21,108	28,477	22,345	10,808	2,609	30,528	18,722	16,189
26	Azerbaijan	20,937	13,607	5,277	2,864	1,391	643	2,535	1,725	806
27	Sweden	19,261	24,229	27,854	15,216	8,863	3,461	43,486	29,243	21,560
28	Slovenia	19,060	19,844	25,321	22,706	11,748	2,051	23,821	21,928	21,571
29	Australia	17,946	14,848	12,878	6,902	1,563	458	10,020	8,916	7,483
30	Spain	17,604	14,553	17,608	12,945	6,227	1,081	12,440	8,714	6,155
31	Lithuania	17,527	17,184	18,499	9,813	6,184	332	6,595	7,505	3,815
32	Other African countries	14,867	10,952	7,924	4,077	2,228	535	2,891	2,790	2,236
33	Canada	13,513	12,293	10,402	8,698	3,765	755	10,038	8,632	7,158
34	Slovakia	11,778	11,458	12,478	8,595	3,000	509	8,652	9,347	8,597
35	Greece	11,347	8,085	8,707	7,227	2,215	752	7,332	7,528	6,547
36	Norway	11,098	11,347	18,430	10,672	2,604	445	23,376	13,923	10,579
37	Finland	10,953	10,273	16,610	7,350	2,213	2,159	23,730	12,713	9,768
38	India	10,945	7,536	5,390	3,360	2,042	147	2,470	2,269	1,382
39	Other European countries	10,793	8,024	8,151	7,632	8,175	1,216	8,515	8,406	6,921
40	Bulgaria	10,387	11,226	11,078	6,789	3,425	1,064	10,341	11,155	10,370
41	Estonia	9,976	9,759	12,252	6,727	4,095	346	4,202	4,122	3,155
42	Latvia	9,961	7,815	6,295	4,348	2,501	325	3,847	3,300	2,514
43	Ireland	9,041	8,431	7,082	8,192	1,771	701	9,663	4,569	3,360
44	Denmark	7,858	8,309	15,940	6,464	3,223	1,944	16,166	8,462	6,342
45	Belarus	6,841	7,503	9,563	9,740	5,503	8,546	20,557	27,970	31,211
46	Portugal	6,596	5,901	4,015	3,427	1,639	300	3,638	2,944	2,071
47	Other Central or South American countries	5,974	5,575	3,946	3,300	1,929	379	3,151	2,631	2,934
48	Brazil	5,033	4,281	3,582	2,148	1,241	220	2,489	1,658	1,668
49	South Korea	3,749	3,889	4,442	973	296	199	3,338	5,016	5,844
50	South Africa	3,167	2,506	2,279	3,146	1,609	195	1,211	947	915
51	New Zealand	3,112	2,695	2,264	1,528	578	103	2,072	1,704	1,394
52	Oceania and other territories	3,071	2,331	3,998	3,819	759	92	2,605	1,827	1,482
53	Japan	2,859	2,779	2,063	686	312	298	2,873	2,938	2,971
54	Luxembourg	2,681	2,851	2,736	2,871	2,336	599	2,468	1,851	1,289
55	Other Northern American countries	2,400	2,554	1,586	904	480	53	1,016	852	1,065
56	Argentina	1,673	1,367	1,043	752	499	67	1,457	963	631
57	United Arab Emirates	1,640	2,098	5,664	2,302	1,252	106	N/A	N/A	N/A
58	Cyprus	1,401	1,110	1,121	852	662	174	1,162	805	851
59	Iceland	1,175	947	793	1,022	223	46	1,013	661	700
60	Malta	867	676	713	779	946	128	1,143	881	518
61	Chile	732	595	617	385	223	46	449	442	235
Total		2,552,501	2,446,563	2,447,103	2,036,403	1,553,558	350,795	2,509,625	2,076,803	1,877,212

== National parks ==
- List of national parks of Montenegro

== UNESCO World Heritage Sites ==
The country has two distinct World Heritage Sites and additional two shared with other countries.

== See also ==
- Visa policy of Montenegro
- Aquarium Boka
