= List of clock towers =

This is a list of clock towers by location, including only clock towers based on the following definition:

A clock tower is a tower specifically built with one or more (often four) clock faces. Clock towers can be either freestanding or part of a church or municipal building such as a town hall.

The mechanism inside the tower is known as a turret clock which often marks the hour (and sometimes segments of an hour) by sounding large bells or chimes, sometimes playing simple musical phrases or tunes.

== Africa ==
=== Egypt ===
Name	City/Town	Built	Image
Cairo University Clock	Cairo		

=== Kenya ===
Name	City/Town	Built	Image
Parliament Buildings	Nairobi	1954	

=== Libya ===
Name	City/Town	Built	Image
Ottoman Clock Tower	Tripoli	1870	
Benghazi Municipal Hall Clock	Benghazi	1924	
Benghazi Lighthouse	Benghazi	1922	

=== Nigeria ===
Name	City/Town	Built	Image
University of Ibadan Clock Tower	Ibadan		
Kano Native Authority Clock Tower	Kano	1934	

=== South Africa ===
Name	City/Town	Built	Image
Clock Tower	Victoria & Alfred Waterfront, Cape Town		

=== Tanzania ===
Name	Location	Built	Image
Arusha Clock Tower	Arusha	1957	

=== Tunisia ===
Name	Location	Built	Image
Clock Tower	Tunis	2001	

== Americas ==
=== Argentina ===
- Torre Ader, Buenos Aires
- Torre Monumental, Buenos Aires

=== Aruba ===
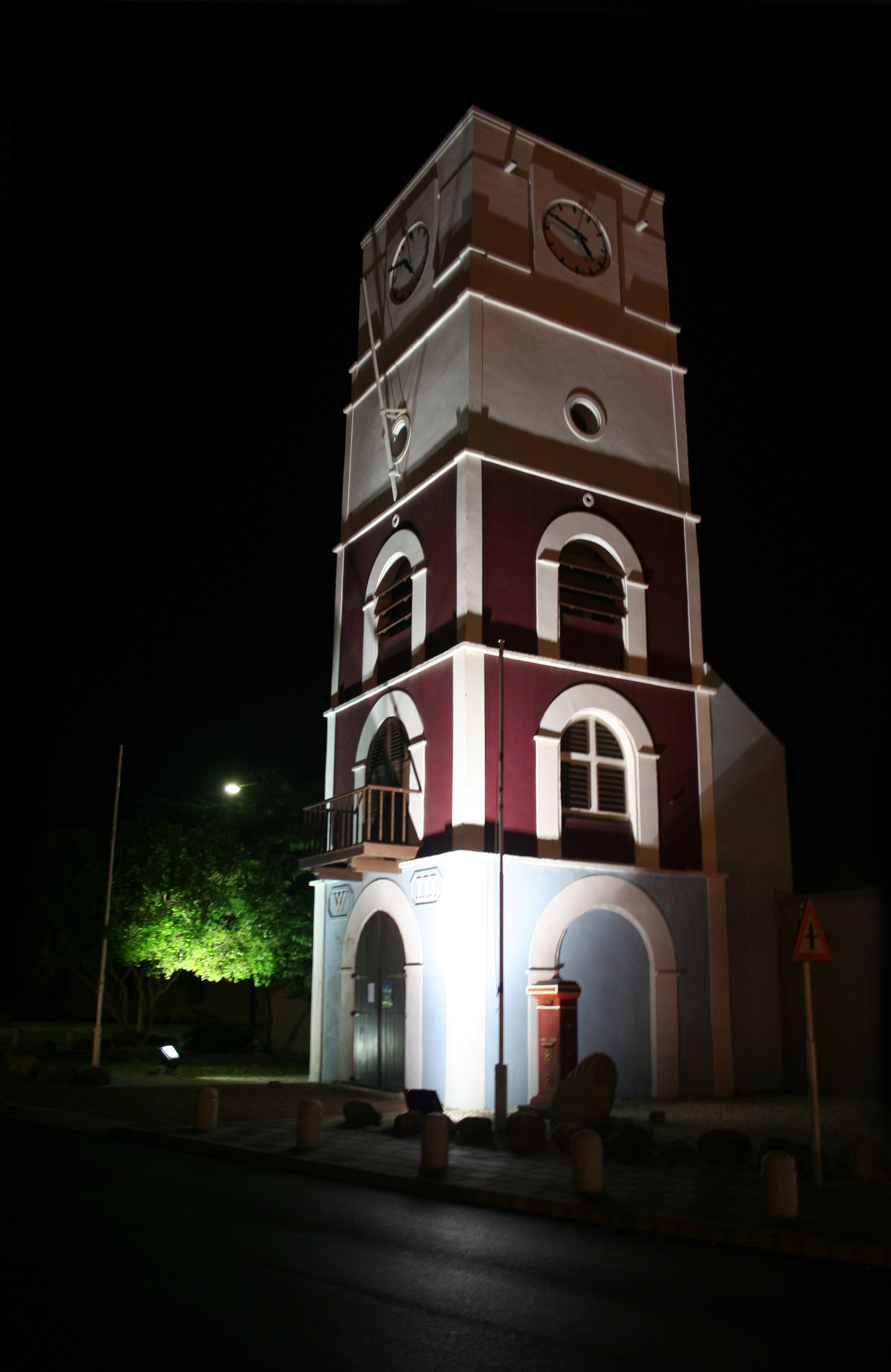
Willem III Tower at Fort Zoutman, Oranjestad, Aruba.

- Willem III Tower at Fort Zoutman, Oranjestad

=== Barbados ===
- Parliament of Barbados, Bridgetown

=== Brazil ===
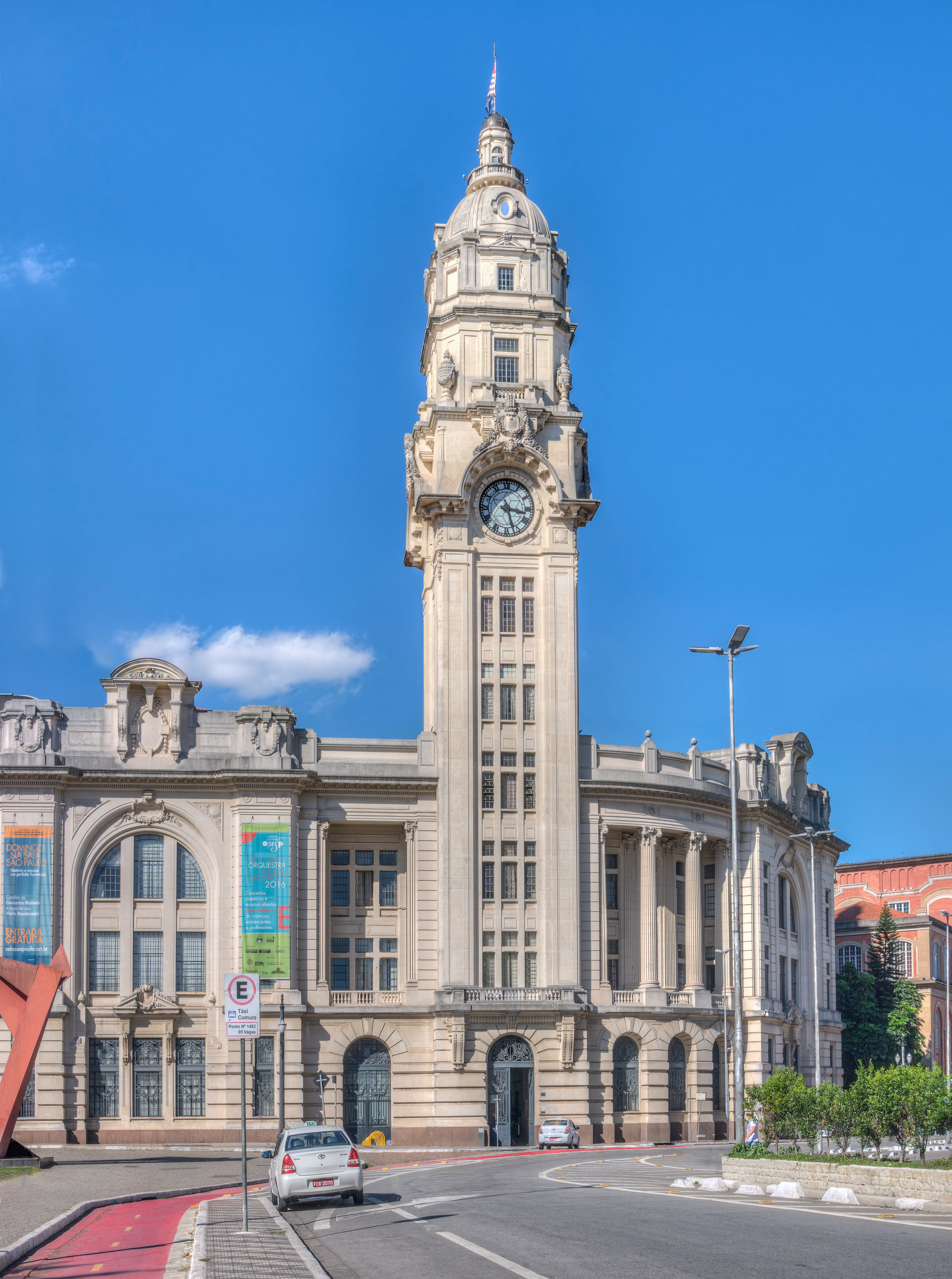
Júlio Prestes Station, São Paulo.

==== Alagoas ====
- Torre do Relógio, Piranhas

==== Amapá ====
- Marco Zero, Macapá

==== Amazonas ====
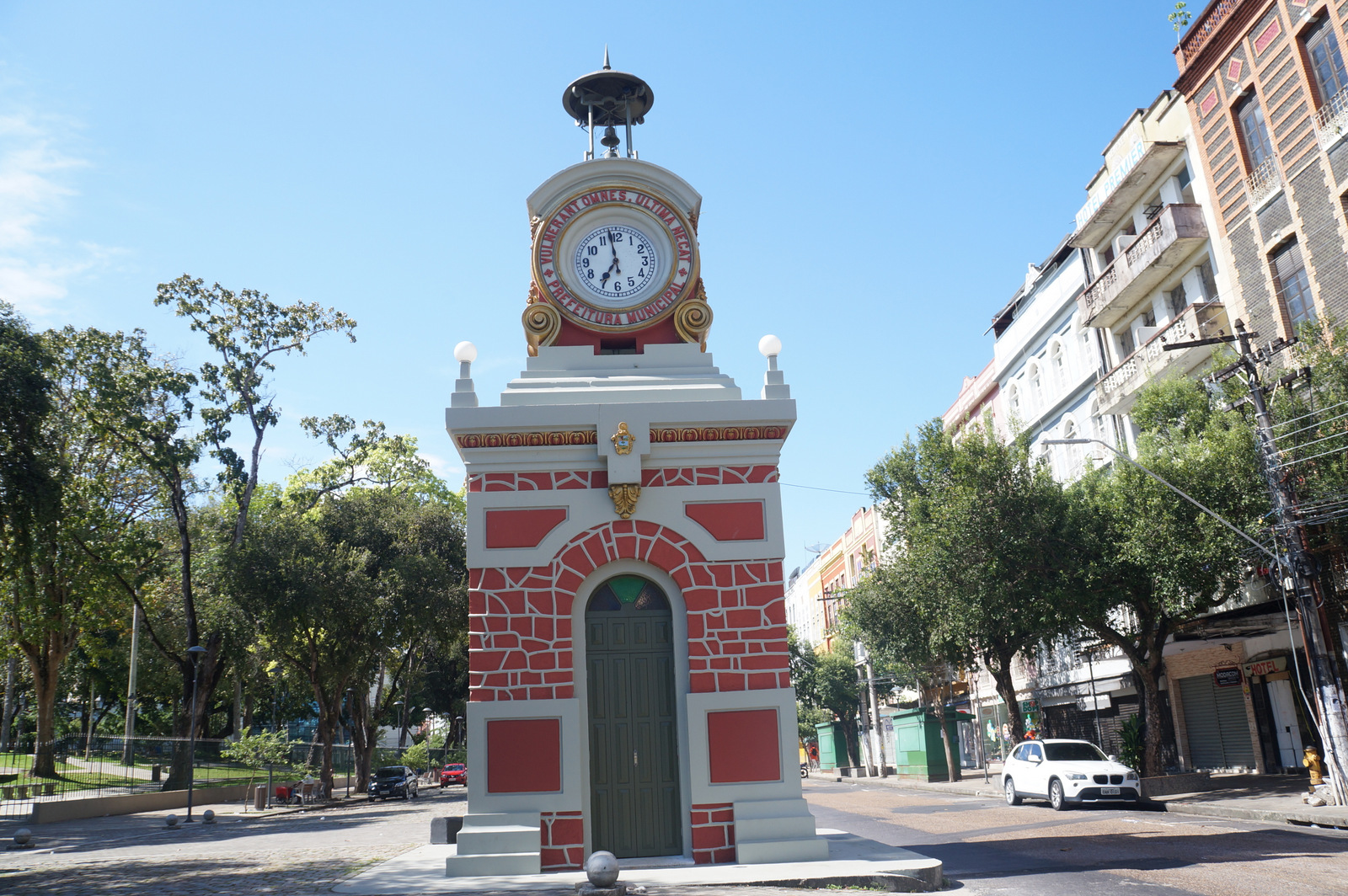
Relógio Municipal, Manaus.

- Praça Luiza Valério, Itacoatiara
- Relógio Municipal, Manaus

==== Ceará ====
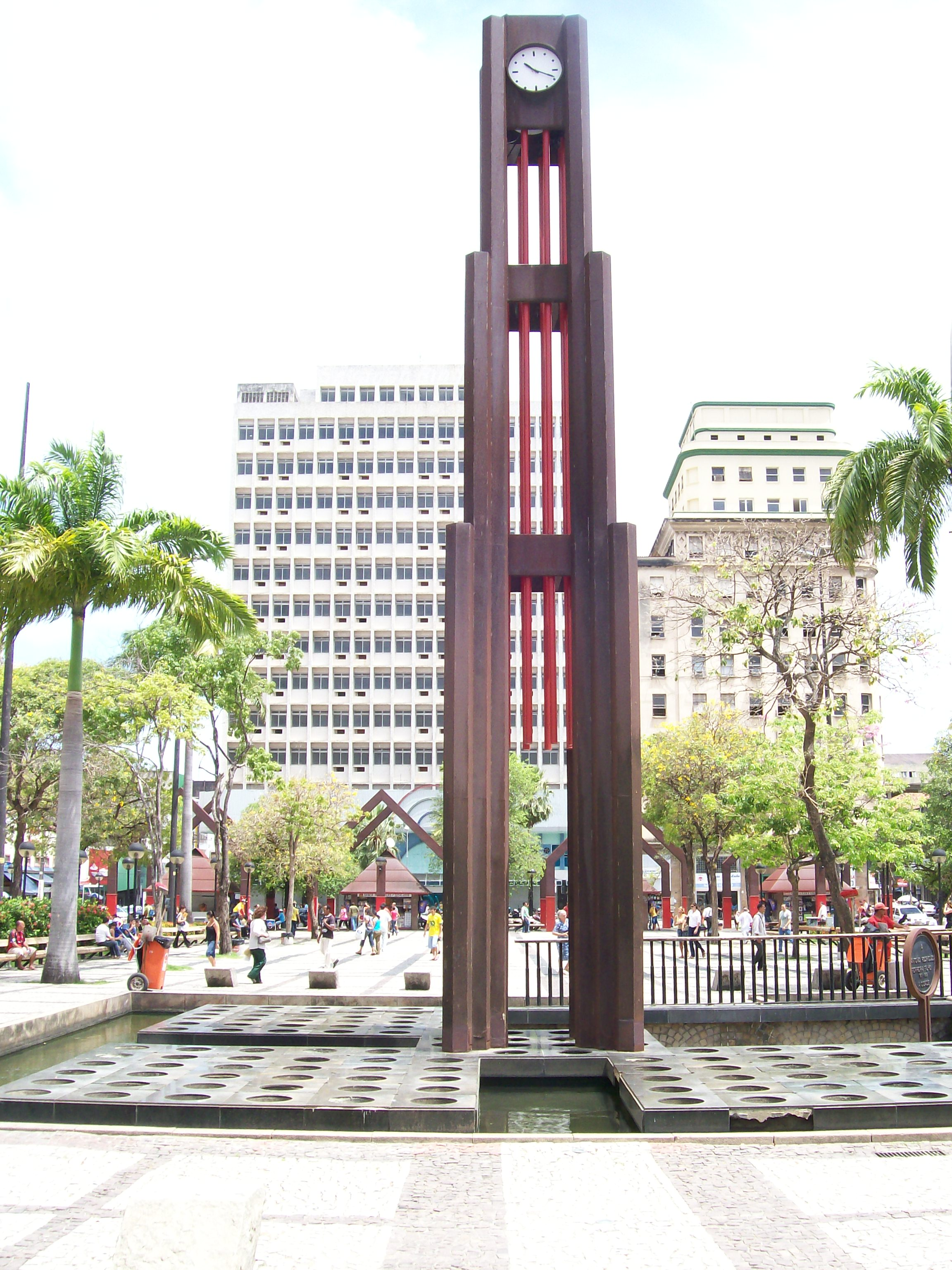
Atual Coluna da Hora at Praça do Ferreira, Fortaleza.

- Praça do Relógio, Tianguá
- Praça do Ferreira, Fortaleza
- Praça Coluna da Hora, Sobral

==== Distrito Federal ====
- Praça do Relógio, Taguatinga, Federal District

==== Espírito Santo ====
- Relógio da Praça Oito, Vitória

==== Goiás ====
- Relógio da Avenida Goiás, Goiânia
- Praça Guarda Mor Francisco José Pinheiro, Piracanjuba
- Antiga Estação Ferroviária, Goiânia

==== Mato Grosso ====
- Catedral Basílica do Senhor Bom Jesus, Cuiabá

==== Mato Grosso do Sul ====
- Relógio Central, Campo Grande
- Relógio Central, Três Lagoas

==== Minas Gerais ====
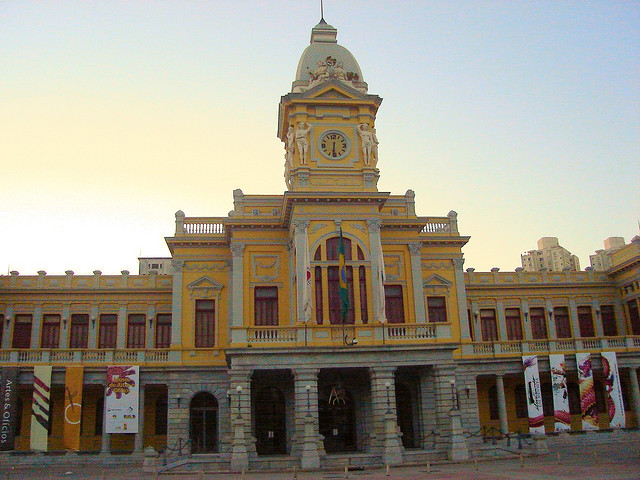
Estação Central at Praça Rui Barbosa, Belo Horizonte.

- Praça Rui Barbosa, Belo Horizonte
- Museu da Inconfidência, Ouro Preto
- Basílica Nossa Senhora de Lourdes, Belo Horizonte
- Catedral Nossa Senhora da Boa Viagem, Belo Horizonte
- Belo Horizonte City Hall, Belo Horizonte
- Centro de Cultura Belo Horizonte (CRModa), Belo Horizonte
- Praça Doutor João Penido, Juiz de Fora
- Praça Doutor Jorge Frange, Uberaba
- Torre do Relógio da Paróquia Nossa Senhora Saúde, Lambari
- Igreja Matriz de Nossa Senhora da Conceição, Pedro Leopoldo
- Igreja São José, Belo Horizonte
- Museu de Artes e Ofícios, Belo Horizonte

==== Pará ====
- Siqueira Campos Square, Belém

==== Paraíba ====
- Torre da Igreja do Convento São Francisco de Assis Campina Grande
- Torre da Igreja Nossa Senhora do Rosário Campina Grande
- Torre da Catedral Nossa Senhora da Conceição Campina Grande
- Torre da Igreja Evangélica Congregacional Campina Grande
- Torre da Igreja do Convento Ipuarana Lagoa Seca
- Torre da Igreja do Nossa Senhora de Santana Alagoa Nova
- Torre da Basílica Catedral Nossa Senhora das Neves João Pessoa
- Torre da Igreja Matriz Santa Rita de Cássia Santa Rita
- Torre da Igreja Matriz Nossa Senhora da Conceição Areia
- Torre da Igreja Matriz Nossa Senhora do Bom Conselho Esperança
- Torre da Igreja Matriz Nossa Senhora da Conceição Ingá
- Torre da Igreja Matriz Nossa Senhora das Dores Mogeiro
- Torre da Igreja Matriz Nossa Senhora da Conceição Itabaiana
- Torre da Igreja Matriz Nossa Senhora da Conceição Sapé
- Torre da Igreja Matriz Sagrado Coração de Jesus Mari
- Torre da Igreja Matriz Nossa Senhora do Livramento Bananeiras
- Torre da Igreja Matriz Nossa Senhora das Dores Monteiro
- Torre da Igreja Matriz Nossa Senhora da Conceição Serra Branca
- Torre da Igreja Matriz de São Sebastião São Sebastião do Umbuzeiro
- Torre da Igreja Matriz Nossa Senhora da Conceição Sumé
- Torre da Igreja Matriz de São Sebastião Picuí
- Torre da Igreja Matriz Nossa Senhora do Carmo Borborema
- Torre da Igreja Matriz Sagrado Coração de Jesus Serraria
- Torre da Catedral Nossa Senhora da Luz Guarabira
- Torre da Igreja Matriz Nossa Senhora do Rosário Pirpirituba
- Torre da Igreja Matriz Sagrado Coração de Jesus Pilões
- Torre da Igreja Matriz Santa Maria Madalena Teixeira
- Torre da Igreja Matriz Nossa Senhora do Bom Conselho Princesa Isabel
- Torre da Igreja Matriz Nossa Senhora da Conceição São Mamede
- Torre da Igreja Matriz Nossa Senhora da Piedade Cajazeiras
- Coluna da Hora Praça Getúlio Vargas Pombal
- Torre do Relógio Praça Cel. José Ferreira de Barros São João do Rio do Peixe

==== Paraná ====
- Paço da Liberdade, Curitiba
- Torre Nossa Senhora da Glória, Francisco Beltrão
- Praça General Osório, Curitiba
- Curitiba Cathedral, Curitiba

==== Pernambuco ====
- Faculdade de Direito do Recife, Recife

==== Rio Grande do Norte ====
- Torre da Igreja de Nossa Senhora da Apresentação Natal
- Torre da Igreja Matriz de São Sebastião Parelhas
- Torre da Igreja do Nossa Senhora de Sant'Ana Currais Novos
- Torre da Igreja do Nossa Senhora da Guia Acari
- Torre da Igreja Matriz Nossa Senhora da Conceição Jardim do Seridó
- Torre da Igreja Matriz São José Carnaúba dos Dantas
- Torre da Igreja Nossa Senhora do Rosário Caicó
- Torre da Igreja Matriz de São Sebastião Jucurutu
- Torre da Igreja Matriz de São Sebastião Florânia
- Torre da Igreja Matriz Santa Rita de Cássia Santa Cruz
- Torre da Igreja Matriz Nossa Senhora da Conceição Mossoró
- Torre da Igreja Matriz Nossa Senhora do Ó Serra Negra do Norte

==== Rio Grande do Sul ====
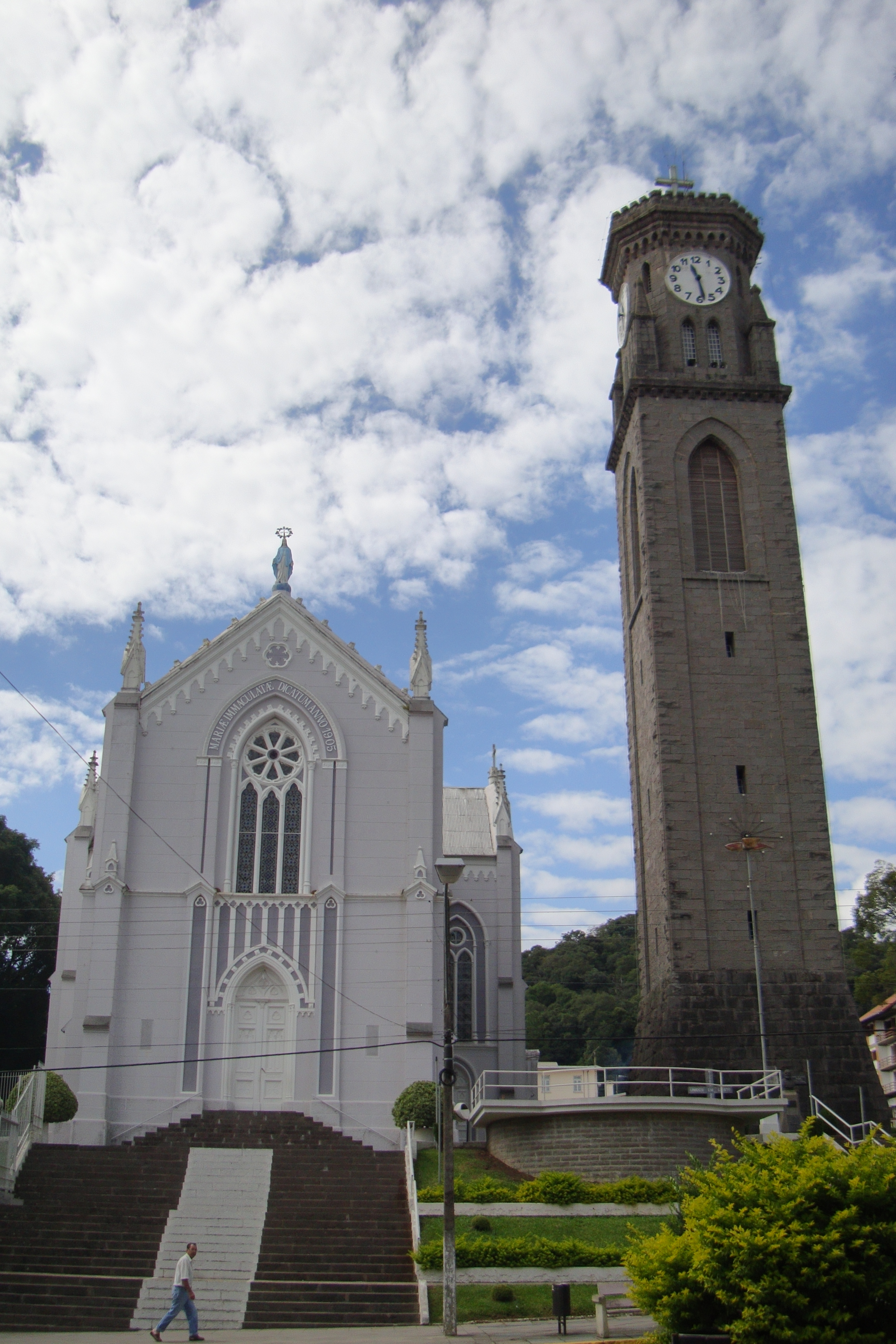
Campanário de Pedra, Flores da Cunha.

- Cathedral of Stone, Canela
- Memorial do Rio Grande do Sul, Porto Alegre
- Igreja Matriz São Pedro, Gramado
- Paço dos Açorianos, Porto Alegre
- Lutheran Parish of Gramado (Evangelical Church of the Lutheran Confession in Brazil), Gramado
- Igreja Evangélica Três Reis Magos, Novo Hamburgo
- Igreja de São Pelegrino, Caxias do Sul
- Campanário de Pedra, Flores da Cunha

==== Rio de Janeiro ====
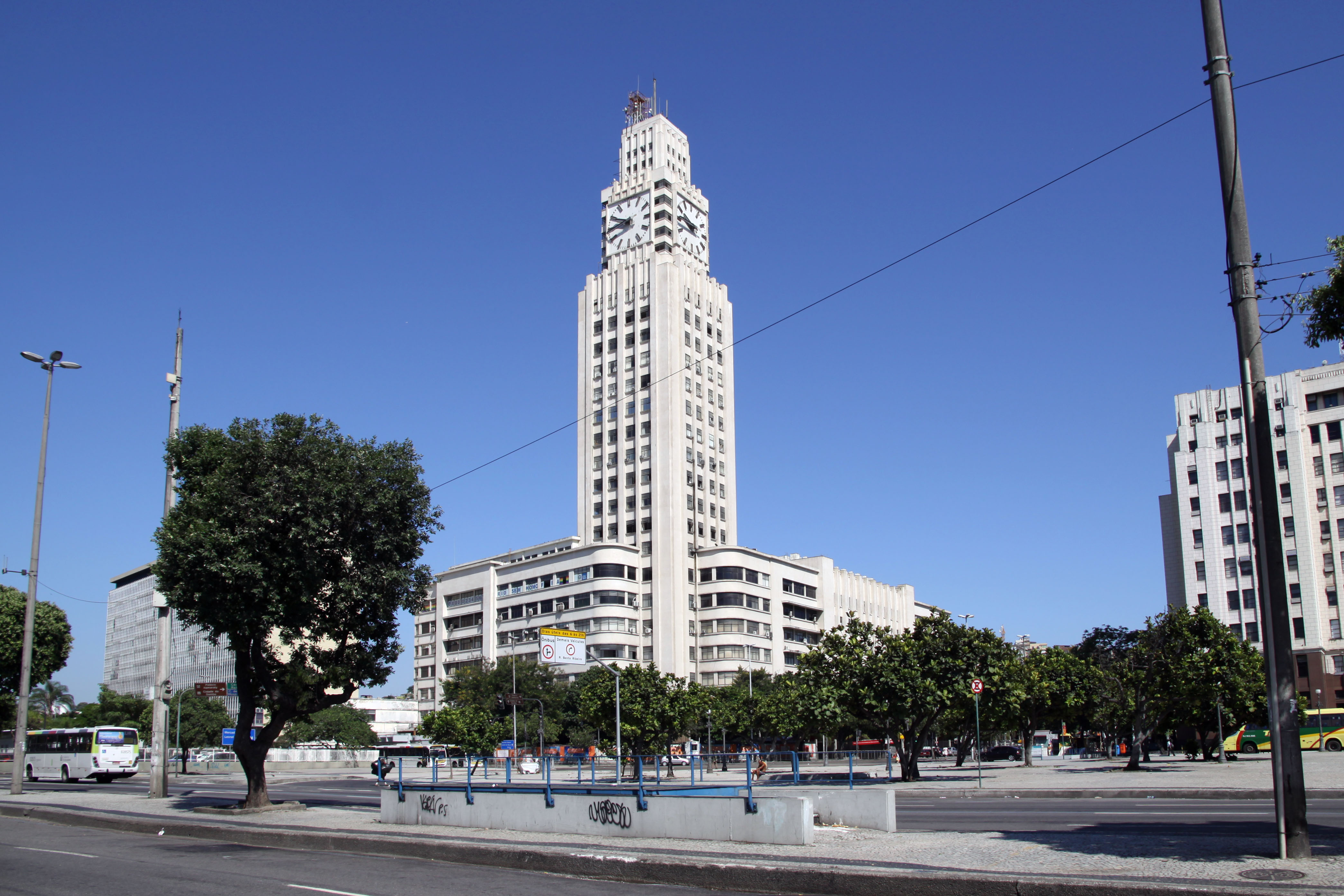
Central do Brasil, Rio de Janeiro.

- Central do Brasil, Rio de Janeiro
- Ilha Fiscal Castle, Rio de Janeiro
- Farol da Mesbla at Paquetá Island, Guanabara Bay
- Pier Mauá Tower, Rio de Janeiro
- Passeio 56 (former Mesbla, Rio de Janeiro

==== Santa Catarina ====
- Cathedral of St. Paul the Apostle, Blumenau
- Neumarkt Trade And Financial Center, Blumenau
- Il Campanario Villaggio Resort at Jurerê Internacional, Florianópolis
- Cathedral of St. Francis of Assisi, Caçador

==== São Paulo ====
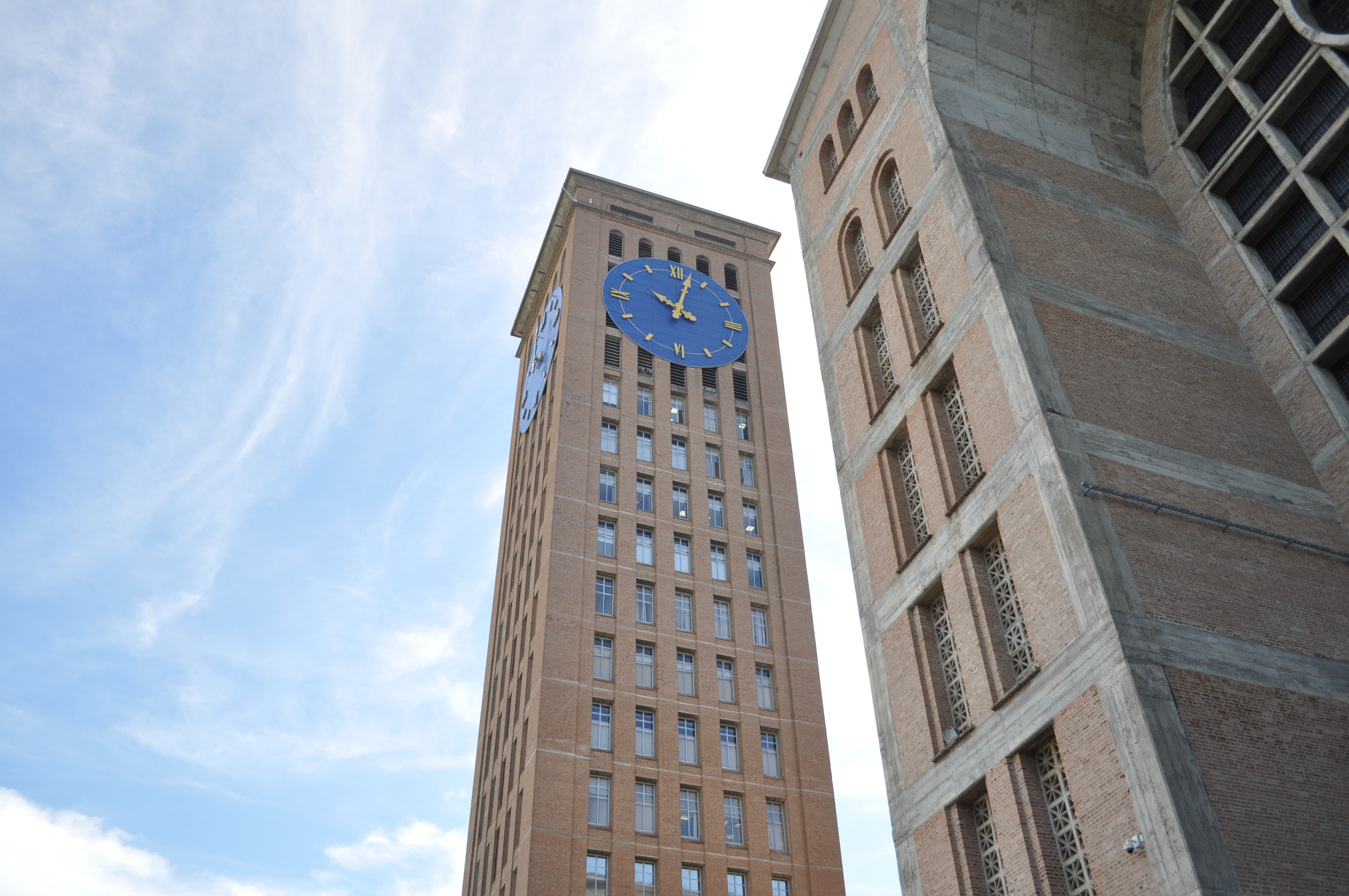
The Basilica of the National Shrine of Our Lady of Aparecida Clock Tower, Aparecida.

- Júlio Prestes Station, São Paulo
- Luz Station, São Paulo
- Clock Tower of The Basilica of the National Shrine of Our Lady of Aparecida Clock Tower, Aparecida
- Farol do Jaguaré, São Paulo
- Praça do Relógio at University of São Paulo, São Paulo
- Law School at University of São Paulo, São Paulo
- O Relógio da Sé at Praça da Sé, São Paulo
- CEAGESP, São Paulo
- Metropolitan Cathedral of St. Sebastian, Ribeirão Preto
- Clock Tower at Swiss Park, Campinas
- Catedral Nossa Senhora da Conceição, Franca
- Paranapiacaba, Santo André
- Relógio Félix Guisard - CTI, Taubaté
- Santuário de Santa Terezinha, Taubaté
- Palácio das Indústrias, São Paulo
- Post Office Palace, São Paulo
- Paróquia Santo Antonio, São Paulo

=== Chile ===
In 2013, a research made by newspaper La Tercera revealed that only 5 out of 25 clock towers are functioning in Santiago, mostly because of financial issues and lack of interest by the owners.

- Cámara de Comercio de Santiago, Santiago
- Intendencia de Santiago, Santiago
- Law School at University of Chile, Santiago
- Chilean National History Museum, Santiago
- San Francisco Church, Santiago

=== Canada ===
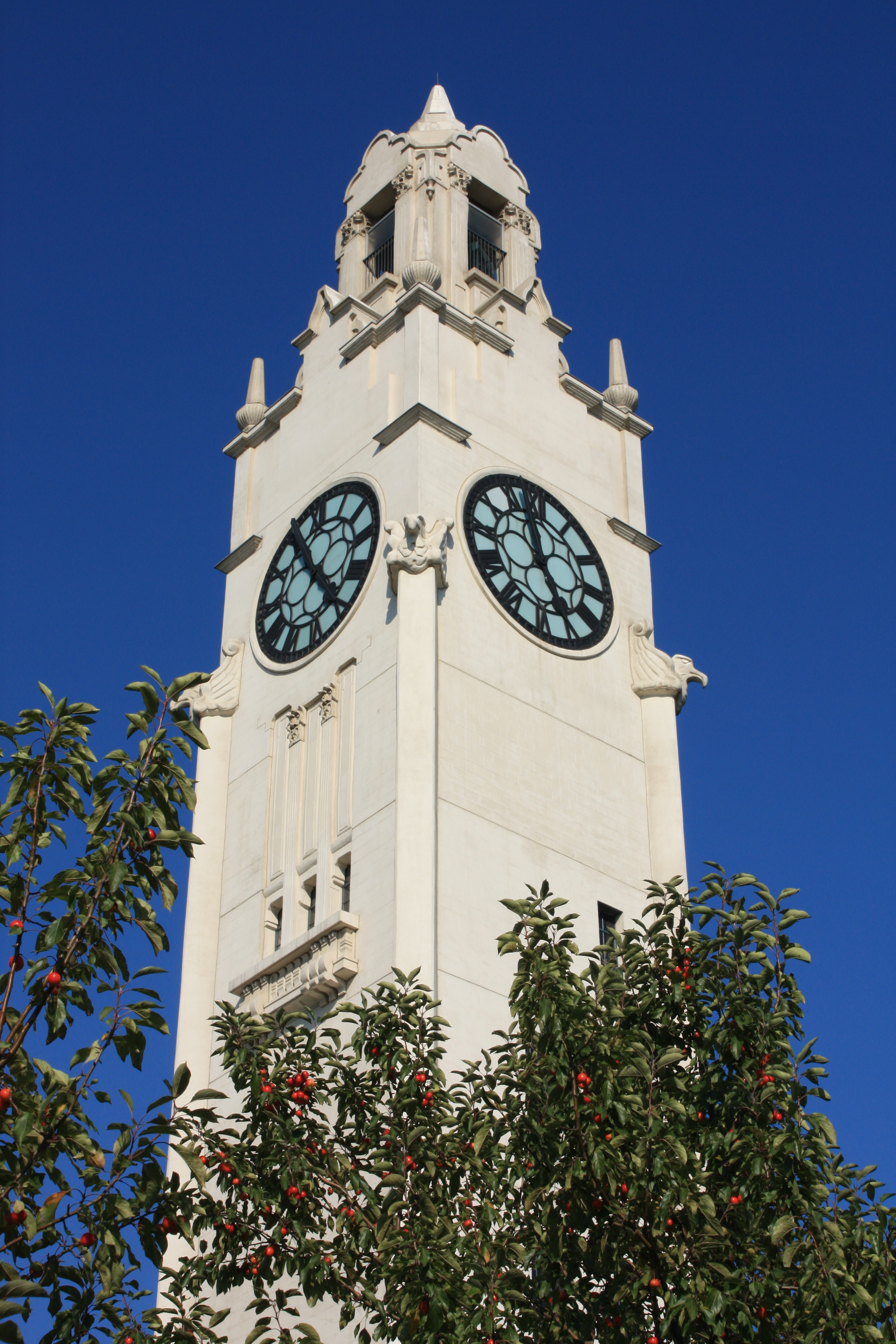
Montreal Clock Tower, Quebec.

==== Alberta ====
- Edmonton City Hall, Edmonton, Alberta
- Memorial Clock Tower (Cenotaph), Wainwright, Alberta

==== British Columbia ====
- Ladner Clock Tower (University of British Columbia), Vancouver, British Columbia
- Vancouver City Hall, Vancouver, British Columbia

==== Ontario ====
- Brampton City Hall, Brampton, Ontario
- Cambridge City Hall, (formerly Galt City Hall) Cambridge, Ontario
- Cathedral Church of St. James, Toronto
- Central Post Office (Ottawa)
- Dominion Building, Brampton
- Hamilton City Hall
- Hart House (University of Toronto), Soldiers' Tower (University of Toronto), Toronto
- Kerr Hall, Ryerson University, Toronto
- Mississauga Civic Centre in Mississauga
- Old City Hall (Toronto), Toronto
- Peace Tower, Parliament Hill Ottawa
- Planet Snoopy (formerly Hanna-Barbera Land), Canada's Wonderland, Vaughan
- Queen Street Viaduct, Toronto

(the 8th note milton ontario)

- Queen's Quay Terminal, Toronto
- Ridley College, St. Catharines
- Royal Military College of Canada, Kingston, Ontario
- St. Lawrence Hall, Toronto
- St. Paul's Cathedral (London, Ontario)
- Summerhill-North Toronto CPR Station, Toronto
- Toronto Fire Services Station 227, Toronto
- Upper Canada College, Toronto
- Market Hall Performing Arts Centre, Peterborough, Ontario
- Fire Hall and Police Station, Exhibition Place, Toronto
- Toronto Fire Service Station 315, former Toronto Fire Department Hose Station # 8, Toronto - 1972 replica of 1878 tower
- Press Building, Exhibition Place, Toronto
- former Toronto Fire Department Fire Hall Number 3, Toronto - tower now on top of new commercial building at 484 Yonge Street
- Toronto Fire Station 312, former Toronto FD Hall #10
- former North York Fire Hall # 1 hose drying tower - now located at Princess Park behind Empress Walk
- Etobicoke Civic Centre clock tower, Toronto
- East York Civic Centre, Toronto

==== Quebec ====
- Gare du Palais, Quebec City, Quebec
- Montreal Clock Tower, Quebec
- Place d'Armes Clock Tower, Montreal, Quebec

=== Mexico ===
- Reloj Monumental, Pachuca, Hidalgo

=== Peru ===
- Tower of the University of Saint Mark, Lima

== Asia ==
=== Azerbaijan ===
Name	Location	Built	Image
Old City (Baku) clock tower	Baku		
Baku ElectricalRailwaySstation Clock Tower	Baku	1846	
Baku City Executive Power Clock Tower	Baku	1904	
Clock Tower	Baku		
Baku Boulevard Clock Tower	Baku		
Clock Tower İsmailli	Ismayilli	2016	
Clock Tower Square	Nakhchivan	2019	

=== Bangladesh ===
Name	Location	Built	Image
Ali Amjad's Clock	Sylhet	ca. 1895	

=== China ===
Name	Location	Built	Image
Shanghai Clock Tower	Weitan, Shanghai Municipality	1927	
Haikou Clock Tower	Haikou, Hainan	1929	
Hong Kong Clock Tower	Tsim Sha Tsui, Kowloon, Hong Kong	1915	
Star Ferry Pier, Central	Central, Hong Kong	2006	

=== Bhutan ===
Name	Location	Built	Image
Clock Tower Square	Hogdzin Lam, Thimphu	N/A	

=== Indonesia ===
Name	Location	Built	Image
Jam Gadang	Bukittinggi	1926	

=== Iran ===
Name	Location	Built	Image
Vank Cathedral Clocktower	Isfahan	1931	
Imam Reza Shrine Clocktower	Mashhad	1891	
میدان ساعت (ساری)	Sari	1979	
Sa'at Tower (Tabriz City Hall)	Tabriz	1934	
Shams ol-Emare Clocktower	Tehran	1837	Shams-ol-Emare
Markar Clock Tower	Yazd	1942	
Jameh Mosque Clocktower	Yazd	1959	

=== Iraq ===
Name	Location	Built	Image	Notes
Qushla Clock Tower	Baghdad	1871		King George V gifted a large clock mechanism in 1927.
Kazimiyya Mosque Clock Tower	Baghdad	1883		Donated by Nasir al-Din Shah.
Abdul Qadir al-Gailani Mosque Clock Tower	Baghdad	1899		Erected during Ottoman period.
Abu Hanifa Mosque Clock Tower	Baghdad	1961		First clock donated by Abdul Qadir al-Gailani Mosque in 1919. The tower was built in 1961.
Baghdad Clock	Baghdad	1994		
Soren Clock	Basra	1906		Tower and building constructed in 1906 by Russian trader representing a German mechanical company, demolished in 1965 by Governor of Basra.
Moosawi Mosque Clock	Basra			
Basra University Clock	Basra			
Clock Church	Mosul	1882		
Erbil Clock	Erbil	2011		Built in 2011, stopped working for several months in 2015-2016.
Imam Ali Shrine Clock	Najaf	1888		Portal rebuilt in 1863 by Ottoman sultan Abdulaziz and Clock Tower gifted by Qajar Sultan Nasir al-Din in 1888, clock mechanism made in Manchester.
Kufa Mosque Clock	Najaf	1968		Clock added to minaret in 1968, donation from al-Haj al-Sayyid Tawfiq Allawi for renovation of Muslim ibn Aqil ibn Abi Talib shrine.
Imam Husayn Shrine Clock	Karbala	1894		Gifted by Nasir al-Deen Shah in 1312AH (1894).
Diwaniyah Clock	Diwaniyah	1965		
Al-Askari Shrine Clock	Samarra	1894-1896		Gifted by Nasir al-Din Shah Qajar alongside other Shia shrines in Iraq.

=== Israel ===
Name	Location	Built	Image	Notes
Khan al-Umdan	Acre	1906		
Haifa Clock Tower	Haifa	1898		
Safed Clock Tower	Safed	1900		Ottoman clock tower at the "Saraya" (government house)
Bell tower at St. Anthony's Church, Jaffa	Jaffa	1932		
Bell tower at St. Peter's Church, Jaffa	Jaffa	1894		
Jaffa Clock Tower	Jaffa	1903		
Jerusalem Clock Tower	Jerusalem	1907		Ottoman clock tower demolished in 1922 by British Mandate authorities.
Allenby Square Clock Tower	Jeruslaem	1925		Demolished in 1934.
Clock tower at the Monastery of Saint Saviour	Jerusalem	1885		
Petah Tikva clock tower	Founders' Square, Petah Tikva	2007		Rebuilt in the image of an older clock tower that once stood in the same location

=== Japan ===
Name	Location	Built	Image
NTT Docomo Yoyogi Building	Shibuya, Tokyo	2002	
Sapporo Clock Tower	Sapporo	1881	

Jordan

Name	Location	Built	Image
Irbid Clock Tower	Irbid		
University of Jordan Clock Tower	Amman		
Hashemite Plaza Clock	Amman		

=== Kuwait ===
Name	Location	Built	Image
Seif Palace clock tower	Kuwait City	1904	

=== Lebanon ===
Name	Location	Built	Image
Collège Saint Joseph – Antoura clock tower	Aintoura		
American University of Beirut's College Hall Clock	Beirut		
Abd Clock Tower	Nejme Square, Beirut	1930	
Hamidiyyeh Clock Tower	Beirut	1897	
al-Tell Clock Tower	Tripoli	1906	
Church of Saint Elijah	Qartaba		
Our Lady of Salvation Clock Tower	Zahlé		

=== Malaysia ===
Name	Location	Built	Image
Merdeka Memorial Clock Tower	Parit, Perak	1963	
Coronation Memorial Clock Tower	Kuala Kangsar, Perak	1939	
Sungai Petani Clock Tower	Sungai Petani, Kedah	1936	
Merdeka Memorial Clock Tower	Kulim, Kedah	1957	
Parit Buntar Clock Tower	Daerah Kerian, Perak	1961	
Jubilee Clock Tower	George Town, Penang	1902	
Malayan Railway Building	George Town, Penang	1909	
Birch Memorial Clock Tower	Ipoh, Perak	1909	
Clock tower	Kota Bharu, Kelantan		
Atkinson Clock Tower	Kota Kinabalu, Sabah	1905	
Malay College Kuala Kangsar Clock Tower	Kuala Kangsar, Perak	1955	
Sultan Abdul Samad Building	Kuala Lumpur	1897	
Tan Beng Swee Clock Tower, Stadhuys Square	Malacca	1886	
Teluk Intan Leaning Tower	Teluk Intan, Perak	1885	

=== Myanmar ===
Name	Location	Built	Image
High Court Building	Kyauktada Township, Yangon	1911	

=== Nepal ===
Name	Location	Built	Image	Notes
Ghanta Ghar	Birgunj			
Ghanta Ghar	Kathmandu			The tower was destroyed in an earthquake in 1990, and subsequently rebuilt, but does not look exactly like the previous version.
Dharan clock tower	Dharan			

=== Pakistan ===
Name	Location	Built	Image
Cunningham Clock Tower	Peshawar	1900	
Merewether Memorial Tower	Karachi	1892	
Silver Jubilee Clock	Karachi	1935	
Empress Market	Karachi	1889	
Clock tower	Faisalabad	1905	
Clock tower	Sialkot	1922	
Estcourt Clock Tower	Gujranwala	1906	
GCU Tower	Lahore	1864	
Clock tower	Multan	1884	
Navalrai Market Clock Tower	Hyderabad	1914	
6th Road Clock Tower	Rawalpindi	2015	
Lee Market Clock Tower	Karachi	1927	
Poonabhai Mamaiya Clock Tower	Karachi		
Victoria Clock Tower	Jacobabad	1888	

=== Palestine ===
Name	Location	Built	Image
Manara Clock Tower	Nablus	1906	

=== Philippines ===
Name	Location	Built	Image
Jaro Belfry	Iloilo City	1744	
Manila City Hall Clock Tower	Manila	1930s	
Quiapo Church	Quiapo, Manila	1988	
University of Santo Tomas Main Building	Sampaloc, Manila	1927	

Qatar

Name	Location	Built	Image
Amiri Clock Tower	Doha	1956	

=== Singapore ===
Name	Location	Built	Image
The Chinese High School Clock Tower Building		1925	
Victoria Theatre and Concert Hall		early 1900s	

=== Sri Lanka ===
Name	Location	Built	Image
Batticaloa Clock Tower	Batticaloa	1992	
Galle Clock Tower	Galle	1883	
Jaffna Clock Tower	Jaffna	1882	
Kandy Clock Tower	Kandy	1950	
Khan Clock Tower	Colombo	1923	
Koch Memorial Clock Tower	Colombo	1881	
Kurunegala Clock Tower	Kurunegala	1922	
Old Colombo Lighthouse	Colombo	1829	
Piliyandala Clock Tower	Piliyandala	1952	

=== Saudi Arabia ===
Name	Location	Built	Image
The Clock Towers	Mecca	2011	
Safat Clock Tower	Riyadh	1966	

=== South Korea ===
Name	Location	Built	Image
Myeongdong Cathedral	Myeongdong, Jung District, Seoul	1898	

=== Syria ===
Name	Location	Built	Image
Bab Al Faraj Clock Tower	Aleppo	1898	
Cathedral of the Holy Forty Martyrs Clock	Aleppo	1912	
Saint Elijah Maronite Cathedral Clock	Aleppo	1914	
Homs Old Clock	Homs	1923	
Hama Clock Tower	Hama	1950	
Our Lady of Dormition Cathedral Clock	Damascus		
Idlib Clock Tower	Idlib		

=== United Arab Emirates ===
Name	Location	Built	Image
Deira Clock Tower	Dubai	1963	
Sharjah Clock Tower	Sharjah		
Sharjah University Clock	Sharjah		
Kalba Clock Tower	Kalba		
Abu Dhabi Clock Tower	Airport Road, Abu Dhabi	1976	
Ajman Clock Towers	Ajman	2010	
Clock Roundabout	Dibba		

== Europe ==
=== Austria ===
- Graz Clock Tower, Graz

=== Denmark ===
- Dipylon Clock Tower in the Carlsberg District, Copenhagen
- City Hall Tower Clock on City Hall Square, Copenhagen

=== Finland ===
- Central railway station, Helsinki, Finland

=== France ===
- Metz railway station, Metz, France
- Colmar station, Colmar, France
- Église Notre-Dame-de-l'Annonciation de Lyon, Lyon, France

=== Germany ===
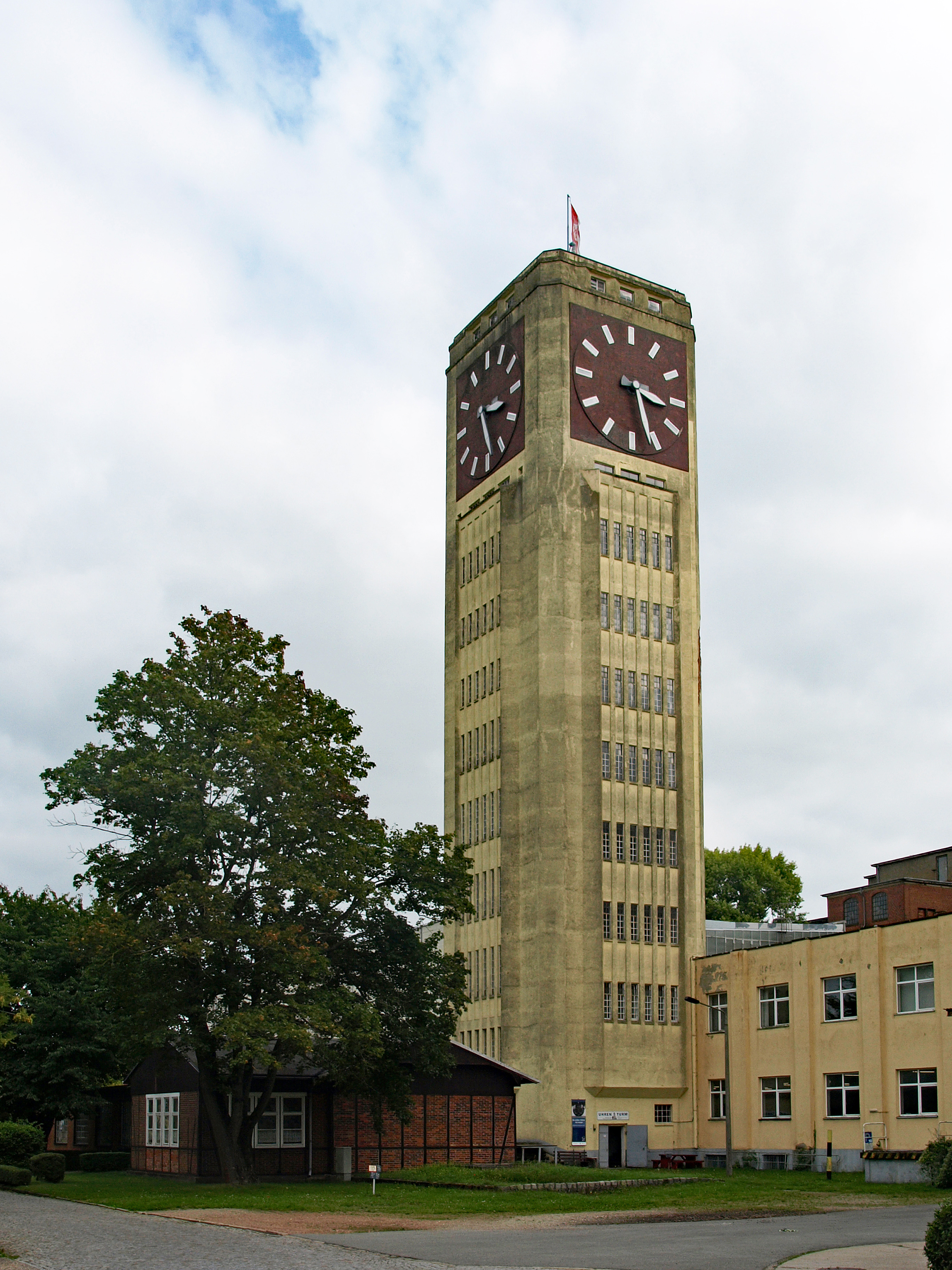
Uhrenturm Wittenberge

- Kroch High-rise (1928) in Leipzig, Germany
- Uhrenturm Singer Sewing Machine Company, Wittenberge (1928)
  - Aqeel Naqvi's Opera Memorial Clock, Berlin
- Schwäbisches Turmuhrenmuseum, a museum of tower clocks located in the Silvesterkirche clock tower, Mindelheim

=== Greece ===
- Clock Tower of Arta, Greece
- Clock Tower of Giannitsa, Greece
- Clock tower of Komotini, Greece
- Clock Tower of Saint Nicolas church, Kozani, Greece
- Clock tower of Xanthi, Greece

=== Ireland ===
- Church of St Anne (Shandon)#ClockIsle of ManChurch of St Anne Clock Tower in Shandon, Cork City
- Rathmines College of Further Education in Rathmines, Dublin City
- Tait's Clock in Limerick City, Ireland
- Clock Tower in Limerick City, Ireland
- Penny’s Clock in Limerick City, Ireland

=== Isle of Man ===
- Victoria Clock Tower, Foxdale, Isle of Man
- Jubilee Clock, Douglas, Isle of Man

=== Italy ===
- Pallata Tower, Brescia
- Civic Tower (Castel Goffredo)
- Clock Tower of Bassano in Teverina
- Messina astronomical clock, Sicily
- St Mark's Clocktower, Venice
- Torrazzo of Cremona
- Torre Bissara, Vicenza
- Torre delle Ore, Lucca
- Torre dell'Orologio, Brescia
- Torre dell'Orologio, Mantua
- Torre dell'Orologio, Padua

=== Latvia ===
- Laima Clock
- Riga Central Station

=== Lithuania ===
- Bell tower of Vilnius Cathedral on Cathedral Square, Vilnius

=== Malta ===
- Birgu Clock Tower, Birgu (destroyed)

=== Montenegro ===
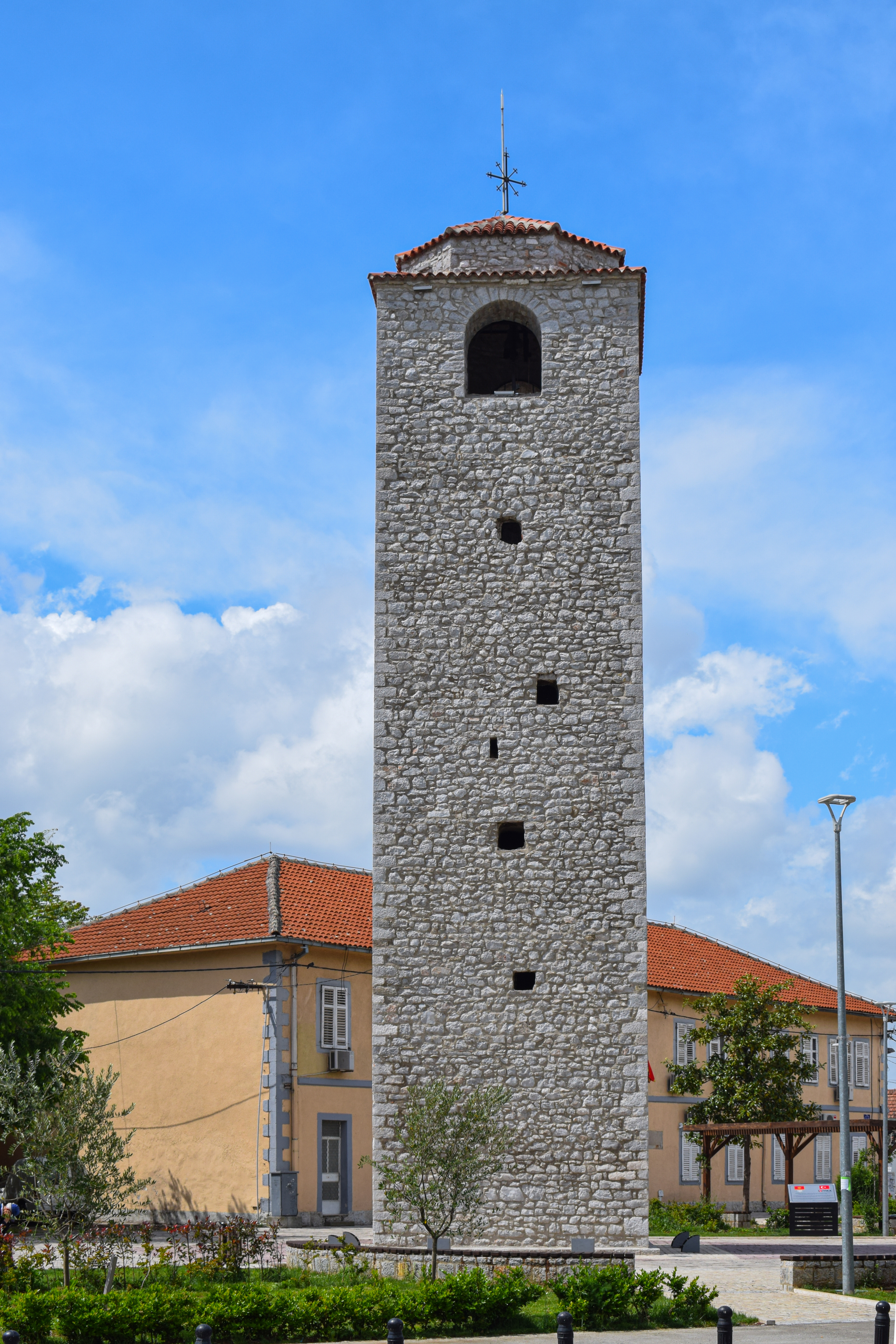
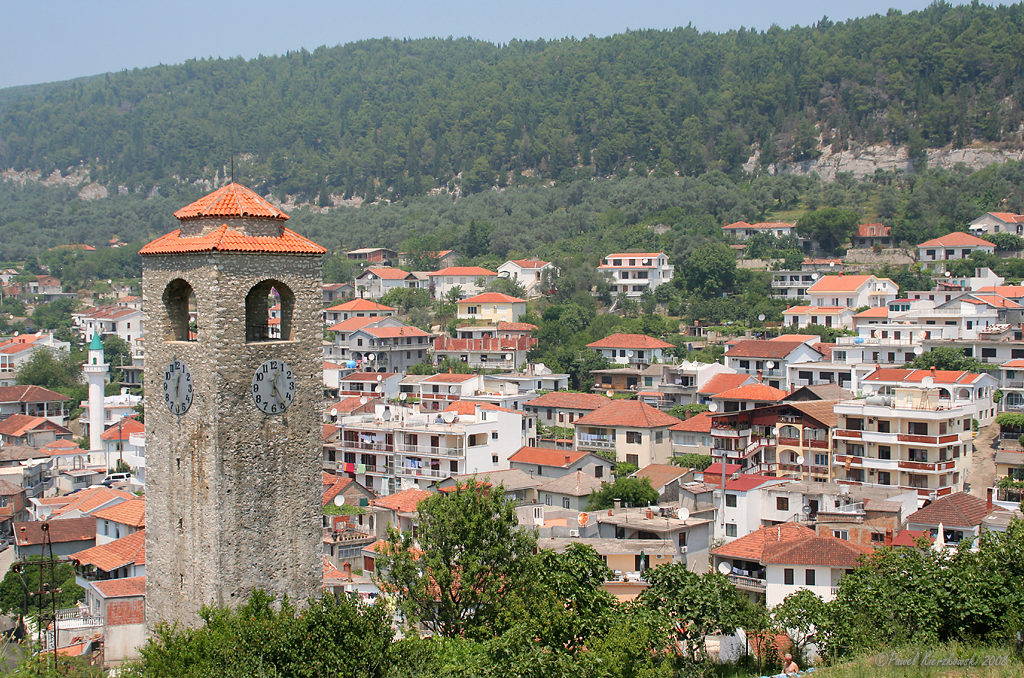
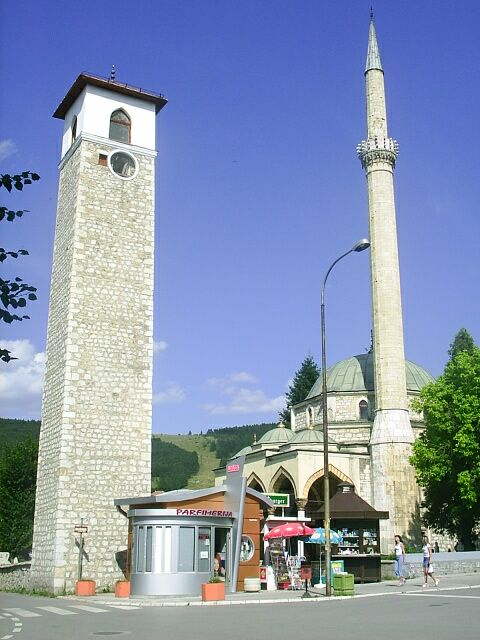
Clock Towers (Montenegrin: Sahat kula) in Montenegro: Podgorica, Ulcinj, and Pljevlja.
- Sahat kula, Podgorica
- Sahat kula, Ulcinj
- Sahat kula, Pljevlja

=== Netherlands ===
- Domtoren, part of the St. Martin's Cathedral church complex, Utrecht
- Martinitoren, Groningen
- Munttoren, Amsterdam
- Nieuwe Kerk, Delft
- Onze Lieve Vrouwentoren, Amersfoort

=== Romania ===
- Sibiu Evangelical Cathedral, Sibiu, Romania
- Sighişoara Clock Tower, Sighişoara

=== Russia ===
- Spasskaya Tower, Moscow

=== Serbia ===
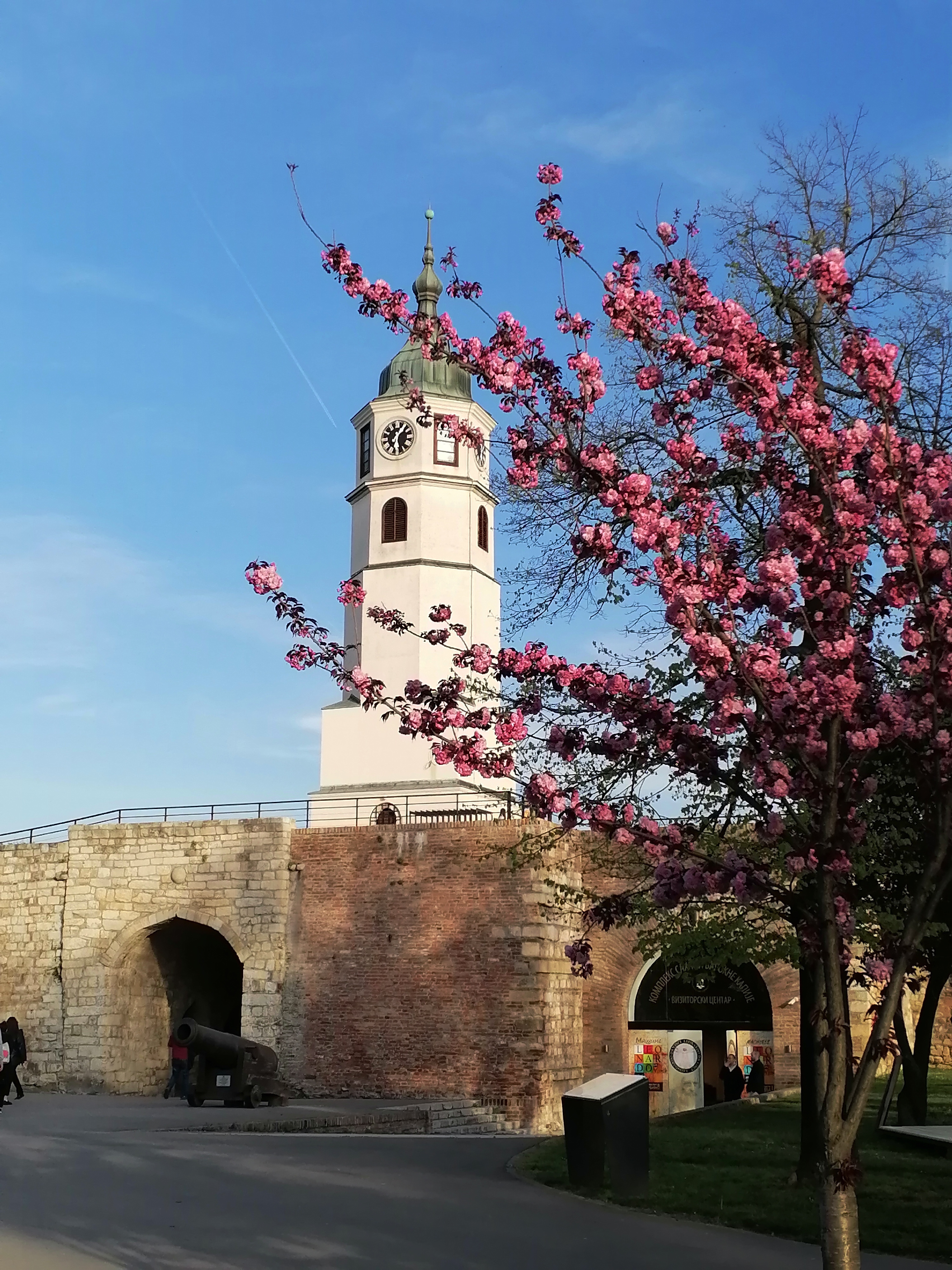
The Clock Gate or Sahat Kula (Сахат кула) (clock tower) at the fortress wall of the Belgrade Fortress, Belgrade, Serbia.

- Clock Gate, Kalemegdan, Belgrade

=== Slovakia ===
- Michael's Gate, Bratislava

=== Switzerland ===
- Einsiedeln Abbey
- Grimmenturm, Zürich
- Berntor, Murten
- Zytglogge, Bern

=== Turkey ===
- Nusretiye Clock Tower, Istanbul
- Yıldız Clock Tower, Istanbul
- Dolmabahçe Clock Tower, Istanbul
- Etfal Hospital Clock Tower, Istanbul
- İzmir Clock Tower, İzmir
- İzmit Clock Tower, İzmit
- Büyük Saat, Adana

=== Ukraine ===
- Simferopol railway station, Simferopol

=== United Kingdom ===
- Albert Memorial Clock, Belfast, Northern Ireland
- Bank Hall Clock Tower, Bretherton, Lancashire, England
- Brighton General Hospital, Brighton and Hove, England
- Central Hotel, Glasgow, Scotland
- City Hall, Cardiff, Wales
- City Hall, Norwich, England
- Civic Centre, Southampton, England
- Clock Tower, Brighton, England
- Clock Tower, Malvern, England
- Clock Tower, Knighton, Wales
- Clock Tower, Clevedon, England
- Clock Tower, Epsom, Surrey, England
- Clock Tower, Herne Bay, Kent, England – probably oldest in the UK
- Clock tower, Redcar, North Yorkshire, England
- Clock tower, Surbiton, London, England
- Nottingham Council House, England
- Colchester Clock Tower, Colchester, England
- Elizabeth Tower, Palace of Westminster, London, England (Big Ben is the name of the bell inside)
- Gravesend Clock Tower, Kent, England
- Haymarket Memorial Clock Tower, Leicester, England
- Joseph Chamberlain Memorial Clock Tower, University of Birmingham, England (The tallest freestanding clock tower in the world)
- Jubilee Clock Tower, Weymouth, Dorset, England
- Jubilee Clock Tower, Churchill, North Somerset, England
- King's Cross station, London, England
- Little Ben, London, England
- Liver Building, Liverpool, England
- Memorial Clock, Willenhall, England
- North British Hotel, Edinburgh, Scotland
- Parkinson Building, University of Leeds, England
- St Pancras railway station, London, England
- Tolbooth Steeple, Glasgow, Scotland
- Trent Building, University of Nottingham, England
- Victoria Building, University of Liverpool, England
- Victoria Tower, Liverpool, England

== Oceania ==
=== Australia ===
- Adelaide Town Hall, Adelaide, South Australia
- Adelaide General Post Office, Adelaide, South Australia
- Brisbane City Hall, Brisbane, Queensland
- Central Railway Station, Sydney, New South Wales
- Fremantle Town Hall, Fremantle, Western Australia
- General Post Office, Sydney, New South Wales
- Hobart General Post Office, Hobart, Tasmania
- Launceston Post Office, Launceston, Tasmania
- Kalgoorlie Post Office, Kalgoorlie, Western Australia
- Melbourne Town Hall, Melbourne, Victoria
- Perth Town Hall, Perth, Western Australia
- Sale Clocktower, Sale, Victoria
- Sydney Town Hall, Sydney, New South Wales
- Winthrop Hall, The University of Western Australia, Perth, Western Australia.
- The Nannup Clock Tower, Nannup, Western Australia

=== New Zealand ===
Name	Location	Built	Image
Ashburton Clock Tower	Ashburton	1976	
Auckland Town Hall	Auckland	1911	
Old Arts Building, University of Auckland	Auckland	1926	
Victoria Clock Tower	Christchurch	1897	
Dunedin railway station	Dunedin	1906	
Dunedin Town Hall	Dunedin	1878	
University of Otago Clocktower complex	Dunedin	1879	
Hastings Clock Tower	Hastings	1935	
Hokitika Clock Tower	Hokitika	1903	
Hopwood Clock Tower	Palmerston North	1957	
Westport Clock Tower Chambers	Westport	1941	

== See also ==
- List of tallest clock towers
