= Victoria Clock Tower (disambiguation) =

Victoria Clock Tower is a clock tower in Christchurch, New Zealand.

Victoria Clock Tower may also refer to:

- Victoria Clock Tower, Isle of Man
- Victoria Clock Tower, Jacobabad, Pakistan
- Victoria Clock Tower, Ripon, North Yorkshire, England
- Victoria clocktower Seychelles

== See also ==
- Victoria Tower (disambiguation)
