= NOSA-ITACA =

Software for masonry constructions

NOSA-ITACA is a free software package for the nonlinear structural analysis of historical masonry constructions. It is developed and maintained by the Mechanics of Materials and Structures Laboratory (MMS Lab) of the Institute of Information Science and Technologies "A. Faedo" of the National Research Council of Italy (ISTI-CNR).

== History ==
The original NOSA (NOnlinear Structural Analysis) finite element code was created at the National Research Council of Italy in the 1980s for solving problems in solid mechanics and structural engineering. Over the following decades, the code was extended to model masonry structures and integrated with the open-source SALOME platform for pre- and post-processing. This development led to the creation of NOSA-ITACA, which is currently distributed free of charge by ISTI-CNR for GNU/Linux systems.

== Features ==
NOSA-ITACA
- Developer: ISTI-CNR
- Written in: Fortran/Python
- Operating system: Linux
- Available in: English
- Type: Finite element method
- License: http://www.nosaitaca.it/download/MMSLab_Freeware_Licence_Agreement.pdf
- Website: http://www.nosaitaca.it/software/

NOSA-ITACA. is based on a constitutive equation in which masonry is modeled as a nonlinear elastic material with negligible tensile strength and either finite or infinite compressive strength.

The software supports:

- linear and nonlinear static analyses, including collapse analysis;
- thermomechanical analyses under thermal loads
- modal analysis
- modelling of structural strengthening and reinforcement interventions.

The finite element library includes beam, plane stress, plane strain, axisymmetric, brick and shell elements. The computational core is written in Fortran, while graphical interface and modelling environment are provided through integration with the SALOME platform.

Peer-reviewed studies support the recognition of NOSA-ITACA as a finite element tool capable of modeling the static and dynamic behavior of masonry structures, such as towers, beams, and domes. Comparisons with other finite element programs, including DIANA, MSC Marc, Ansys, Abaqus, 3MURI and SAP2000, are provided in peer-reviewed papers

== Applications ==
NOSA-ITACA has been applied in research and conservation projects involving historic towers, churches and monuments in Italy and abroad. Examples include:

- the Church of San Francesco, the San Frediano bell tower and the Clock Tower in Lucca,
- the Voltone and the Old Fortress in Livorno,
- the Mogadouro tower in Portugal.

== See also ==
- List of finite element software packages
