= Church of Shamoun Al-Safa =

Historic Chaldean Catholic church in Mosul, Iraq

- كنيسة شمعون الصفا
- Church of Shamoun Al-Safa
- 36°22′0″N 43°7′0″E
- Location: Mosul, Iraq
- Denomination: Chaldean Catholic Church

History
- Status: Ruined / Under restoration
- Founded: 9th–13th century

Specifications
- Length: 27 m
- Width: 7 m

The Church of Shamoun Al-Safa (كنيسة شمعون الصفا), also known as the Church of St. Peter or Mar Petros, is a historic Chaldean Catholic church located in the Old City of Mosul, Iraq. Dedicated to Saint Peter (known in Arabic as Shamoun Al-Safa, meaning "Simon the Rock"), it is widely considered the oldest church in Mosul.

The church was heavily damaged and partially destroyed by the Islamic State (ISIS) during their occupation of Mosul between 2014 and 2017. It is currently the subject of ongoing restoration and rubble-clearing efforts as part of broader initiatives to rebuild the Christian heritage of the Nineveh Plains.

== History ==
The exact foundation date of the Church of Shamoun Al-Safa is debated among historians, reflecting its ancient origins. Some sources date the current structure to the 13th century, while others trace its origins back to the 9th century or suggest that its foundations may be as old as 300 CE. The church is situated several meters below the current ground level of the surrounding streets, a common architectural feature of ancient Mesopotamian churches that indicates centuries of urban accumulation and the great age of the site.

Originally, the church belonged to the Church of the East. Following the schism of 1552 and the subsequent union of parts of the Church of the East with the Catholic Church, Shamoun Al-Safa came under the care of the Chaldean Catholic Church. For centuries, it served as a central place of worship for the Chaldean Christian community in Mosul and housed a historic cemetery.

== Architecture ==
The Church of Shamoun Al-Safa features a traditional Mesopotamian church layout. The building is 27 meters long and 7 meters wide in its central section. It is characterized by a double, asymmetric nave, reflecting the architectural styles typical of early Christian structures in the region. Like many ancient churches in Mosul, it was historically hidden behind thick, high walls to protect the congregation during periods of religious persecution under various Islamic caliphates.

== Associated institutions ==
Adjacent to the church was the Shamoun Al-Safa School, established in 1855. It holds the distinction of being the first Christian school established in Mosul. The school served the local community for over a century and a half before being almost completely destroyed by ISIS during their occupation of the city.

== Destruction and restoration ==
In 2014, the Islamic State (ISIS) seized control of Mosul and initiated a systematic campaign of destruction against non-Islamic religious sites, including churches, shrines, and monasteries. The Church of Shamoun Al-Safa and its adjacent cemetery were vandalized, looted, and heavily damaged during this period.

Following the liberation of Mosul in 2017, the site remained in ruins. In early 2022, the Chaldean Catholic Archeparchy of Mosul, in coordination with local authorities and international heritage organizations, began operations to remove rubble and assess the structural integrity of the church and the adjacent Maskantah cemetery.

The restoration of Shamoun Al-Safa and its associated school is part of broader international efforts to rebuild Mosul's religious heritage, most notably UNESCO's "Revive the Spirit of Mosul" initiative, which aims to restore historic churches, mosques, and synagogues in the Old City.

== See also ==
- Christianity in Iraq
- Chaldean Catholic Church
- List of churches and monasteries in Nineveh
- Destruction of cultural heritage by the Islamic State
- Our Lady of the Hour Church
