= Tiago Dantas Germano =

Brazilian writer & journalist (born 1982)

- Born: July 24, 1982 (age 44); Picuí, Brazil
- Occupations: Novelist and Journalist
- Writing career
- Language: Portuguese
- Notable works: Demônios Domésticos, O que pesa no Norte
- Notable awards: Prêmio Minuano de Literatura

Tiago Dantas Germano, known as Tiago Germano (born July 24, 1982), is a Brazilian writer and journalist who has been nominated twice for the Prêmio Jabuti, one of Brazil’s most prestigious literary awards.

== Biography ==
Born in Picuí, Paraíba, Germano is the author of novels, chronicles, and short stories. His writing often addresses social and familial themes with sensitivity and psychological depth. He is also a journalist and currently hosts the literary column Clube do Livro on Rádio CBN Paraíba, where he promotes books and discusses the importance of reading.

== Literary works ==
- Demônios Domésticos (2017): A debut collection of chronicles exploring family life and contemporary society.
- A Mulher Faminta (2018): A novel addressing love, identity, and emotional hunger.
- Catálogo de Pequenas Espécies (2021): A collection of short stories highlighting fleeting moments and human emotions.
- O que pesa no Norte (2022): A novel examining middle-class life in Brazil’s Northeast, with themes such as patriarchy, identity, and generational values.

== Recognition ==
Germano’s work has been acknowledged in both national and international literary scenes:

- Finalist for the Prêmio Jabuti in 2018 (Demônios Domésticos) and semifinalist in 2023 (O que pesa no Norte).
- Winner of the Prêmio Minuano de Literatura for Demônios Domésticos.
- Semifinalist for the Prêmio Oceanos in 2023 for O que pesa no Norte.

== See also ==
- Brazilian literature
- Prêmio Jabuti
- Prêmio Oceanos
