= São Mamede =

São Mamede can refer to:

- São Mamede (Batalha), a parish in Batalha, Portugal
- São Mamede (Lisbon), a parish in Lisbon, Portugal
- São Mamede (Paraíba), a town in Paraíba, Brazil
- São Mamede de Este, a Portuguese parish
- São Mamede de Infesta, a Portuguese city
- Battle of São Mamede
