= Praça Rui Barbosa =

Public square in Belo Horizonte

- Public square
- {{{other_names}}}
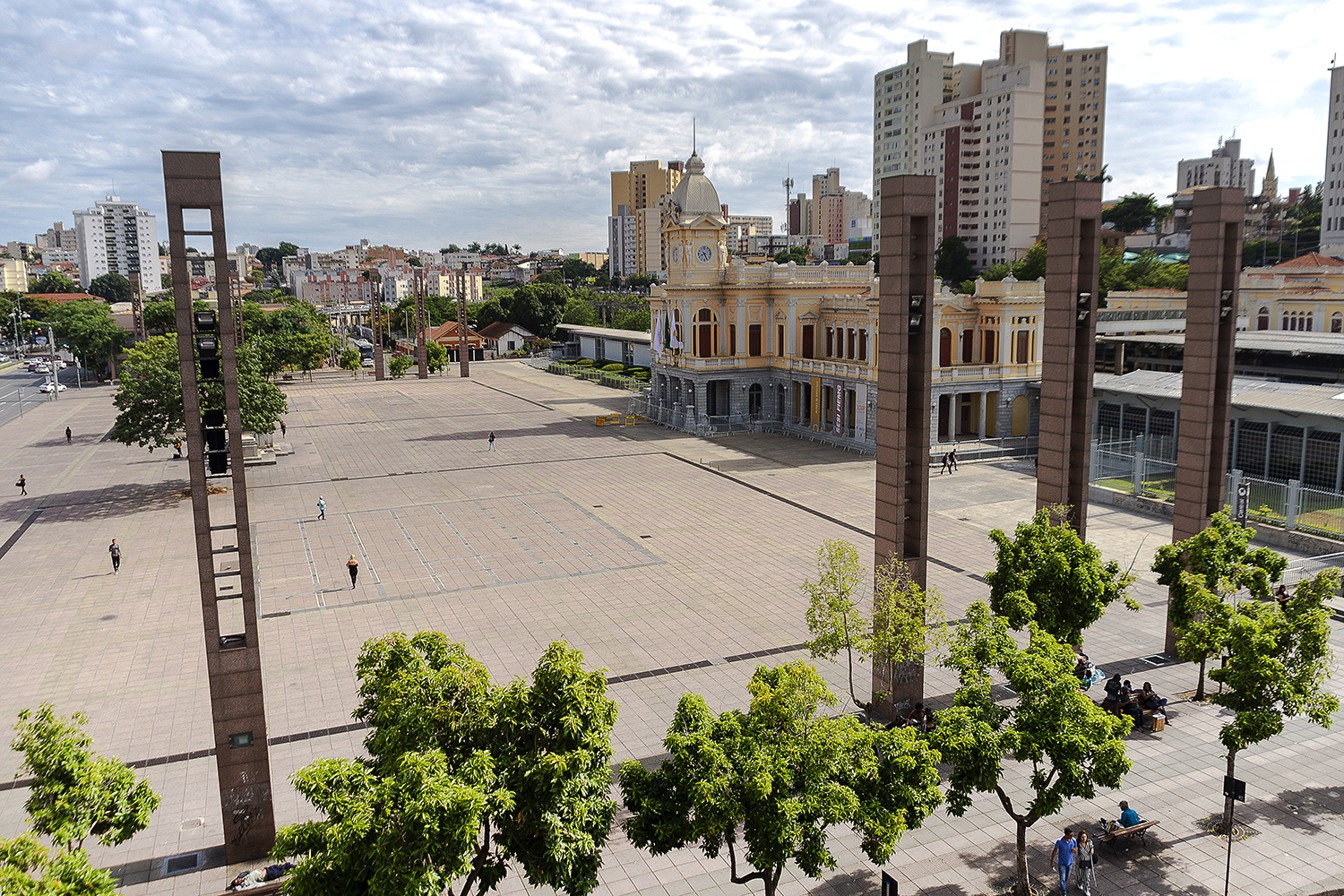
- Opened: 1904
- Surface: Stone
- Location: Belo Horizonte, Brazil
- Interactive map of Praça Rui Barbosa
- Coordinates: 19°55′00.45″S 43°56′02.28″W

The Praça Rui Barbosa (English: Rui Barbosa Square), also called Praça da Estação (Station Square), is a square in Belo Horizonte, Brazil.

It has this name due to its proximity to Belo Horizonte's Central Station. The square has the first public clock in the city.
