= Clock Tower, Gujranwala =

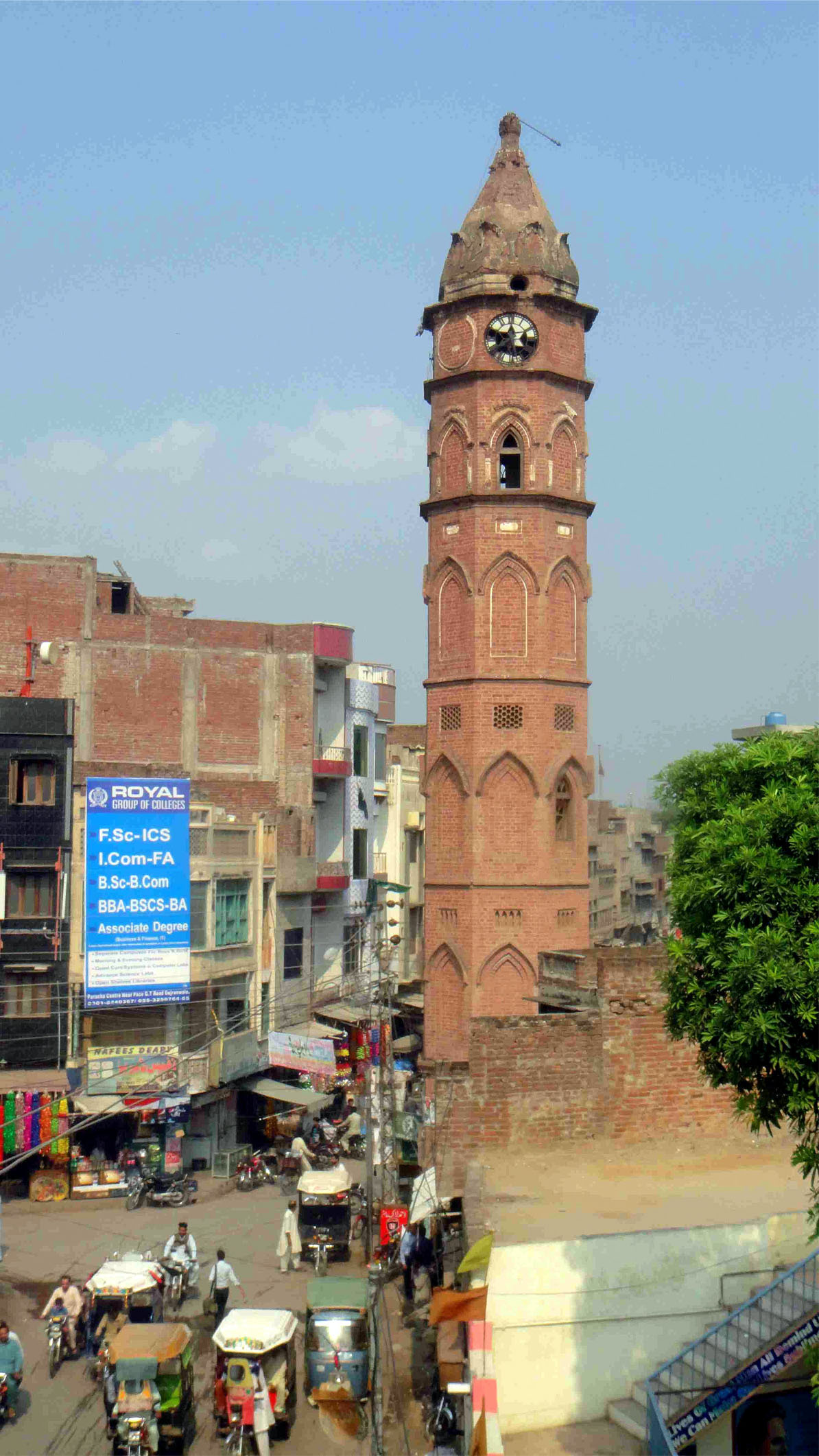
- Interactive map of the Clock Tower, Gujranwala area
- Alternative names: Ghanta Ghar

General information
- Type: Clock tower
- Location: Gujranwala, Punjab, Pakistan, Pakistan
- Coordinates: 32°09′31″N 74°10′49″E
- Construction started: 1901

Clock Tower, Gujranwala, also known as Estcourt Clock Tower, is a clock tower in Gujranwala, Punjab, Pakistan.

== History ==
Clock Tower was constructed in 1901. The then-Deputy Commissioner initiated its construction, equipping it with large clocks on all four sides for public time-telling. In 1906, a bell was added to the tower, ringing hourly and audible throughout the city.

Maintenance responsibilities for the tower were traditionally handled by appointed caretakers. This role continued within the same family, even after the original caretaker's death, prior to Pakistan's independence.

In 1950, the tower was electrified, but this service was discontinued in the 1980s due to unpaid bills. Although funds were allocated for its repair during Muhammad Aslam Butt's mayoral tenure, the work was not completed due to administrative issues. As a result, the tower shows signs of deterioration, specifically in its stairs, main door, and clocks.
