= São João do Rio do Peixe =

Coordinates: 6°44′S 38°27′W

- Municipality
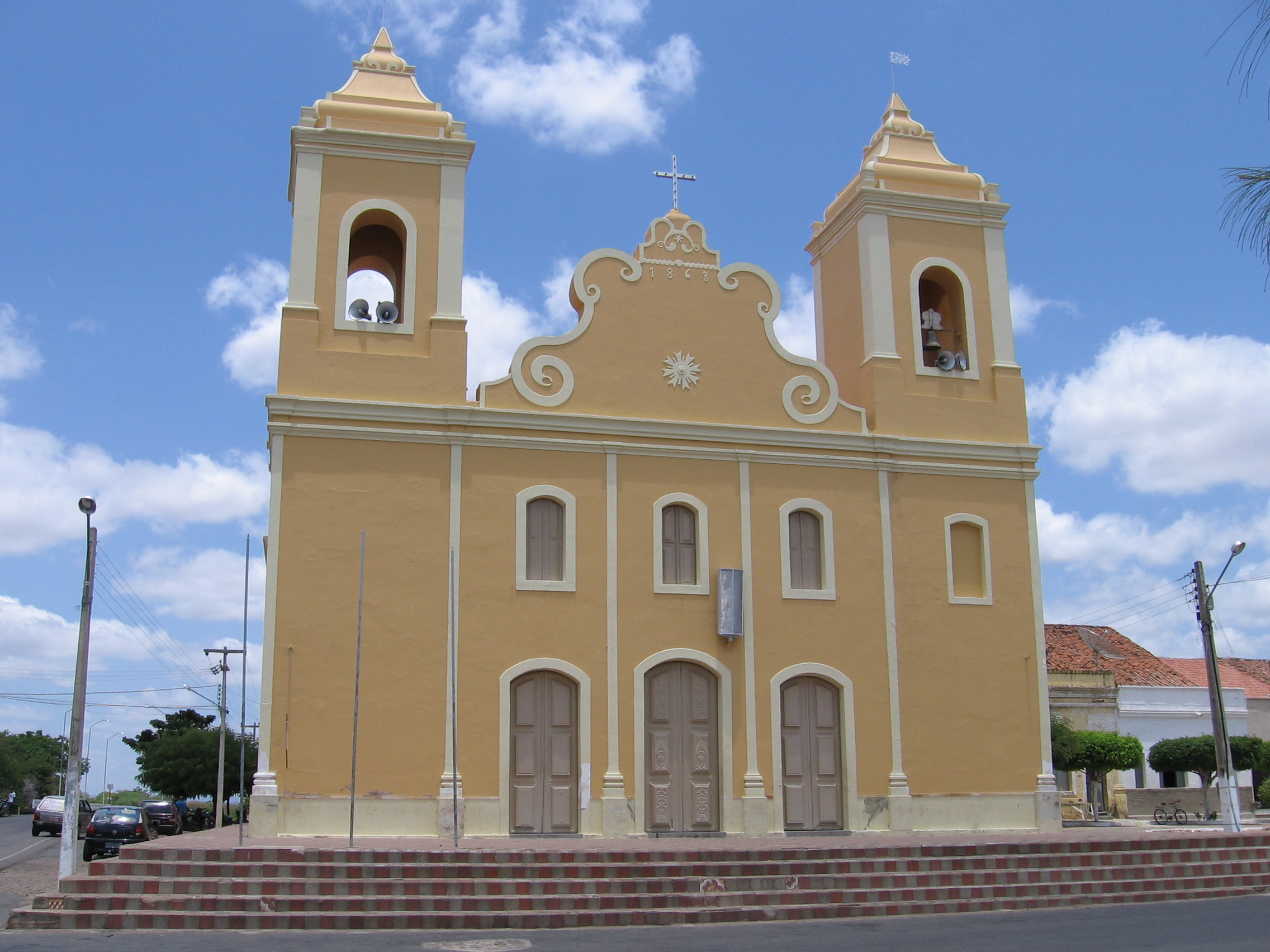

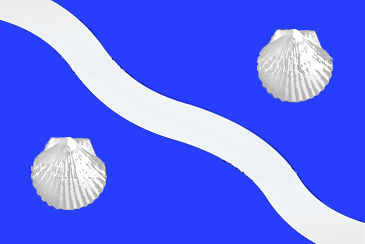
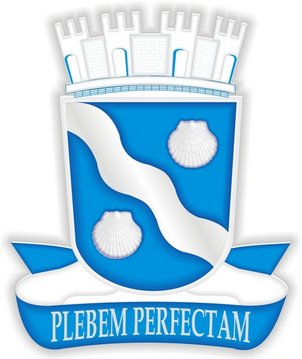
- Flag Coat of arms

- Country: Brazil
- Region: Northeast
- State: Paraíba
- Mesoregion: Sertao Paraibana

Population (2020)
  - Total: 18,026
- Time zone: UTC−3 (BRT)

São João do Rio do Peixe is a municipality in the state of Paraíba in the Northeast Region of Brazil.

== See also ==
- List of municipalities in Paraíba
