= Old Arts Building =

Category 1 Historic Place

The ClockTower
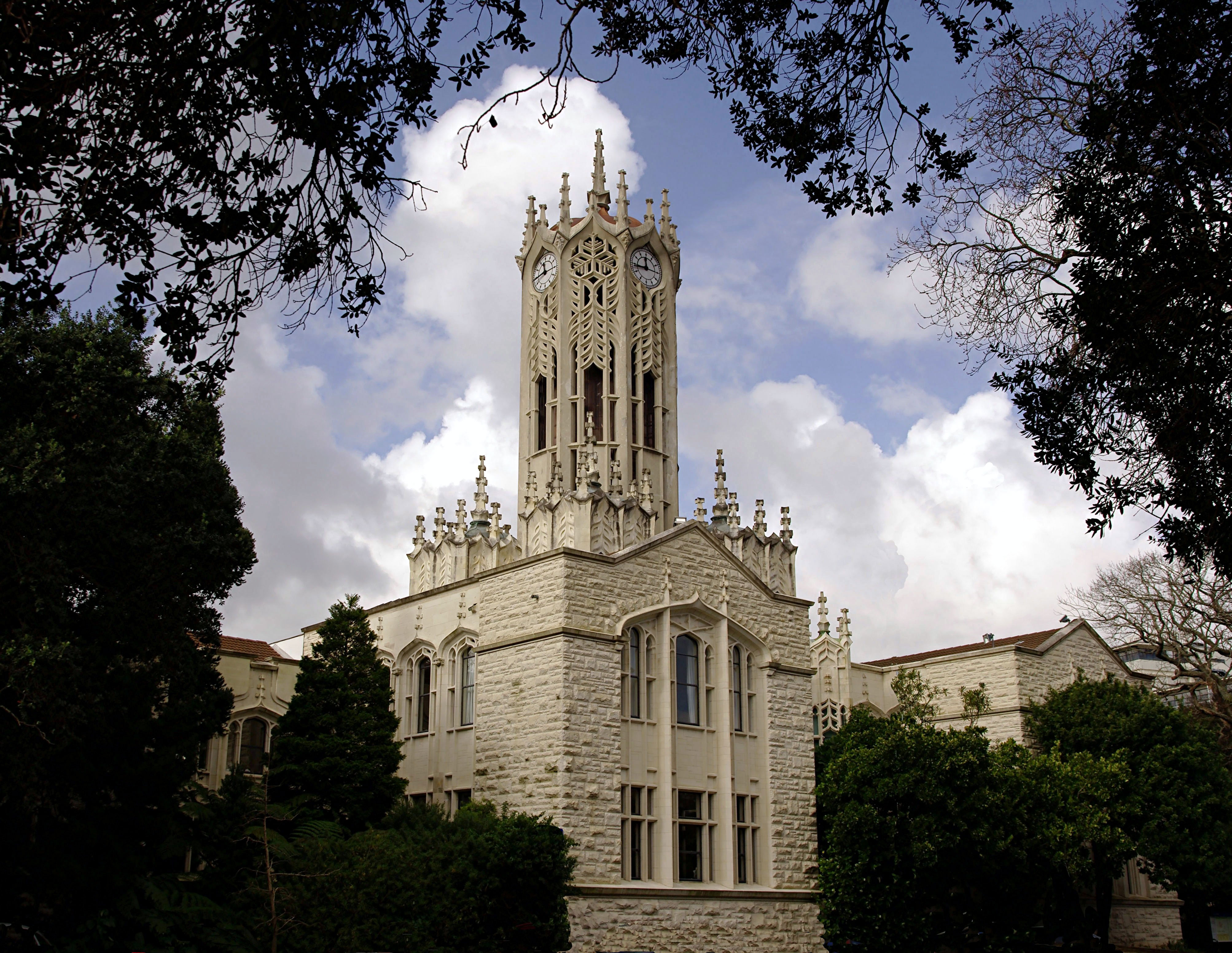
- Former names: Old Arts Building

General information
- Architectural style: Perpendicular Gothic
- Location: 22 Princes Street, Auckland
- Coordinates: 36°51′01″S 174°46′10″E
- Construction started: 1923
- Completed: 1926

Height
- Height: 54 meters

Design and construction
- Architect: Roy Alstan Lippincott
- Main contractor: Fletcher Construction Co

Heritage New Zealand – Category 1
- Designated: 8 August 1983
- Reference no.: 25

The Old Arts Building, also known as The ClockTower, is a historic Perpendicular Gothic clocktower in Auckland, New Zealand, completed in 1926 for the University of Auckland. It has housed several university departments and is a landmark for the university. It is registered as a category 1 building by Heritage New Zealand.

== History ==
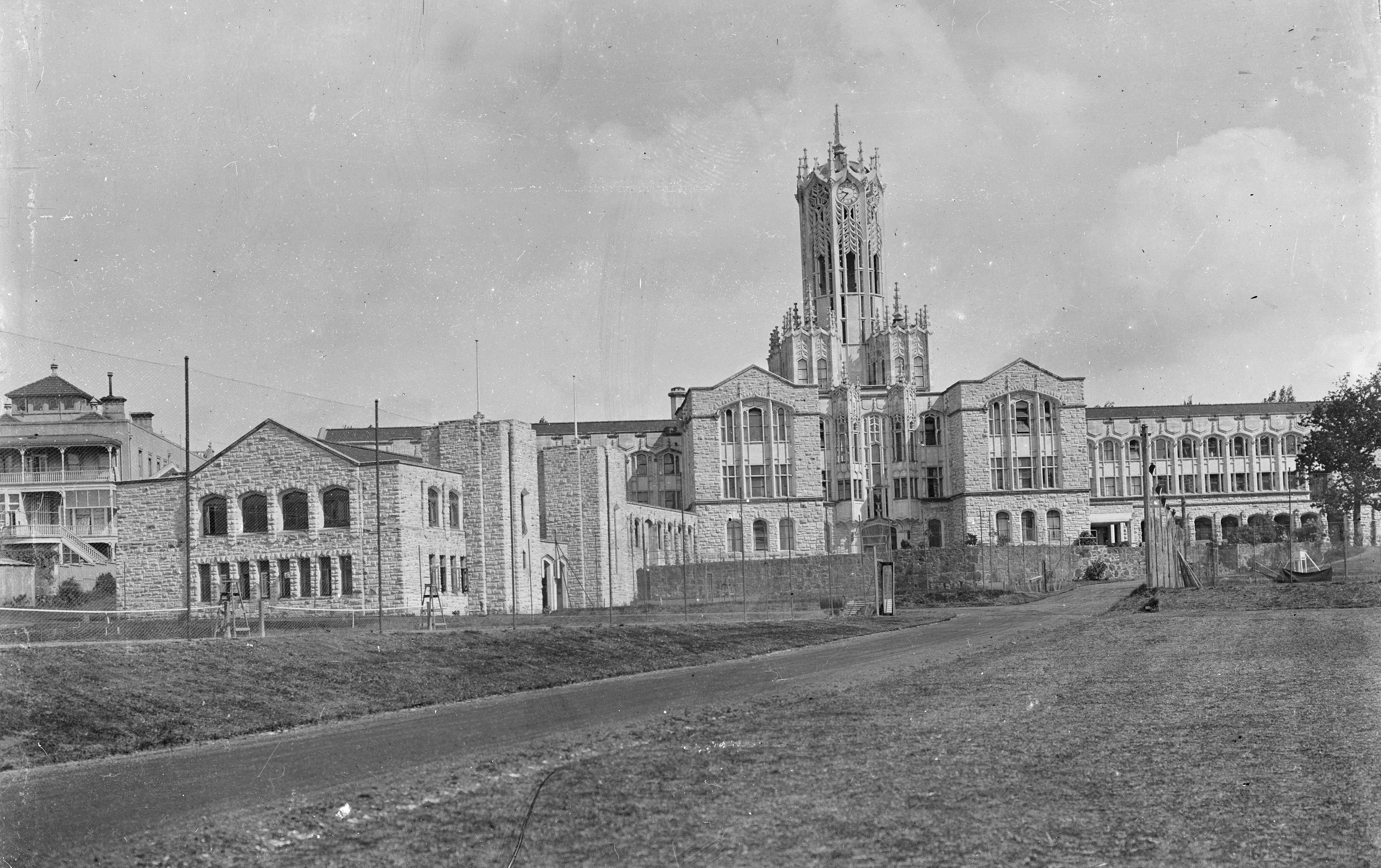
Albert Percy Godber (1928) The ClockTower, University of Auckland.

The ClockTower at the University of Auckland was designed by Roy Alstan Lippincott, a Chicago-trained architect and brother-in-law of Walter Burley Griffin. In 1921, Lippincott and draughtsman Edward F. Billson won the competition for the design of the then Auckland University College Arts Building out of 44 entries. It was then constructed between 1923 and 1926 by Fletcher Construction Co. The construction was largely funded by a central government grant with additional public subscriptions.

The building has housed departments of Arts, Architecture, Law, Music and the Library as well as the University Hall, and limited student amenities in the rear wing.

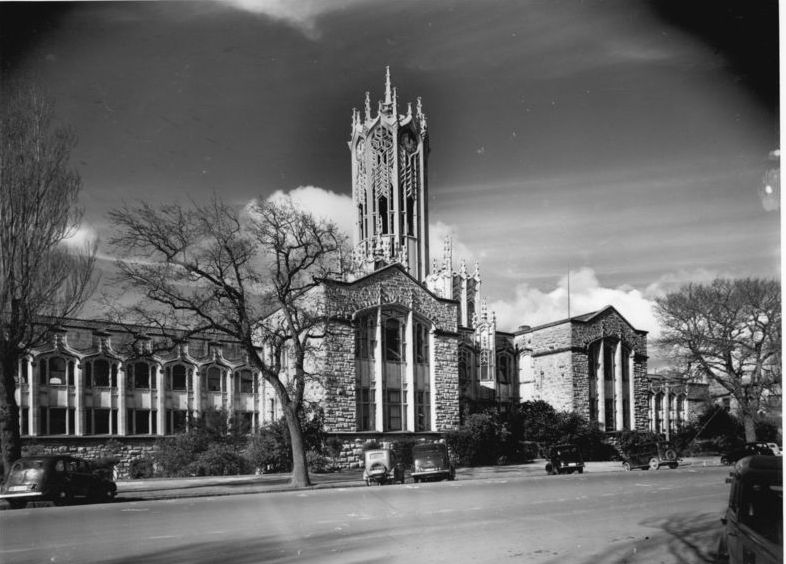
Undated Image of the ClockTower

== Architecture ==
The building consists of a main block with the famous clock tower that it is known by, and a connecting wing on the rear. They were carried out in "an elegant Arts and Crafts interpretation of Perpendicular Gothic" style. It was faced with stone from Mount Somers and Oamaru. The tower, which is 54 meters tall, was inspired by the Tom Tower of Christ Church, Oxford.

In the ornamentation of the building, there is representations of native flora and fauna including flax-seed pods, ponga fronds, kākā and kea. Lippincott also embraced the idea of "the University becoming 'a small botanical garden'" in landscaping the grounds around the building with multiple native plants, including manuka and kōwhai. The interior is octagonal, vaulted and there are mosaic floors and piers. The mosaic floor in the foyer underneath the tower is particularly notable.

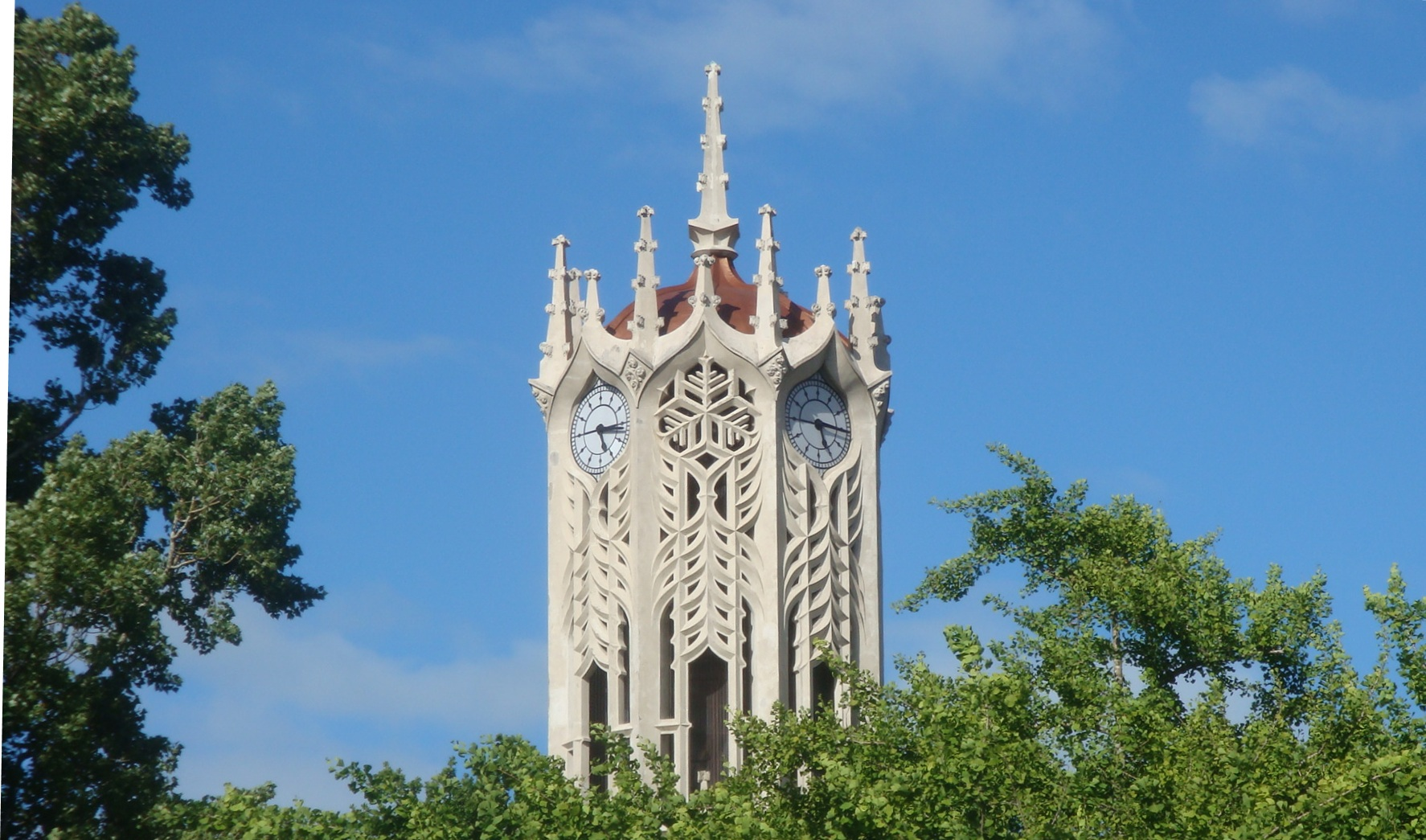

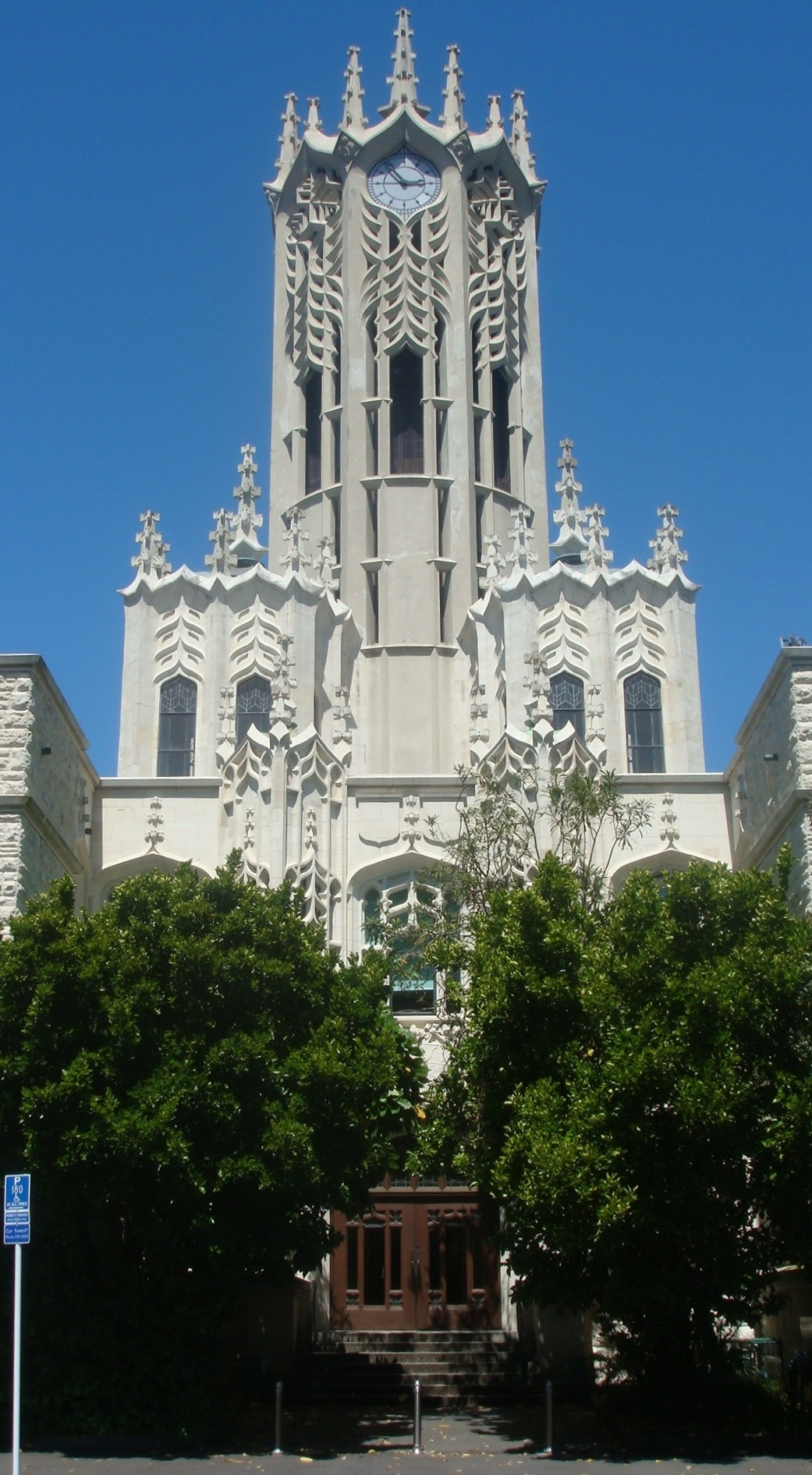

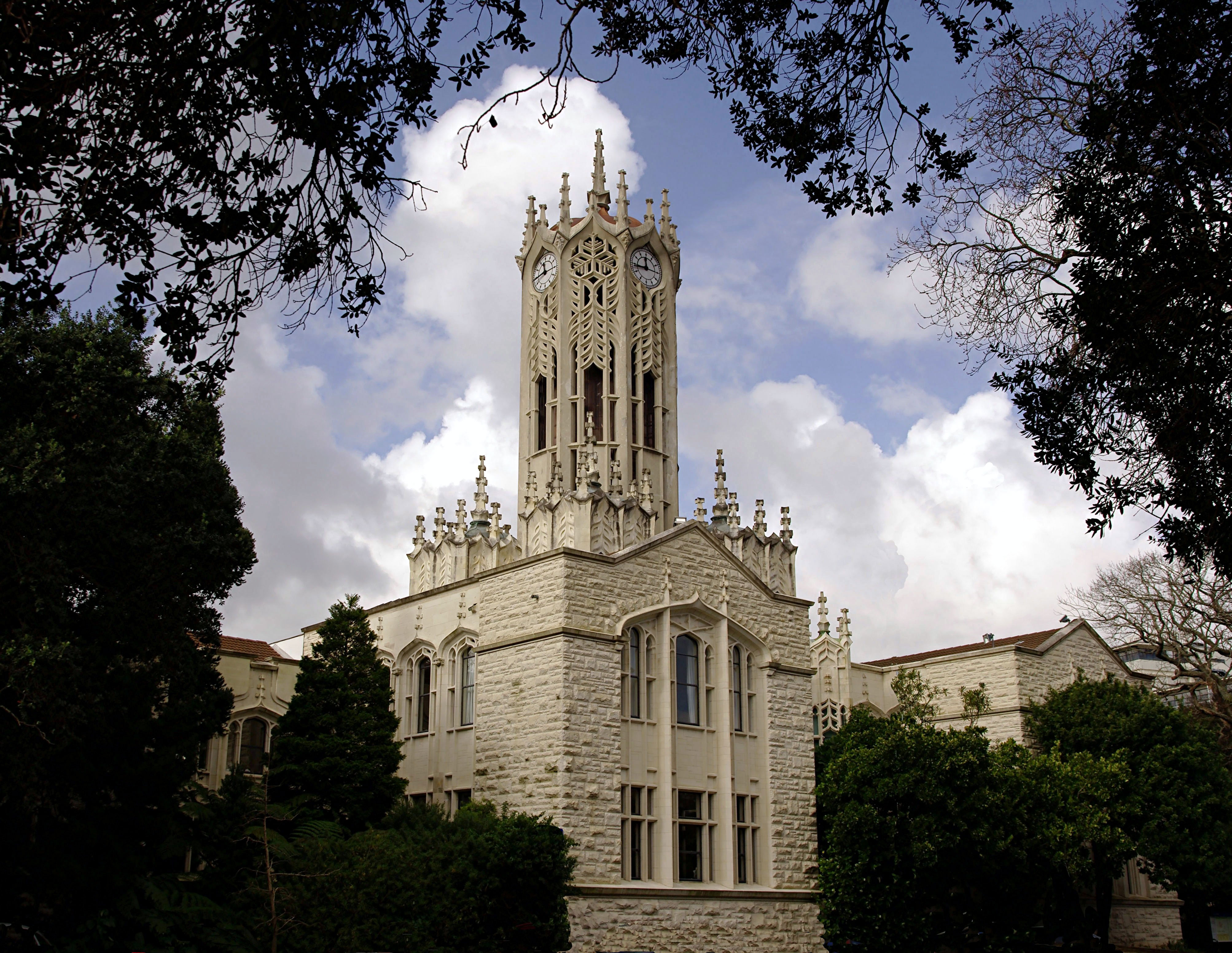

=== Critique ===
The building was radically different to existing architecture in Auckland, and was "much criticised for being insufficiently 'English'" and "out of harmony with our national character" including by the Auckland Education Board architect. A. R. D. Fairburn stated that the design "would scare old ladies in the park." The Minister of Education James Parr suggested that it might look better without the tower. The central tower was also criticised for being too ornate and the buttresses too plain.

Lippincott explained that the tower was “the culminating feature, symbolic of the spiritual aspect of university ideals”. Lippincott defended the design:

“if we turn to Nature as we find her in this fascinating land…we shall produce a building and a tower —not British, surely, but one that shall belong much more intimately to us here in Auckland…and by the same token would be of much greater and more lasting interest to New Zealander and visitor alike”.

=== Modifications ===
The building has been refurbished, modified and cleaned on several occasions. In the 1960s, the interior of the main building was modified after the student union building was constructed. Between 1985 and 1988, the main wing was renovated and strengthened, and the tower was braced with steel and concrete filigree replaced with fibreglass in many places to reduce weight. There was also the installation of steel shear walls and diaphragms. This work received an award from the Institute of Architects.

== Recent use ==
The ClockTower has come to symbolise the University. It now is home to the Vice-Chancellor’s Office, the Equity Office, parts of Academic Services, the Great Hall and the Council Room of the University of Auckland, along with several lecture theatres used for teaching.

The TV show MasterMind New Zealand was filmed in the building in 2016.
