= Merdeka Memorial Clock Tower, Kulim =

Clock tower located in Kulim, Kedah, Malaysia

Coordinates: 5°21′58″N 100°33′11″E

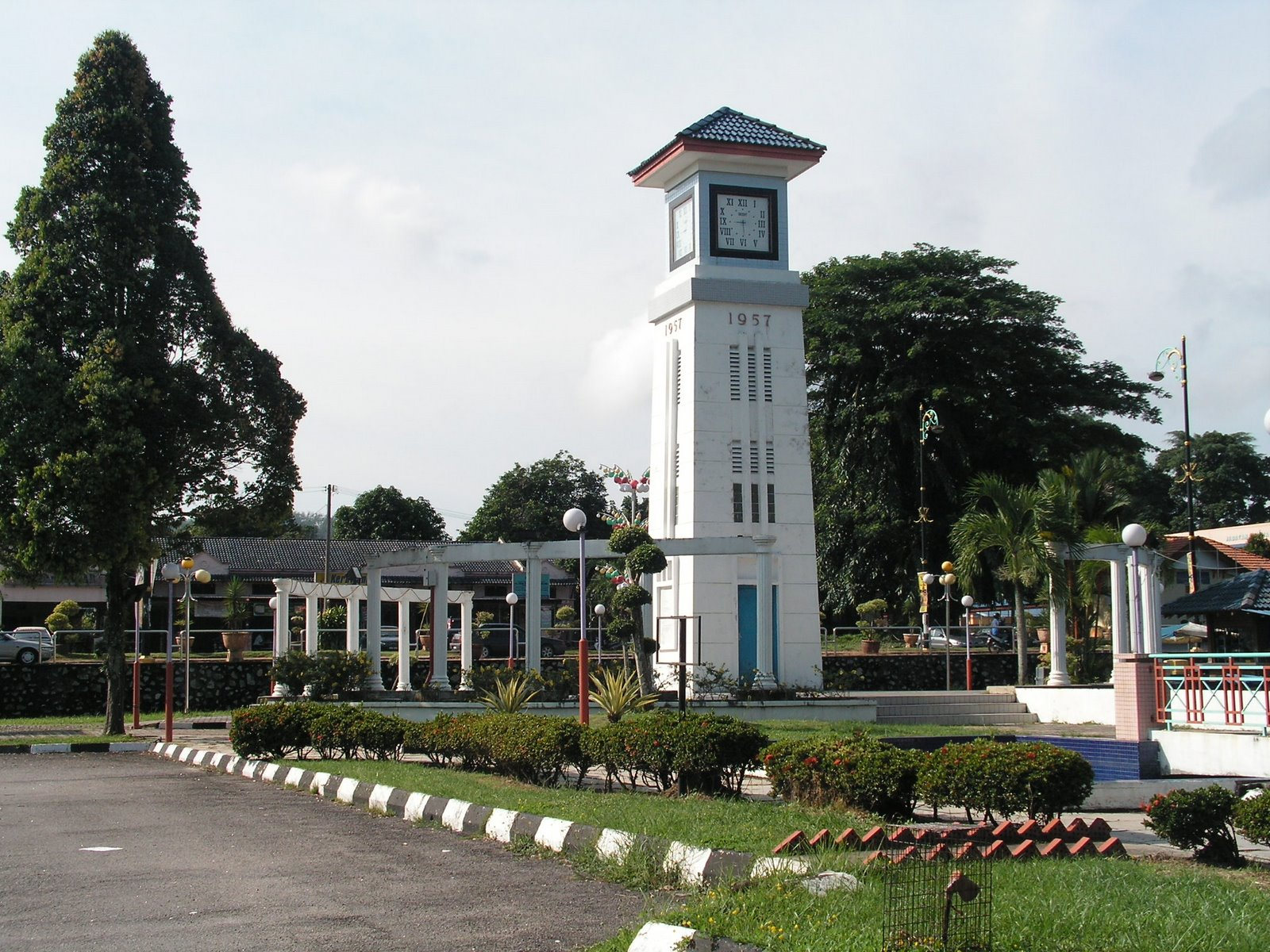
The Merdeka Memorial Clock Tower, Kulim

The Merdeka Memorial Clock Tower is situated in the town of Kulim, Kulim District, Kedah, Malaysia.

The tower commemorates the Federation of Malaya's independence in 1957.

== Background ==
Construction began on 14 June 1957 when the Chief Minister of the Federation of Malaya Tunku Abdul Rahman laid the foundation stone. When complete it was unveiled at a ceremony on 15 September 1957 by the Sultan of Kedah, Sultan Badlishah ibni Almarhum Sultan Abdul Hamid Halim Shah.

The tower bears the date "1957", and has several plaques which refer to the unveiling, as well as the list of donors and members of the fundraising committee.
