= Haikou Clock Tower =

Coordinates: 20.044544738312517°N 110.34161773408893°E

- 海口钟楼
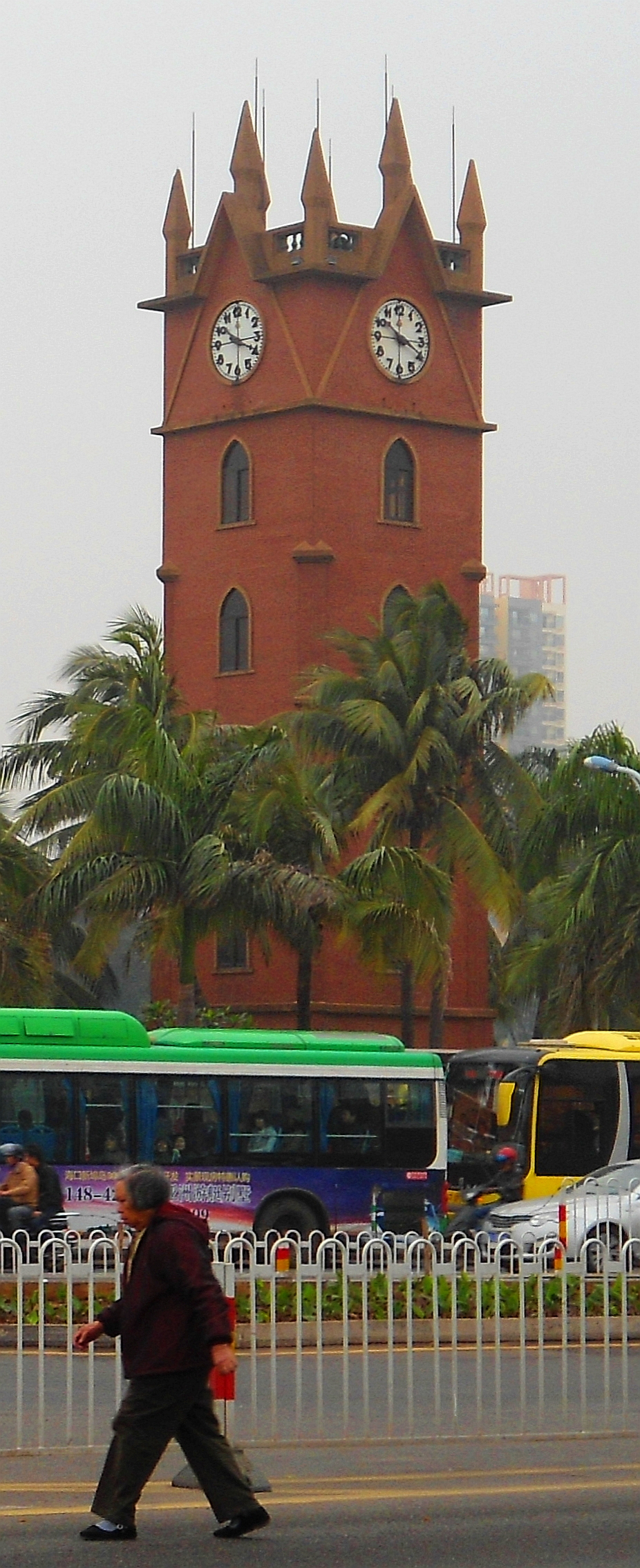
- Interactive map of Haikou Clock Tower
- Location: Bo'ai Road area, Haikou, Hainan, China
- Type: Clock tower
- Material: Red brick
- Height: 27.3 metres (90 ft)
- Beginning date: 1929
- Completion date: 1929

The Haikou Clock Tower (Chinese: 海口钟楼; pinyin: Hǎikǒu Zhōnglóu) is a clock tower located on the south side of the Haidian River, at the north end of the Bo'ai Road area, just west of the Renmin Bridge, in Haikou, Hainan, China. It was originally built around 1928–1929, an initiative by then-trade union leader 周成梅. During the Cultural Revolution it was partially destroyed. In 1987, it was rebuilt near its original site to make room for the new, wider road that runs along the river. The present tower is similar to the original, but not an exact replica. It stands 27.3 metres high and is made of red brick in European Gothic style.
