= Holy Forty Martyrs Church =

Holy Forty Martyrs Church is a Christian temple dedicated to the Forty Martyrs of Sebaste and may refer to:

Bulgaria

- Holy Forty Martyrs Church, Veliko Tarnovo

Syria

- Forty Martyrs Cathedral in Aleppo
- Forty Martyrs Cathedral, Homs

United Kingdom

- Forty Martyrs Church in the Parish of St Bede's Church, Rotherham, South Yorkshire.
