= Victoria Clock Tower, Jacobabad =

Victoria Clock Tower
- Interactive map of the Victoria Clock Tower area
- Alternative names: Ghanta Ghar

General information
- Type: Clock tower
- Location: Jacobabad, Sindh, Pakistan
- Coordinates: 28°17′03″N 68°26′16″E
- Construction started: February 16, 1887
- Opened: November 21, 1888

Design and construction
- Architect: Colonel S. S. Jacob

The Victoria Clock Tower is a clock tower in Jacobabad, Sindh.

== History ==
It was built to commemorate Golden Jubilee of Queen Victoria on February 16, 1887. Designed by Colonel S. S. Jacob, a relative of General John Jacob and the executive engineer of the Jeypore state, the tower was funded through contributions from local landlords, the Hindu Panchayat, and the District Local Fund Board, as indicated by a plaque on the site.

The tower was officially opened on November 21, 1888, by Miss Pritchard, the daughter of the then Commissioner of Sindh.

== Features ==
It features a main tower, surrounded by smaller minarets, with evident structural damage and cracks. The interior features, including floral motifs, Christian crosses, and Mughal-inspired latticed screens, are notable, although the tower's clock is no longer functional.
