= Picuí =

Coordinates: 6°31′S 36°21′W

Picuí (Paraíba) (Paraíba)
- Municipality
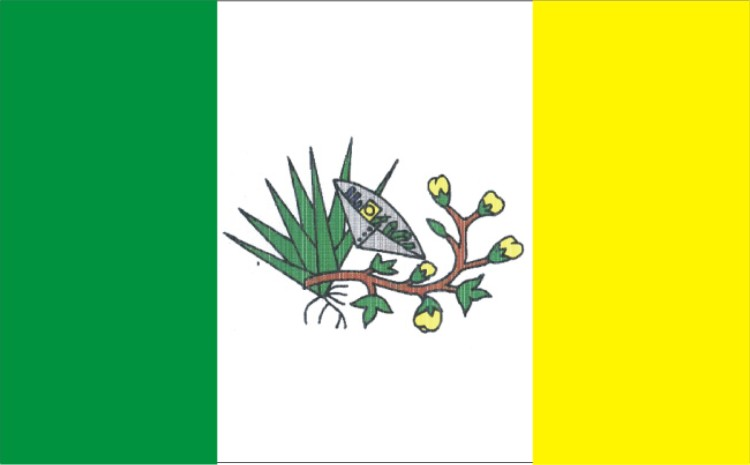
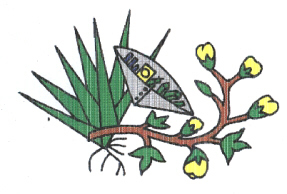
- Flag Coat of arms
- Interactive map of Picuí (Paraíba)
- Country: Brazil
- Region: Northeast
- State: Paraíba
- Mesoregion: Boborema

Population (2020)
  - Total: 18,720
- Time zone: UTC−3 (BRT)

Picuí is a municipality in the state of Paraíba in the Northeast Region of Brazil.

== See also ==
- List of municipalities in Paraíba
