= Torre delle Ore, Lucca =

Coordinates: 43.8434°N 10.5041°E

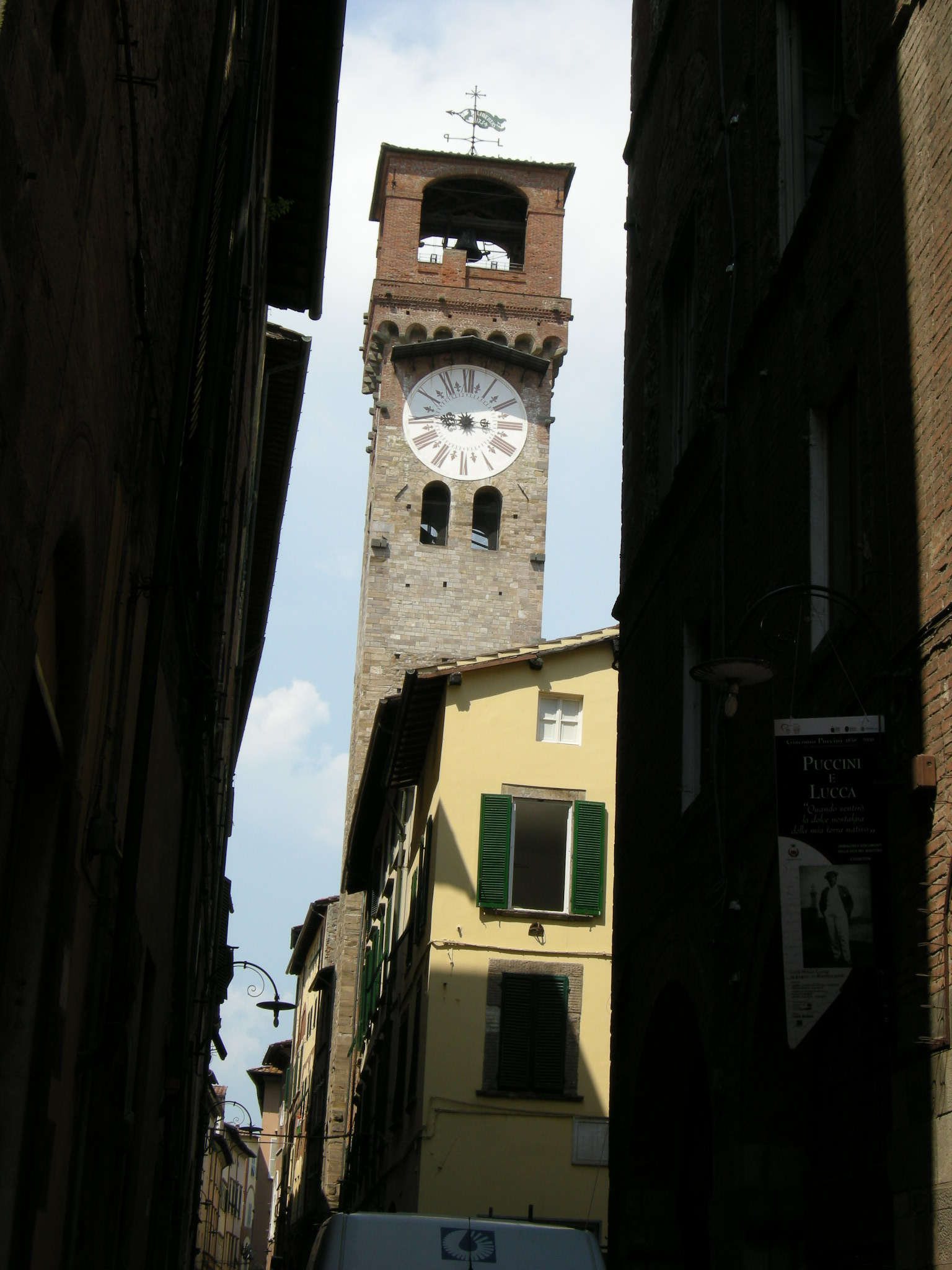
Clock Tower, Lucca

The Torre delle Ore or Torre dell'Orologio is a clock-tower or turret clock located on Via Fillungo in central Lucca, region of Tuscany, Italy.

== History ==
Medieval Lucca, like many medieval cities in Italy abounded with private towers, built for protection, exemplified best today by the remaining towers of San Gimignano. This tower, the tallest in Lucca, was acquired by the government in the 14th century, and in 1390, it was decided to house a clock. In Lucca, the nearby Torre Guinigi with the scenographic tree-scape at the top is more visited. It is now owned by the Comune of Lucca. The present mechanism of the clock dates to the 18th-century. It is unclear what the face of the clock and the mechanism consisted in 1390. Earlier clock towers did have hour markings.

In 2015, it is possible to climb to the tower and view the mechanism. There is a legend associated with a young woman who sold her soul to the devil, but was captured by the devil trying to stop the time of the clock.
