= Our Lady of the Hour Church =

- Our Lady of the Hour Church
- Location: Mosul
- Country: Iraq
- Denomination: Roman Catholic Church

Architecture
- Demolished: April 2016

The Our Lady of the Hour Church (Église Notre-Dame de l'Heure ) also known as the name of the Latin Church, is a Catholic church in the centre of Mosul, in northern Iraq. Built in the 1870s by the Dominican Fathers, it was especially famous for its bell donated by the Empress Eugenia de Montijo, for which it was sometimes called the Clock Church. It was damaged in a 2006 bombing and completely restored in 2023.

== History ==
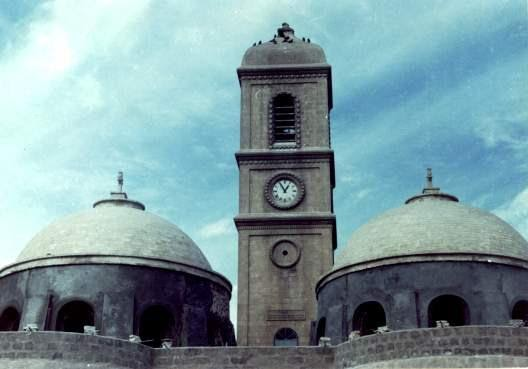
Church in 1980

In 1860, after the massacre of Damascus, during which were killed between 4,000 and 6,000 Christians, Napoleon III sent an expeditionary force to the Levant to help Eastern Christians. A decade later, the Dominicans created in Mosul the Convent of Our Lady of the Hour. In 1880, the Empress Eugenie donated her watch. That was when the first tower was installed on Iraqi soil. In the courtyard of the church it was built as a replica of the Lourdes grotto with a statue of Our Lady of Miracles, where the faithful come to pray.

The Church has become an important cultural and academic centre, which hosted until the 2006 bombing a girls' school and the first printing press in Iraq. Strong relationships between members of different religions and cultures have also long celebrated there: the Church offered a space for encounter and dialogue between Christians, Yazidis, Sunni and Shia Muslims, as well as Arabs, Assyrians, and Kurds.

In 2006, the Church was partially destroyed in a bombing during the Iraq War. In the summer of 2014, Christians in the Nineveh Plain fell into the hands of the Islamic State. Most of the forty-five churches were destroyed, converted into mosques or prisons. On April 24, 2016, it was reported that the Latin Church was destroyed by terrorists after looting antiquities and works of art. Later reports indicated the clock tower was actually still standing. The Church itself was used as a weapons warehouse and torture chamber by the jihadists.

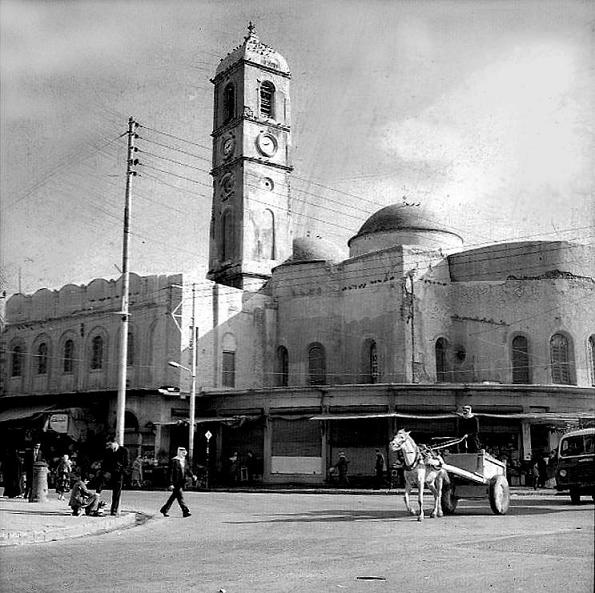
The church in 1940

In 2020, UNESCO joined the collaborative efforts of the Dominican friars to rebuild the Church as a focus for cultural encounter. On 1 January 2024, the Church was reopened with a Mass celebrated by the Master of the Dominican Order, Fr Gerard Timoner.

== See also ==
- Roman Catholicism in Iraq
- Destruction of cultural heritage by ISIL
