= São Mamede, Paraíba =

Coordinates: 6°55′37″S 37°05′45″W

São Mamede
- Municipality
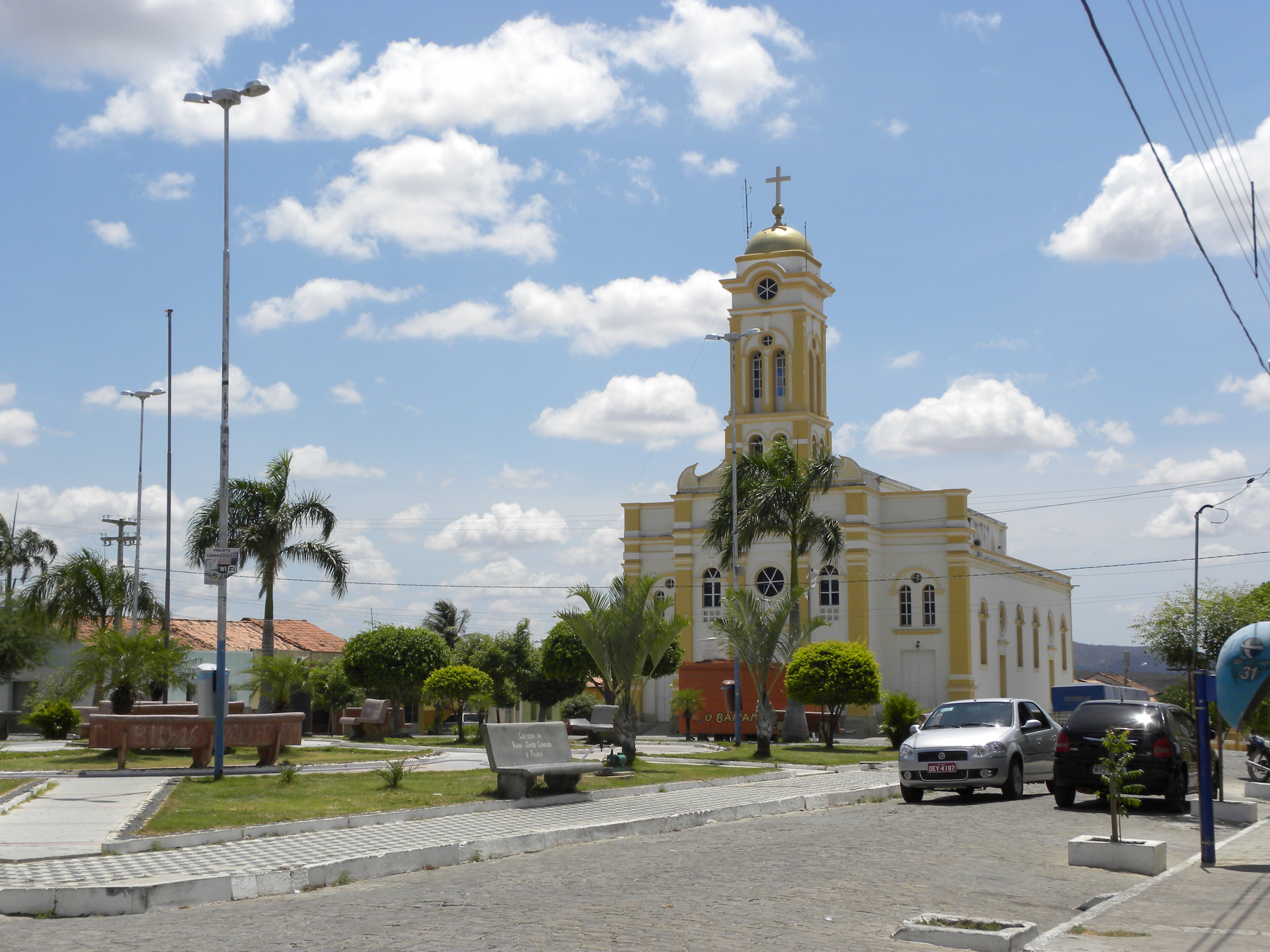

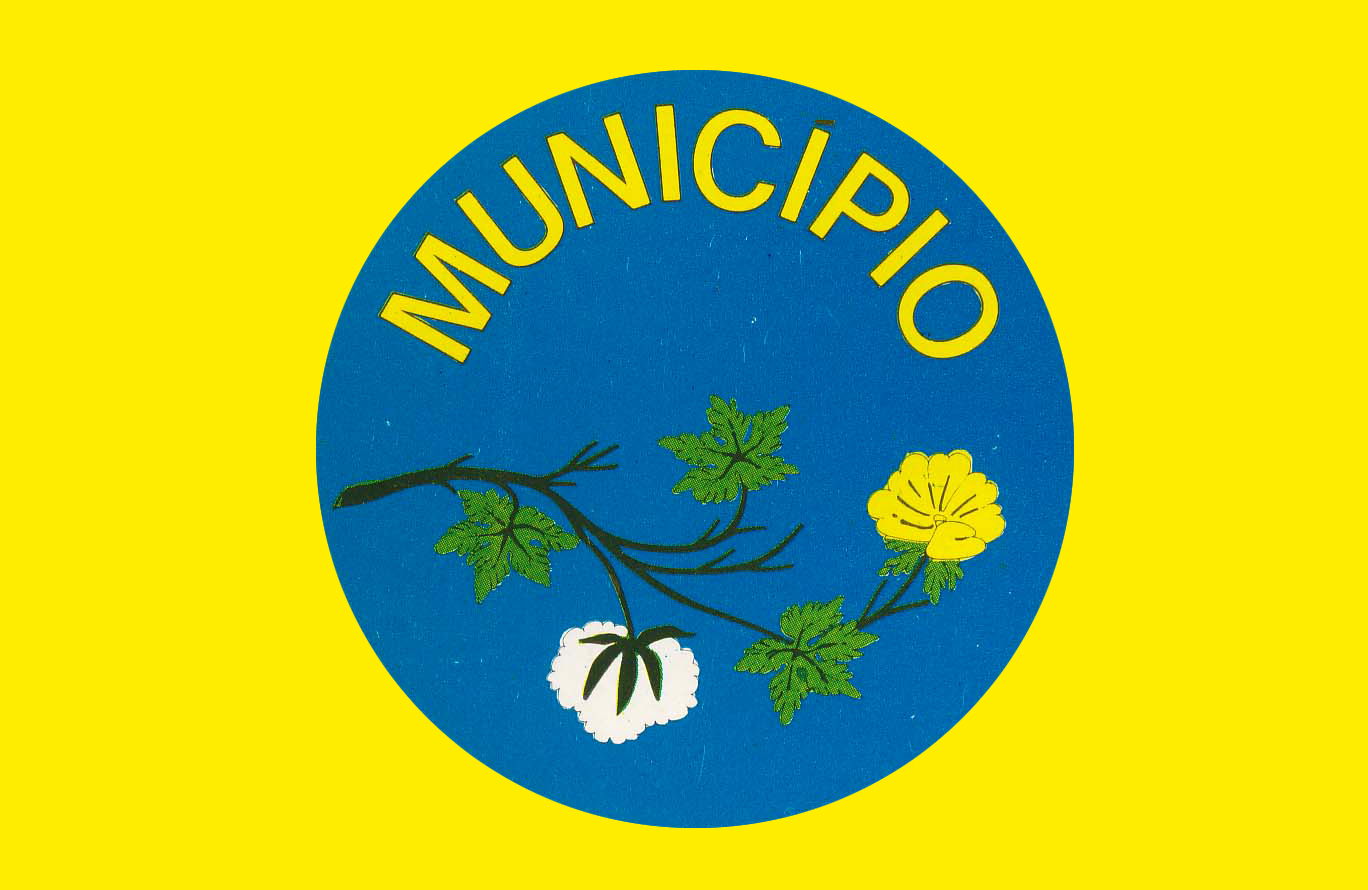
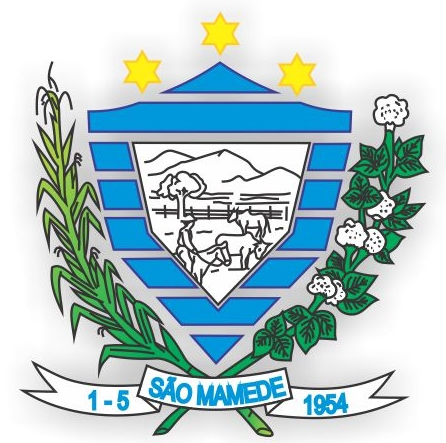
- Flag Coat of arms
- Interactive map of São Mamede
- Country: Brazil
- Region: Northeast
- State: Paraíba
- Mesoregion: Boborema

Population (2020)
  - Total: 7,702
- Time zone: UTC−3 (BRT)

São Mamede (Central northeastern portuguese pronunciation: [ˈsɐ̃w mɐˈmɛdĭ]) is a municipality in the state of Paraíba in the Northeast Region of Brazil.

== See also ==
- List of municipalities in Paraíba
