= List of churches in Ulcinj =

This is a list of churches in Ulcinj. Montenegro (Albanian: Ulqin).

| Nr. | Name | Image | Country | Town / Village | Year | Remarks |
|---|---|---|---|---|---|---|
| 1 | Church-Mosque; Church of St. Maria | | Montenegro | Kalaja, Ulcinj; Ulqin | 1510 | It was built as a Church of Saint Maria in 1510, and in 1693 was turned into a mosque. Now it is the archeological museum of the city. The church-mosque is located in Kalaja - Ulcinj's old town. |
| 2 | Church of St. Joseph | | Montenegro | Bjela Gora, Ulcinj; Ulqin | 1875 | |
| 3 | Church of St. Vasilija | | Montenegro | Zoganje; Zogaj | 18th century | |
| 4 | Church of St. George | | Montenegro | Near Bojana | 19th century | |
| 5 | Church of Bratica | | Montenegro | Bratica; Braticë | 20th century | |
| 6 | Church of Klezna | | Montenegro | Klezna; Kllezën | 19th century | |
| 7 | Orthodox Church of St. Nicholas | | Montenegro | Meterizi, Ulcinj; Ulqin | 1890 | In the place where is the church, early was a XV monastery, than a mosque. The mosque with Muslim cemetery was demolished by Montenegrins and in that place was built the church and orthodox cemetery. |
| 8 | Church of St. Jovan | | Montenegro | Šas; Shas | circa 1300 | Damaged by Mongols. |
| 9 | Church of St. Maria | | Montenegro | Šas; Shas | circa 1300 | Damaged by Mongols. |
| 9 | Church of St. Marc | | Montenegro | Štoj; Shtoj | 2006 | |

== See also ==
- List of mosques in Ulcinj
