= Clock Tower of Ulcinj =

- Sahat kula
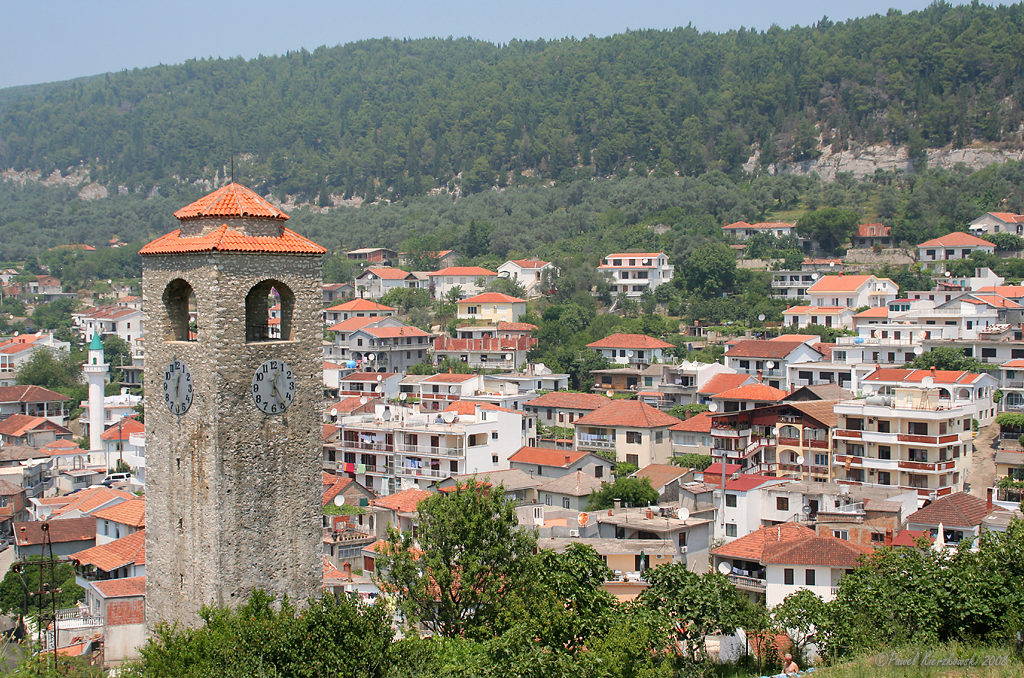
- Sahat kula as seen from Pinjesh Hill, in background is Lami Mosque

- Location within Montenegro

General information
- Type: Tower
- Architectural style: Ottoman architecture
- Location: Ulcinj, Montenegro
- Coordinates: 41.929996°N 19.208114°E
- Completed: 1754

The Clock Tower of Ulcinj (Montenegrin: Sahat kula, Сахат кула, Albanian: Sahat Kulla, Turkish: Saat Kulesi), was built in Ulcinj, Montenegro in 1754 during the Ottoman Empire's rule over the city, with the help of donations made by the citizens of Ulcinj. The name comes from the Turkish Saat Kulesi which literally means "Clock Tower" in English.

== Purposes ==
The main purposes of the tower were calling people to their jobs, reminding them of their duties and making them aware of the time. Its location was carefully chosen, as it can be seen or its clock heard from every part of the town. It has a rectangular base, and it was made of a nicely irregular cut stone. The Sahat Kulla is located near the Namazgjahu Mosque and Kryepazari Mosque. For a long time there used to be a man in Ulcinj whose title was muvekit (Ottoman Turkish for "timekeeper"), and his duty was to take care of the correctness of the clock on the Tower.
