= List of museums in Montenegro =

This is a list of museums in Montenegro.

== List ==
- Cetinje Royal Palace
- Church-Mosque of Ulcinj
- Heritage Museum Pljevlja
- "Josip Broz Tito" Art Gallery of the Nonaligned Countries
- King Nikola's Palace
- Museum of Local History in Ulcinj
- National Museum of Montenegro
- Our Lady of the Rocks
- Herceg Novi Treasure
- Cetinje Art Museum
- Biljarda Residence
- Museum of Money
- Museum of living history
- Tivat: Submarine Hero and people the heros
- Maritime Museum, Montenegro
- The Cat Museum
- Crvena Stijena archaeological site
- Danilovgrad Farm
- Museum of the People's Hero and Writer Marko Miljanov
- Polimski Museum

== See also ==
- Culture of Montenegro
- List of Yugoslav World War II monuments and memorials in Montenegro
- Tourism in Montenegro
