= List of mosques in Ulcinj =

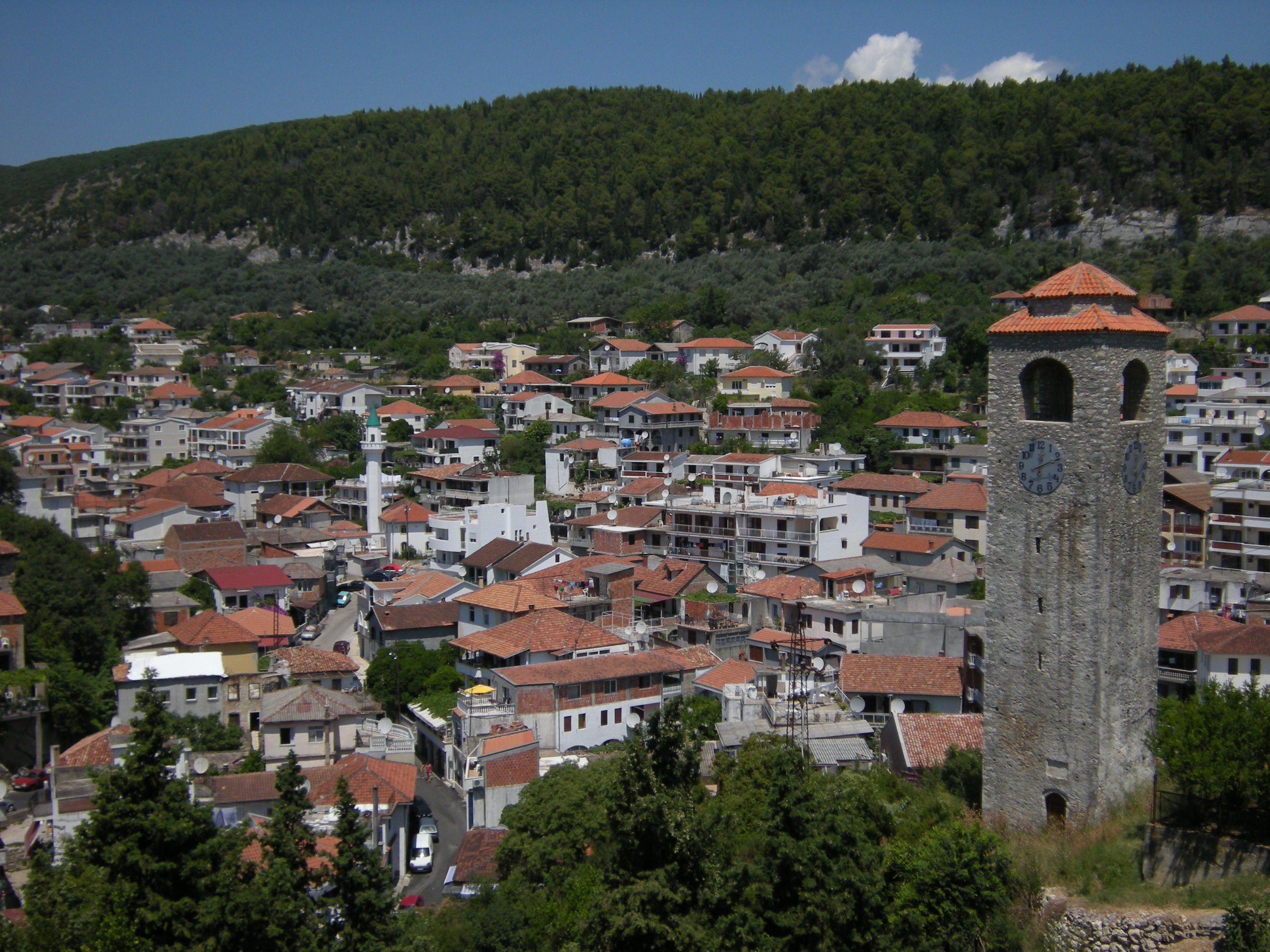
Oriental Center of Ulcinj, Sahat Kula and Lami Mosque

This is a list of mosques in Ulcinj, Montenegro (Albanian: Ulqin).

== Present mosques ==
Nr.	Name	Image	Country	Town / Village	Year	Remarks
1	Sailors' Mosque; Seaman's Mosque; Rana Mosque		Montenegro	Rana, Ulcinj; Ulqin	2012	It was built in the 14th century, was demolished by Serbian forces in 1931 and was rebuilt in 2012.
2	Lami Mosque; Mahalla e Re Mosque		Montenegro	Mahalla e Re, Ulcinj; Ulqin	1689	Built by Haxhi Alia.
3	Pasha's Mosque with hamams		Montenegro	Rana, Ulcinj; Ulqin	1719	The only mosque in Montenegro with "Turkish" baths. Built by Klic Aliu from Istanbul.
4	Namazgjahu Mosque; Bazar Mosque; Mezgjahu Mosque; Great Mosque		Montenegro	Çarshia, Ulcinj; Ulqin	1728	Main mosque of Ulcinj, built by Suleiman Mujali.
5	Kryepazari Mosque; Maja-pazari Mosque		Montenegro	Çarshia, Ulcinj; Ulqin	1749	Built by Nuradin-beg(Nuradin Bej).
6	Bregu Mosque		Montenegro	Meraja, Ulcinj; Ulqin	1783	Built by Ahmet Gjyli.
7	Kolomza Mosque		Montenegro	Kolonza; Kollomzë	1813	
8	Pistulla Mosque		Montenegro	Pistula; Pistull	1890	
9	Zogaj Mosque		Montenegro	Zoganje; Zogaj	1760	
10	Kllezna Mosque		Montenegro	Gornja Klezna; Këllezna e Epërme	1900	Enlarged in 2013.
11	Krythë Mosque		Montenegro	Krute; Krythë	1725	
12	Katërkollë Mosque; Vladimir Mosque		Montenegro	Vladimir; Katërkollë	1971	
13	Shas Mosque		Montenegro	Svač; Shas	1800	
14	Shtodër Mosque		Montenegro	Štodra; Shtodër	1835	
15	Millë Mosque		Montenegro	Mide; Millë	1914	
16	Bojkë Mosque		Montenegro	Bojke; Bojkë	1998	
17	Brajshë Mosque		Montenegro	Brajše; Brajshë	1785	
18	Selita Mosque		Montenegro	Seljita; Selitë	1835	
19	Dragaj Mosque		Montenegro	Draginje; Draginjë	1856	
20	Sukobin Mosque		Montenegro	Sukobin; Sukobinë	1820	
21	Rashtisha e Poshtme Mosque		Montenegro	Donji Raštiš; Rashtisha e Poshtme	1774	
22	Rashtisha e Epërme Mosque		Montenegro	Gornji Raštiš; Rashtisha e Epërme	1983	
23	Kravari i Poshtëm Mosque		Montenegro	Donji Kravari; Kravari i Poshtëm	1875	
24	Kravari i Epërm Mosque		Montenegro	Gornji Kravari; Kravari i Epërm	?	
25	Leskoc Mosque; Leskovac Mosque		Montenegro	Leskovac; Leskoc	1880	Restored partially in 2013.
26	Kërruç Mosque		Montenegro	Kruče; Kërruç	1890	

== Former mosques ==
Nr.	Name	Image	Country	Town / Village	Year	Remarks
1	Church-Mosque; Kalaja Mosque; Halil Skura Mosque		Montenegro	Kalaja, Ulcinj; Ulqin	1510	It was built as a Church of Saint Maria in 1510, and in 1693 was turned into a mosque. Now it is the archeological museum of the city. The church-mosque is located in Kalaja - Ulcinj's old town.
2	Meraja Mosque		Montenegro	Meraja, Ulcinj; Ulqin	1779	Built by captain Likaceni from Ulcinj. In 1968 it was demolished by the Yugoslavian communist government, with the claim that the mosque represent excessive nationalism. Nowadays, in that location is created the semi-functional parking.
3	Meterizi Mosque		Montenegro	Meteriz, Ulcinj; Ulqin	1670	The mosque already in ruins was demolished in 1890 by Montenegrins. Nowadyas, there exist a church. The mosque also had its own cemetery in ruins that was destroyed and turned into an olive grove.
