= Museum of Local History in Ulcinj =

- Ulcinjski muzej
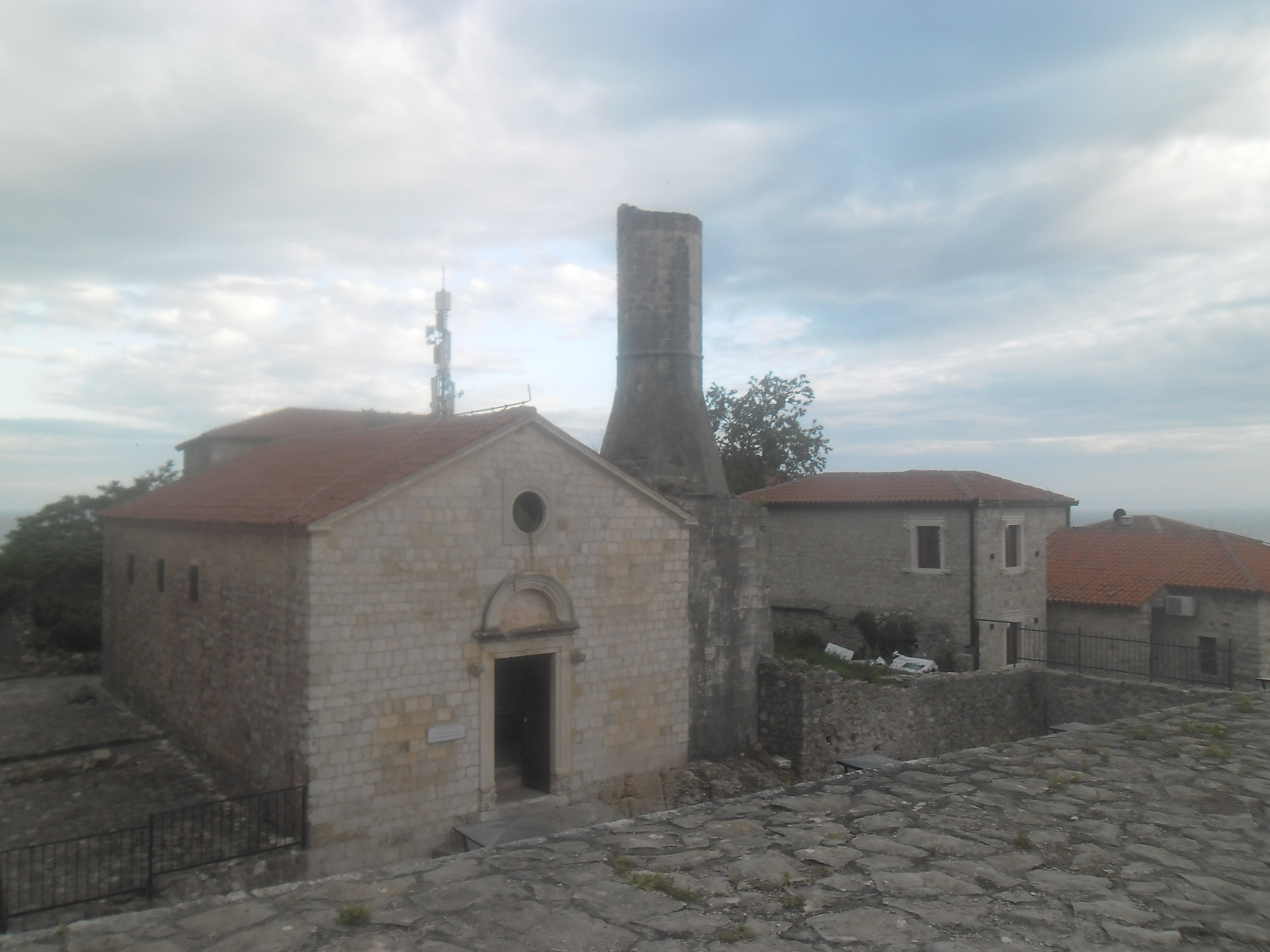
- Church-Mosque, part of the museum.

- Museum of Ulcinj
- Established: 1975
- Location: Kalaja, Ulcinj, Montenegro
- Coordinates: 41.924616°N 19.201186°E
- Type: Local museum
- Owner: Ulcinj Municipality

Museum of Local History in Ulcinj or simply Museum of Ulcinj (Albanian: Muzeu i Ulqinit) is a local museum located in Kalaja, part of Ulcinj, Montenegro.

Through exhibits from the archaeological, ethnographic and artistic collection, in the Museum of Local History you can learn about life in Ulcinj from the 5th century BC to the Turkish period.

The museum is located in the Church-Mosque, which was built as a church in 1510, and had been transformed to a mosque by the Turks in 1571. Within the archaeological collection, there is an exhibition of antique Greek and Roman ceramics, glass, coins as well as items which show the time of the sovereignty of the Montenegrin dynasties of Vojislavljević and Balšić. In the part of the exhibition that displays items from the ethnographic collection, there are traditional costumes, mostly Albanian, jewelry and local handcraft which show the variety of folklore creativity in this area.

The museum is divided into:

- Archaeological Museum (in the Church-Mosque building)
- Ethnological Museum
- Art Gallery (in the Tower of the Balšić)
- Other archaeological exhibits (in the cells surrounding the slave market)
