= Coat of arms of Ulcinj =

- Shield: Kalaja; liburnian ship; olive branch; Sun; Adriatic Sea
- Use: Ulcinj Municipality

The coat of arms of Ulcinj has the shape of a shield on which are assembled some of the main characteristic of Ulcinj, the stone Castle on the sea shore, the symbol of Sun set on the Castle, olive branches with fruits and antique Liburnian ship with wolf head at the deck returned on the boat.

Symbols	Image	Remarks
Kalaja		The most important site of Ulcinj, the nucleus of the whole town.
Sun		
Olive branches		Olive branches symbolise the olive tree that is the main characteristic of flora in this area.
Liburna		Liburna symbolise the relation of Ulcinj with the sea, especially the maritime and fishing.
Wolf		The name of Ulcinj, that locally is known by the Albanian word Ulqin that derived from the illyrian word Ulkin. Ulk is an illyrian word (Albanian: Ujk) that means wolf, the town is named after this mammal.
