= Pasha's Mosque =

Mosque in Ulcinj, Montenegro

- Pašina džamija, Пашина џамија Xhamia e Pashës
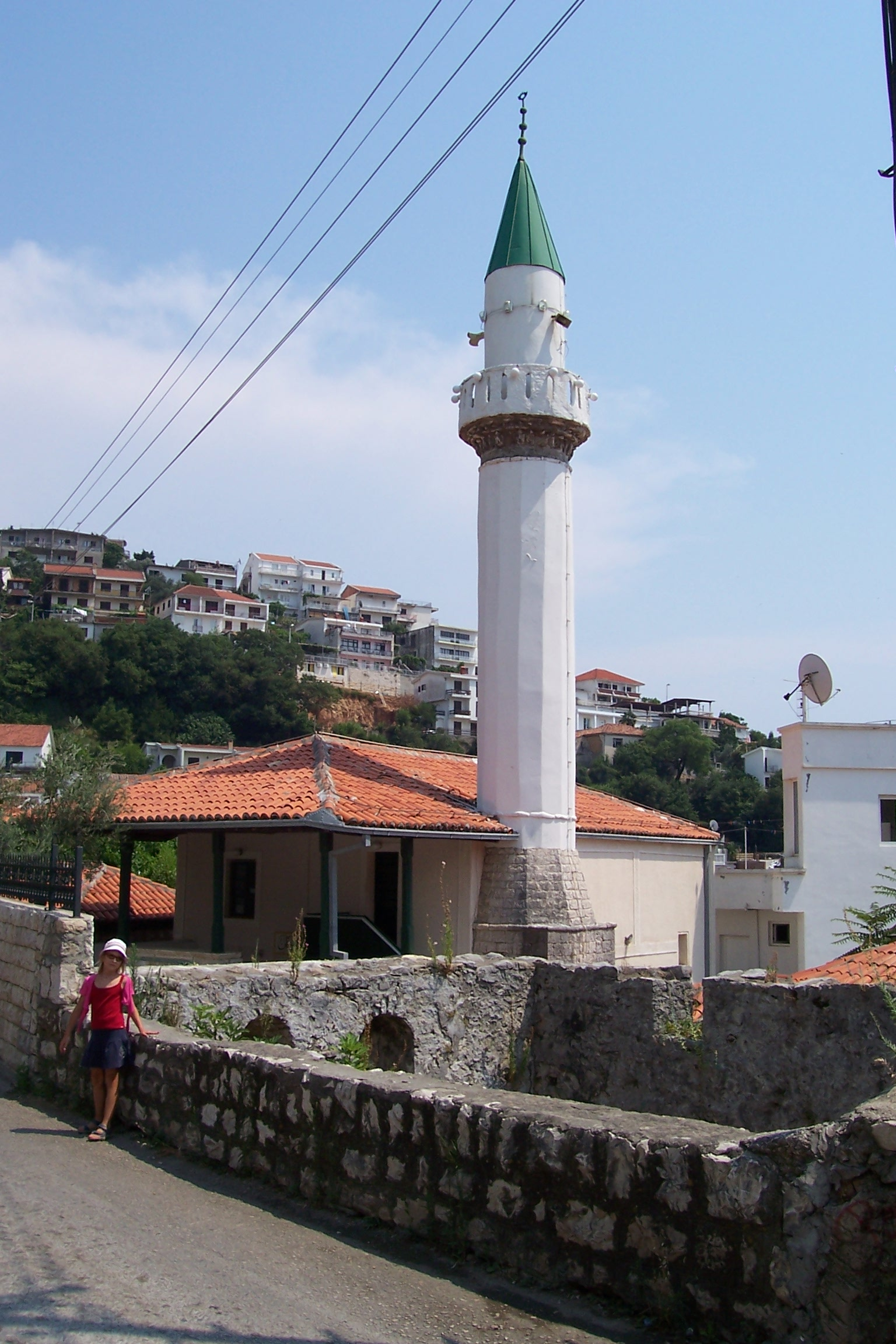

- Location within Montenegro

Religion
- Affiliation: Islam

Location
- Municipality: Ulcinj
- Country: Montenegro
- Interactive map of Pasha's Mosque
- Coordinates: 41°55′33.1″N 19°12′13.3″E

Architecture
- Type: mosque
- Style: Ottoman Architecture
- Completed: 1719; 307 years ago

Specifications
- Capacity: 500 worshippers
- Minaret: 1

Pasha's Mosque (Montenegrin: Пашина џамија, romanized: Pašina džamija; Albanian: Xhamia e Pashës) is one of six mosques in the city of Ulcinj, in Montenegro.

== History ==
It was built by citizens of Ulcinj using goods from captured Venetian ships following an attack on Ulcinj by the Republic of Venice. The mosque was built in honour of admiral Kılıç Ali Paşa. This mosque also has a hamam, built before the mosque was completed. This hamam is the only hamam in Montenegro. The Friday khutbah is given in Arabic and Albanian language. It is located approximately 100m from the Sailor's Mosque.

== See also ==
- Ulcinj
- List of mosques in Ulcinj
- Sailor's Mosque
