= Bregu Mosque =

Mosque in Ulcinj, Montenegro

Coordinates: 41°55′50.8″N 19°12′41.7″E

- Xhamia e Bregut

Religion
- Affiliation: Islam

Location
- Location: Ulcinj, Montenegro
- Interactive map of Bregu Mosque

Architecture
- Type: mosque
- Style: Ottoman
- Completed: 1783
- Minaret: 1

The Bregu Mosque is one of the six mosques in Ulcinj, Montenegro, and it is located in the neighbourhood Meraja. It was built by captain Ahmet Gjyli from Ulcinj in 1783, near his own house. It was significantly damaged in the earthquake in 1979 and in 1986 was reconstructed. The Friday Khutbah is given in Arabic and Albanian.

== See also ==
- Ulcinj
- List of mosques in Ulcinj
