= Lami Mosque =

Mosque in Ulcinj, Montenegro

Lami Mosque Xhamia e Lamit Ljamova Džamija
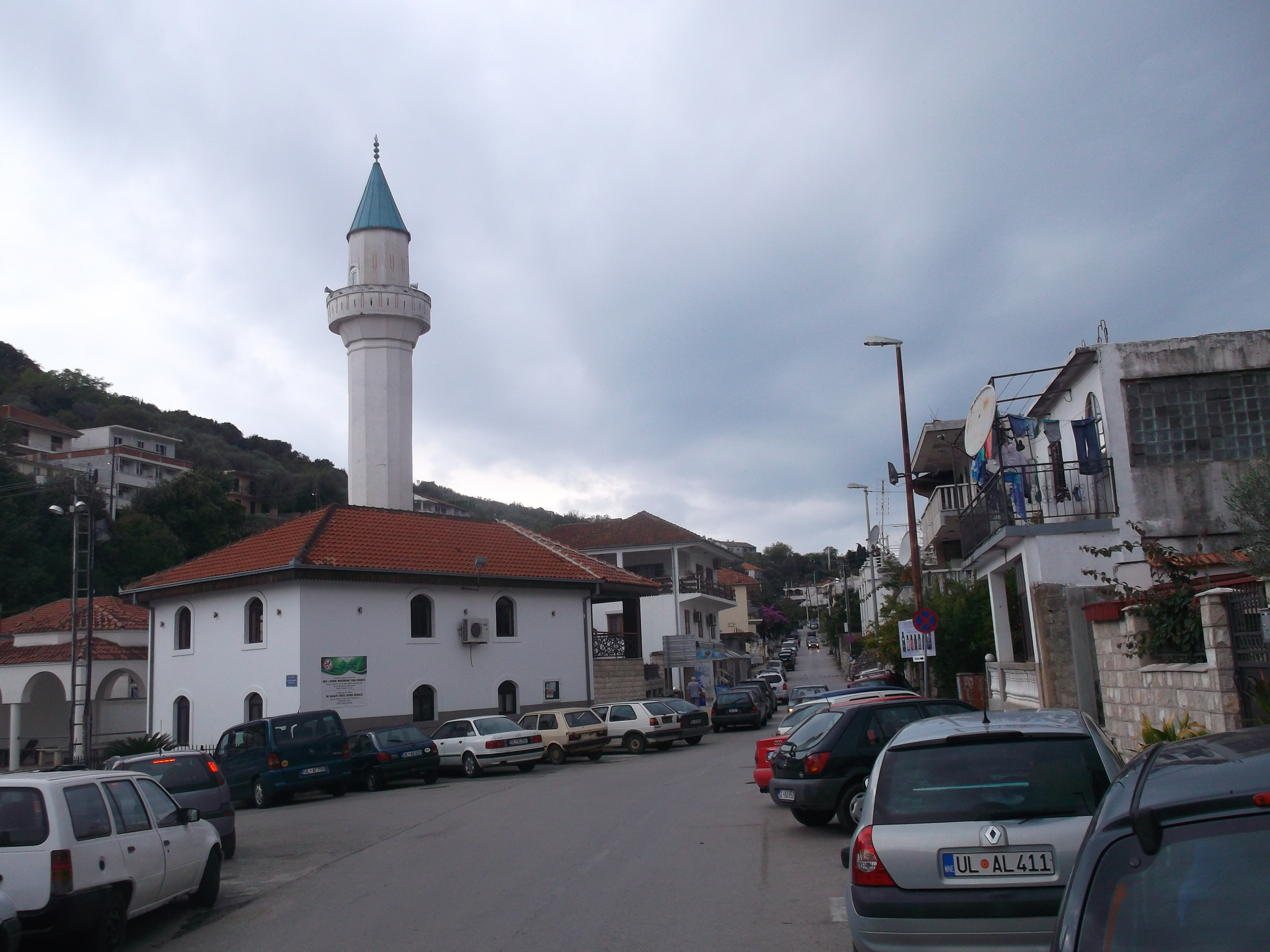
- Marketplace of Ulcinj, Sahat Kula and Lami Mosque

- Location within Montenegro

Religion
- Affiliation: Islam

Location
- Municipality: Ulcinj
- Country: Montenegro
- Interactive map of Lami Mosque; Xhamia e Lamit; Ljamova Džamija
- Coordinates: 41°55′53.0″N 19°12′24.3″E

Architecture
- Type: mosque
- Style: Ottoman Architecture
- Completed: 1689; 337 years ago

Specifications
- Capacity: 150 worshippers
- Minaret: 1

The Lami Mosque is one of the six mosques in Ulcinj, Montenegro.

== History ==
It was built by Hajji Alia in 1689. The Friday Khutbah is given in three languages, in Arabic, Albanian and Bosnian language. Next to the mosque is the gasulhane, where the bodies of the dead are washed in preparation for burial. The funeral xhenaze namaz follows washing.

In 1968, the anti-Albanian Yugoslav government wanted to destroy the mosque, but the bravery of Imam Ibrahim Llolla to stand in front of the Yugoslavian police saved the mosque, as he was ready to sacrifice himself for the mosque. However, the Yugoslavian police destroyed another, the Meraja Mosque.

== See also ==
- List of mosques in Ulcinj
