= Kryepazari Mosque =

Mosque in Ulcinj, Montenegro

- Location within Montenegro

Religion
- Affiliation: Islam

Location
- Municipality: Ulcinj
- Country: Montenegro
- Interactive map of Kryepazari Mosque
- Coordinates: 41°55′49.9″N 19°12′33.0″E

Architecture
- Type: mosque
- Style: Ottoman architecture
- Completed: 1749
- Minaret: 1

The Kryepazari Mosque, also called Majapazari Mosque is one of the six mosques in Ulcinj. It was built by Nuradin-Beg from Ulcinj in 1749. It was destroyed in the earthquake in 1979, and 16 years later it was renewed by the donations of the local people. The Friday Khutbah is given in Arabic and Albanian. To the complex of this mosque also belong the main office of the Islamic religious community of Ulcinj, a library and a kindergarten.

== See also ==
- Ulcinj
- List of mosques in Ulcinj
