= Namazgjahu Mosque =

Mosque in Ulcinj, Montenegro

Namazgjahu Mosque Xhamia e Namazgjahut
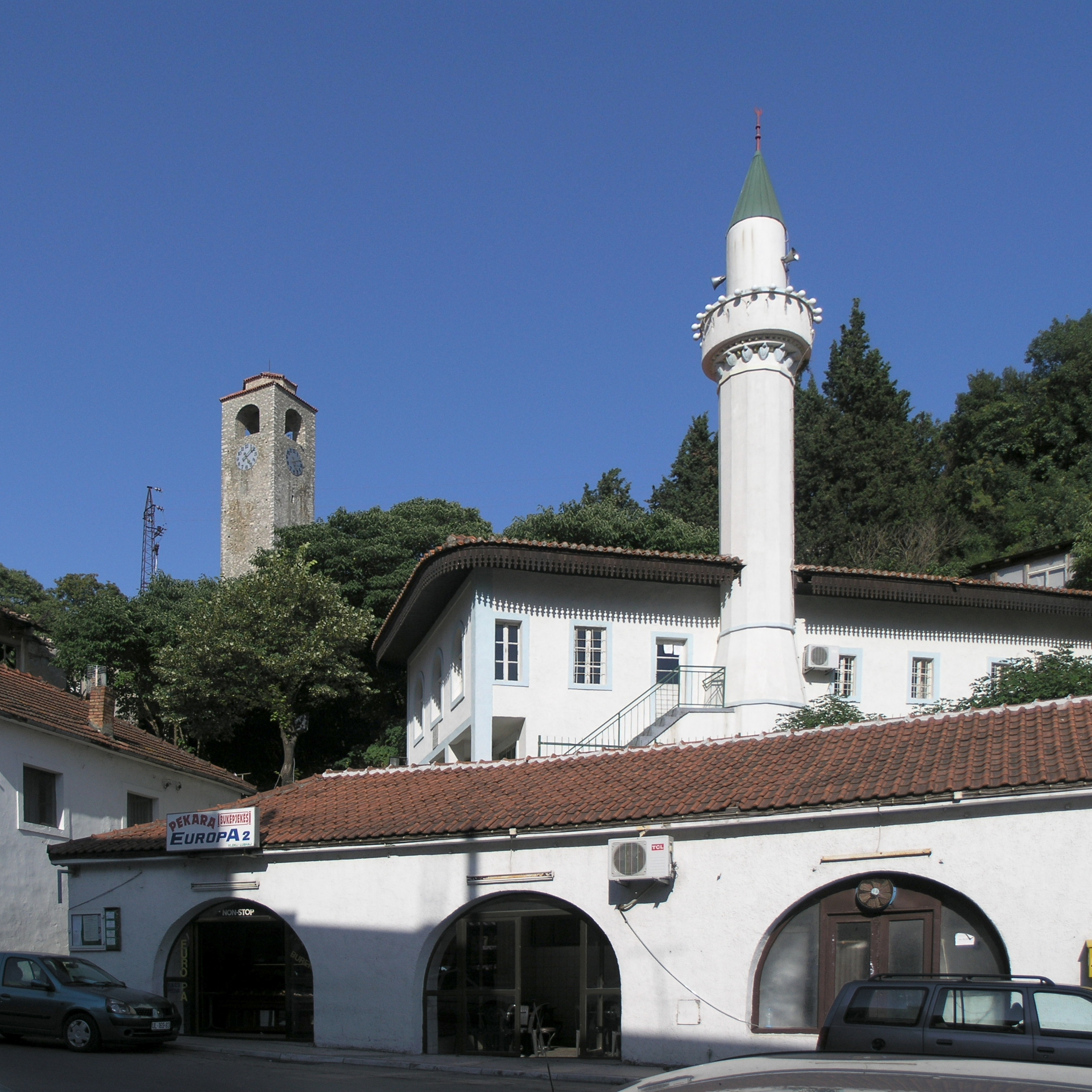

- Location within Montenegro

Religion
- Affiliation: Islam

Location
- Municipality: Ulcinj
- Country: Montenegro
- Interactive map of Namazgjahu Mosque; Xhamia e Namazgjahut
- Coordinates: 41°55′47.1″N 19°12′27.3″E

Architecture
- Type: mosque
- Style: Ottoman Architecture
- Completed: 1728
- Minaret: 1

The Namazgjahu Mosque (Albanian: Xhamia e Namazgjahut), also called Big Mosque (Albanian: Xhamia e Madhe) is one of the six mosques in Ulcinj, Montenegro, the biggest one.

== History ==
It was built by Suleiman Mujali from Ulcinj in 1728. The Friday Khutbah is given in Arabic and Albanian language. The facade of the mosque is being restored since 2011.

== See also ==
- Ulcinj
- List of mosques in Ulcinj
