= Church-Mosque of Ulcinj =

Coordinates: 41.9246°N 19.2013°E

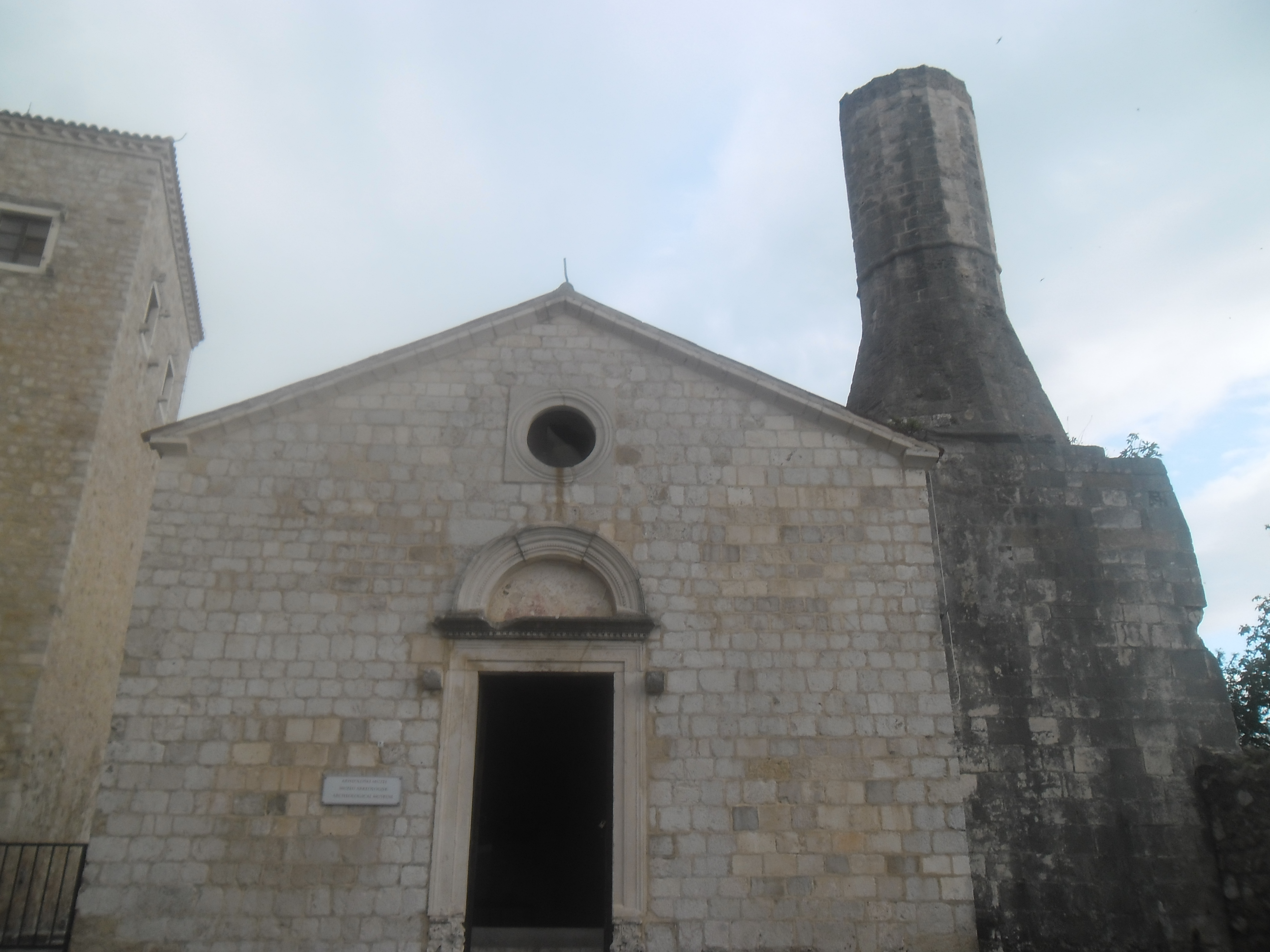

Religion
- Affiliation: Catholic Church (1510-1571); Islam (1571-1880)
- Region: Balkans

Location
- Location: Ulcinj, Montenegro
- Municipality: Ulcinj Municipality
- Interactive map of Church-Mosque of Ulcinj

Architecture
- Type: church, mosque
- Style: Renaissance architecture, Ottoman architecture
- Completed: 1510; 516 years ago

Specifications
- Minaret: 1 (heavily damaged)
- Materials: stone

The Church-Mosque of Ulcinj (Montenegrin: Crkva-Džamija; Albanian: Kishë-Xhamia), also called Imperial Mosque, Halil Skura Mosque, Kalaja Mosque or Church of St. Maria is a former church and mosque located in Ulcinj, Montenegro.

== History ==
During the rule of the Venetians the Church of St. Maria was built in the Old Town in 1510, which was turned into a mosque, Mosque of the Sultan Selim II as soon as the Turks conquered Ulcinj in 1571. It used to be the so-called Xhamia Mbretrore – Imperial Mosque, as it did not have any Wakf from which it could have been financed at the beginning, so that its employees were paid from the state budget. Hajji Halil Skura added a minaret in 1693 made of nicely cut stone, in the lower part, on a rectangular base, which was made narrower on top. The religious purpose of this mosque ended in 1880, when the Montenegrins conquered Ulcinj. This religious building also had a maktab. All the Ulcinj reises (captains) would gather there when an important decision had to be made.

The building hosts the town museum.
