= Ulcinj Castle =

Castle in Ulcinj, Montenegro

- Ulcinj, Montenegro
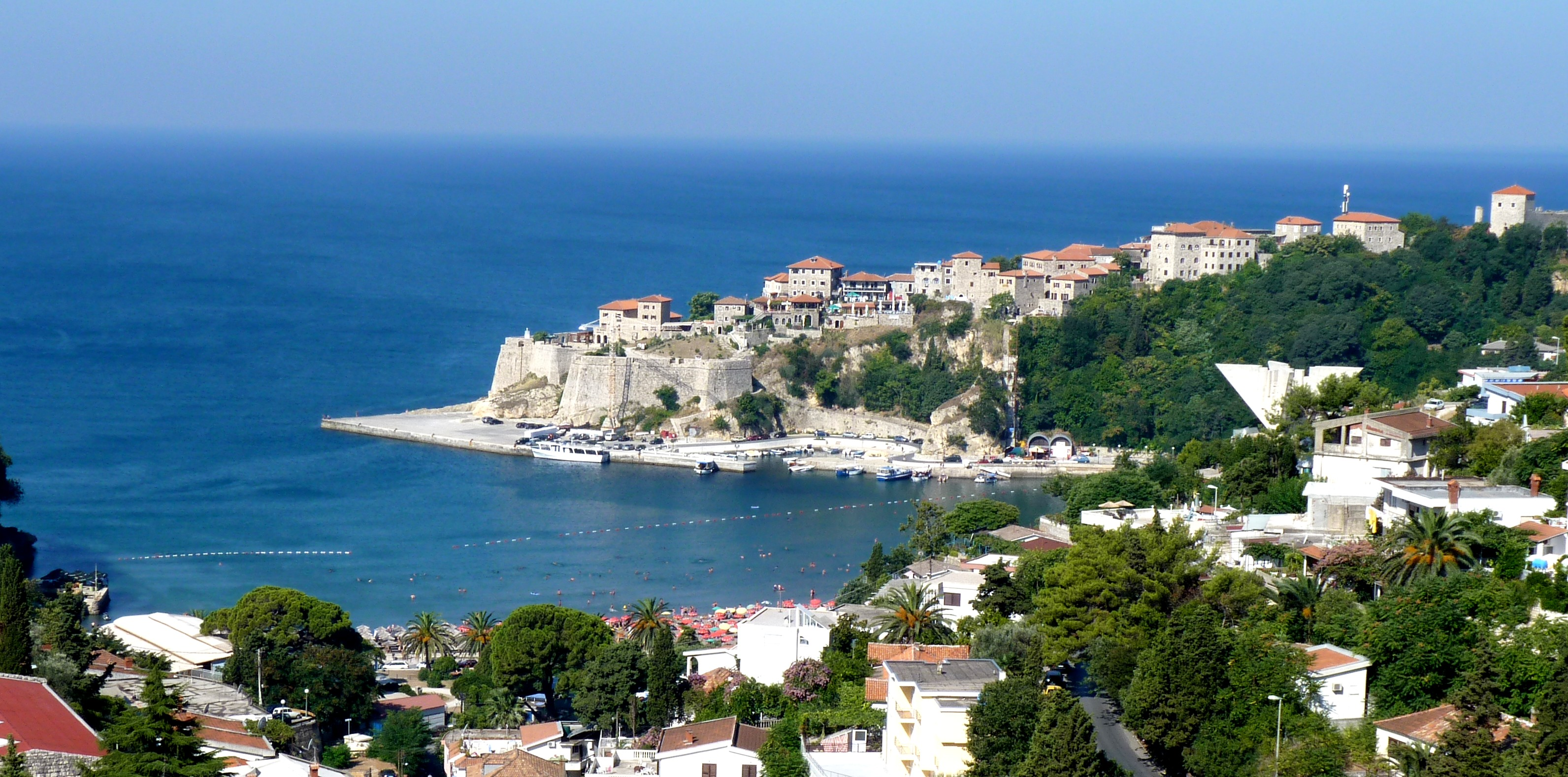
- Castle of Ulcinj

Site information
- Type: Castle
- Owner: Ulcinj Municipality, Private owners
- Open to the public: Yes

Location
- Coordinates: 41.923834°N 19.201355°E

Site history
- Built by: Illyrians and Greeks
- In use: Historical site, Private properties
- Materials: Stone
- Events: Skena verore, Panairi i Librit

The Ulcinj Castle (Montenegrin Cyrillic: Калjаја; Albanian: Kalaja e Ulqinit) or Ulcinj Old Town (Montenegrin Cyrillic: Стари град Улцињ / Stari grad Ulcinj; Albanian: Qyteti i vjetër i Ulqinit) is an ancient castle and neighborhood in Ulcinj, Montenegro. Today it is mostly inhabited by Albanians, it was built by the Illyrians on a small peninsula at the right side of the Pristan Gulf, which is part of the Adriatic Sea. Today, oldest remains are the Cyclopean Wall. The castle has been restored many times since it was first built although major changes were made by the Byzantines, Serbs, Venetians, and Ottomans. The modern city of Ulcinj was built outside of this castle.

== Characteristics ==
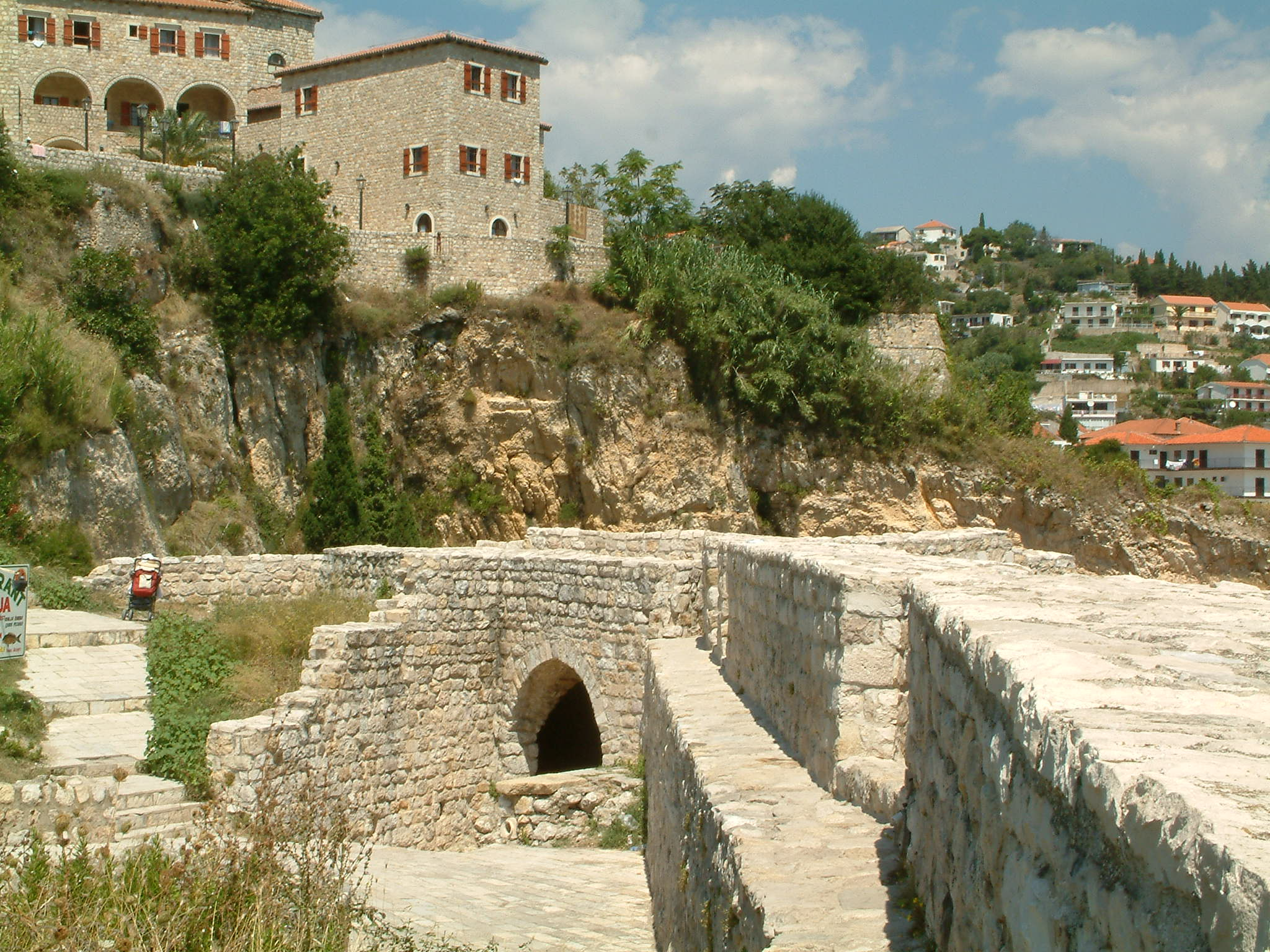
Ulcinj Castle

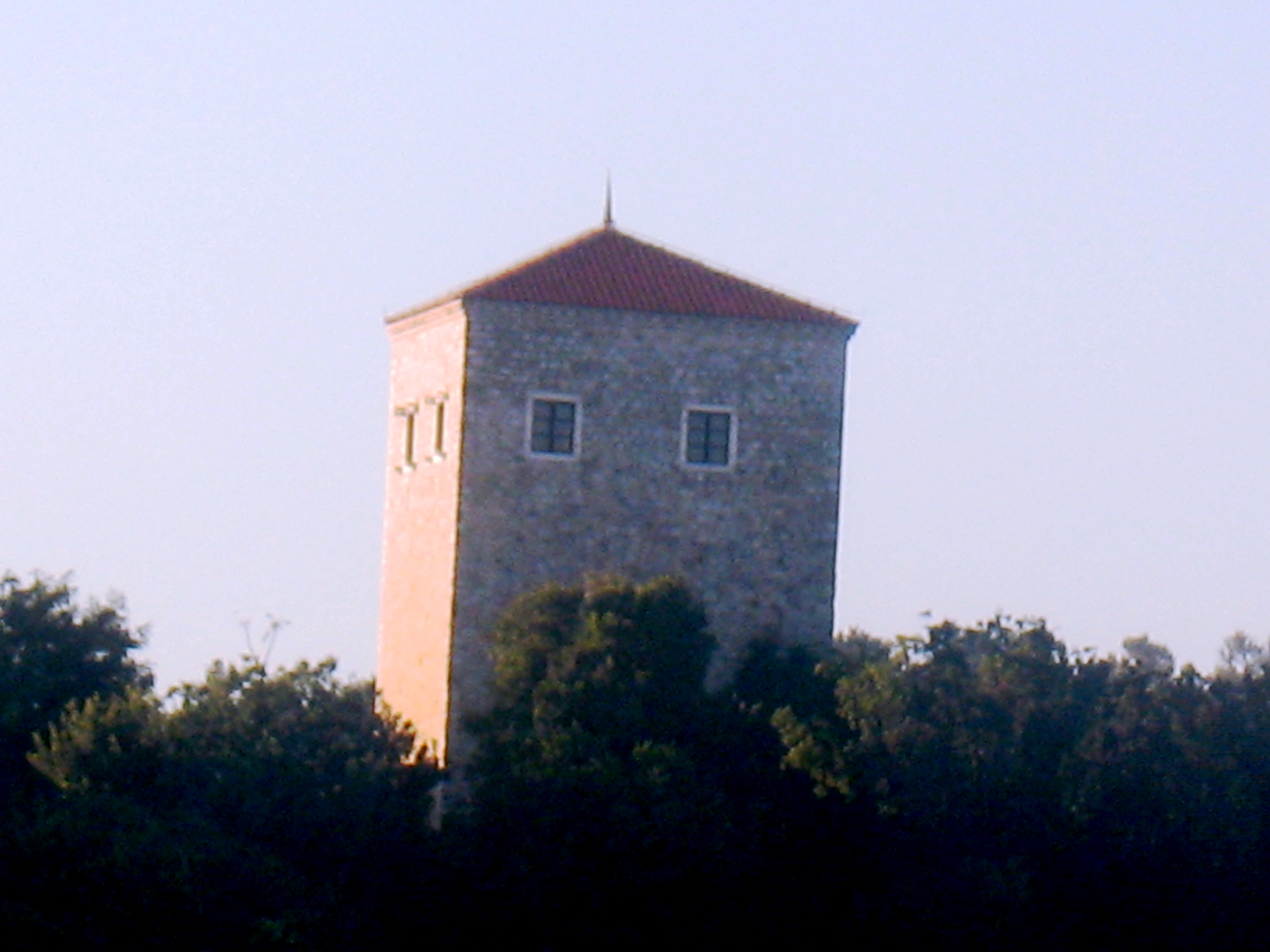
The Tower of Ballshaj/Balšić.

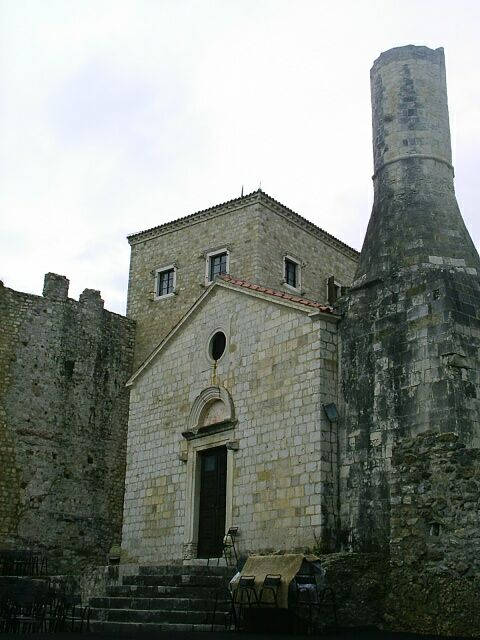
Church-Mosque

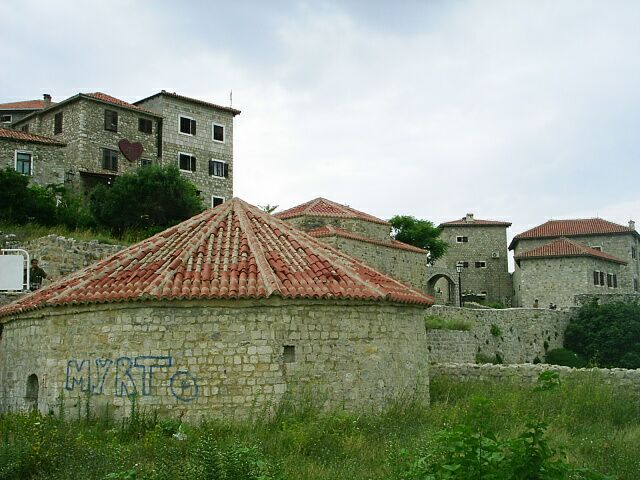
Weapon storage

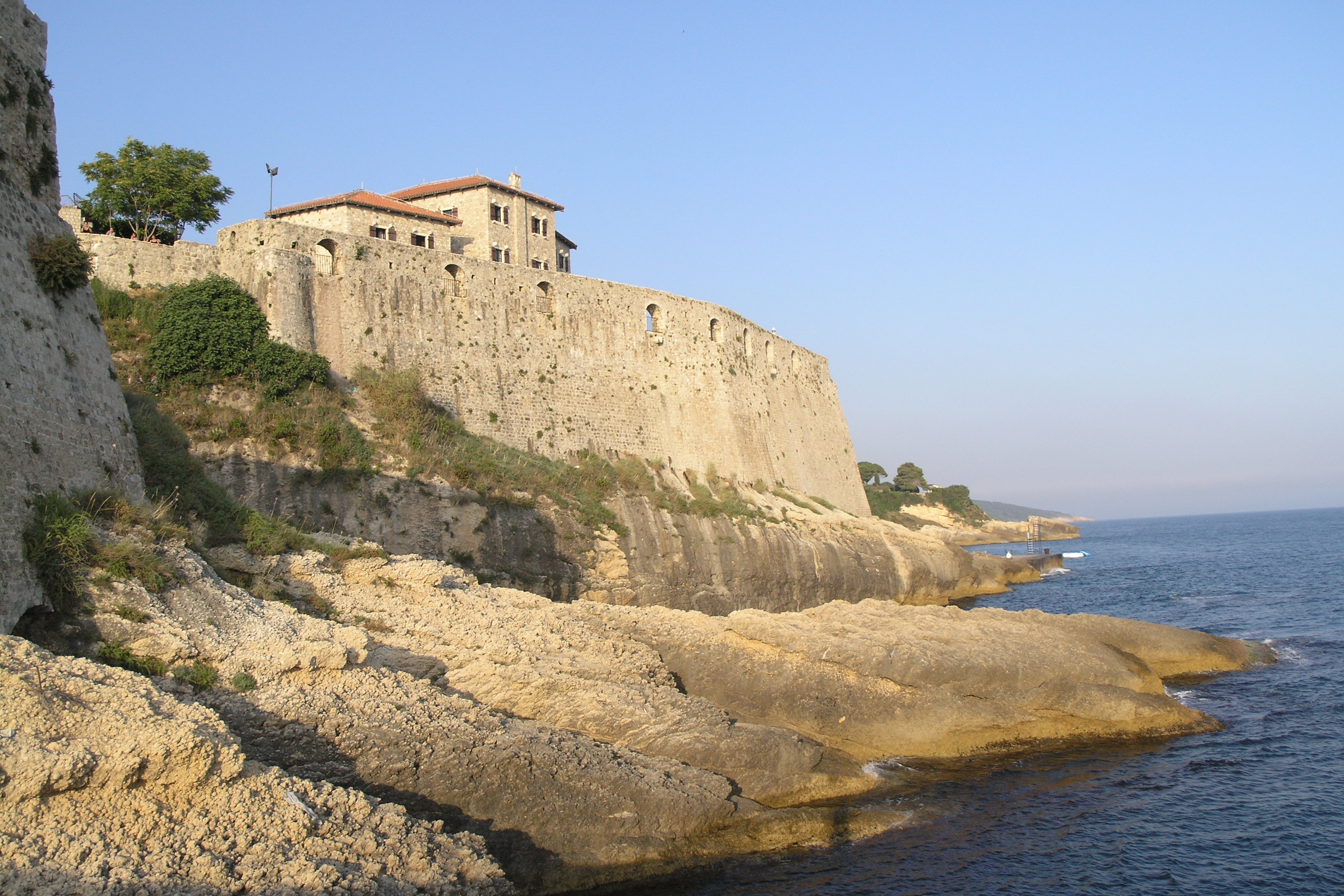
Castle walls

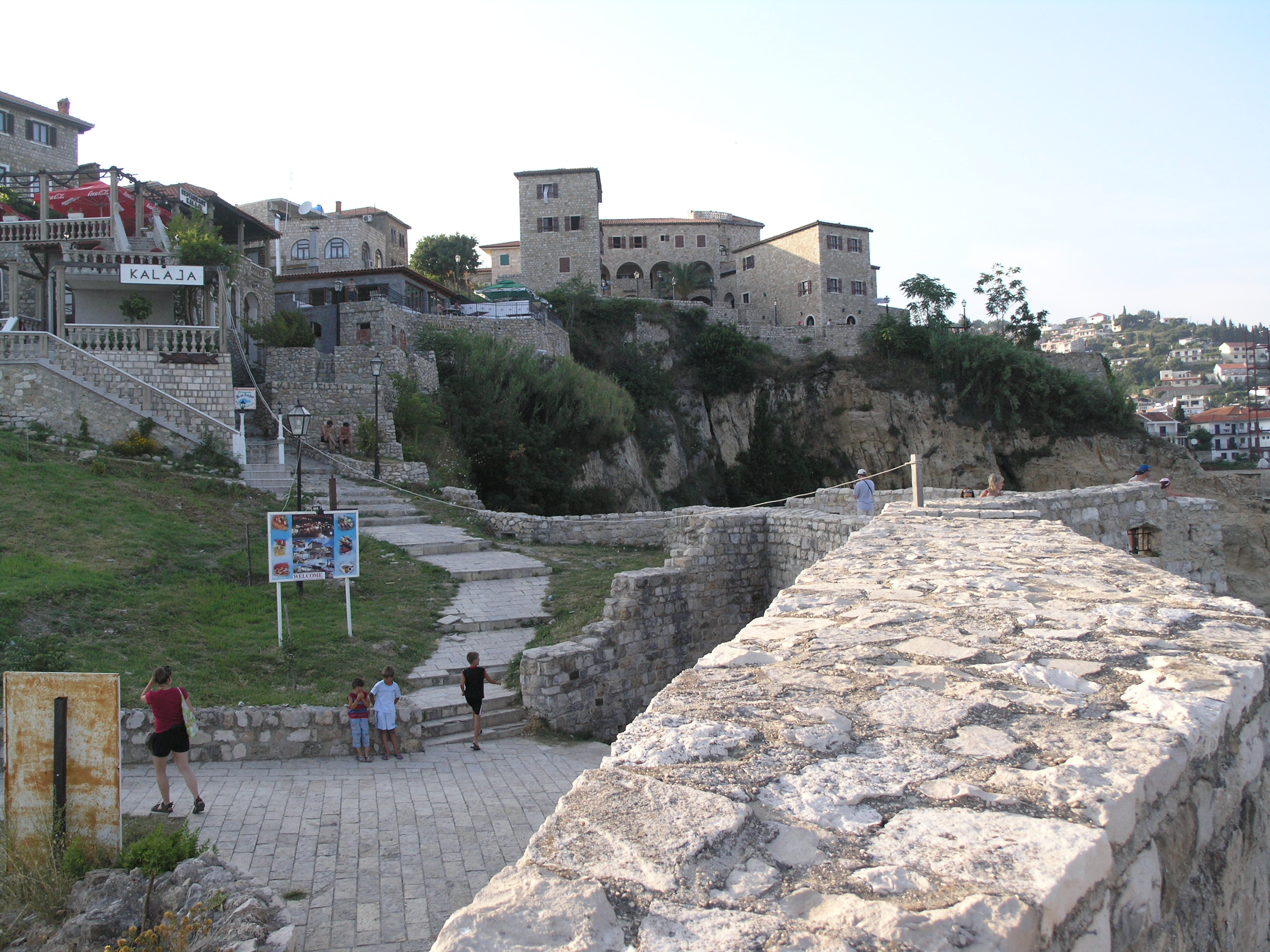
Old Town as seen from south

Ulcinj's Old Town' is one of the oldest urban architectural complexes on the Adriatic Sea. The castle, which some believe resembles a stranded ship, and the surrounding areas have flourished for about 25 centuries. Through the centuries, a variety of cultures and civilizations melded together. The Old Town represents a cultural and historical monument of invaluable significance due to its Illyrian walls, its citadel, the network of streets, the markets and town squares. It was built 2,500 years ago under economic, military, and cultural conditions quite different from those of today. The town's walls were often destroyed in wars, and just as quickly rebuilt by residents to keep their fortresses and residences safe. In doing so, they also preserved the beauty of this ancient town.

Old town has picturesque narrow and curved streets typical of the Middle Ages, densely packed two- and three-story stone houses decorated with elements of the Renaissance and Baroque, and finally a series of valuable edifices from the Ottoman time. The oldest remnants of the walls date back to the Illyrian period. In the 6th century, the town had two gates: the lower (eastern), which can be reached from the sea-side and the upper (western), which can be reached from land.

== The Tower of the Balšić ==
The Tower of the Balšić, (Serbian Cyrillic: Кула Балшића, Albanian: Kulla e Ballshajve) located on the upper, highest level is a citadel-fortress with a tower that dominates the old town and the surrounding countryside. It is connected to the last representatives of the Balšić dynasty, a wealthy family from the Shkodër area (today Albania, in that time Zeta), who had made Ulcinj their residence by the end of the 14th and beginning of the 15th centuries. Later the Ottomans built the third floor of the Balšić Tower as well as the spherical dome on the ground floor. This magnificent edifice has a view of the sea from three sides. It is considered to be one of the most representative edifices of medieval architecture in Montenegro. These days, it is used as a gallery or a location for organizing poets' nights.

== The Palace and the Court ==
It is believed that the castle was the residence of the Venetian administrator for Ulcinj in the Venice Palace. Because of its beauty and convenience, subsequent rulers also used this building as their court. During Ottoman occupation of the town, these edifices were used as residence of the local ruler. Not far away from the Palace of Venice, on the southern level of the Old Town, is a beautiful edifice called Kulla e Balshajve. Kulla e Balshajve has a square structure called Fusha Qehajes. Qehaja comes from the Turkish word "Çehaja" which is a military rank. Both of these edifices are used now as luxury accommodation for visitors to Ulcinj.

== The Town Market ==
In front of the Church-Mosque in the Old Town is a small square, that used to be town market (Albanian: Pazari Qytetit, Montenegrin: Gradska pijaca ), surrounded by arches. Ulcinj became a significant slave market from the middle of the 17th century. Most of the slaves in Ulcinj came from Italy and Dalmatia and were captured by Ulcinj pirates, who robbed people in the rich villas along the coast of Apulia and Sicily, captured them, and sold them as slaves. The Ulcinj pirates treated the slaves like convicts and did not use them for any kind of work. Instead they were kept as hostages while a ransom was demanded from their relatives, friends, or countrymen. They had to make it possible for the "slaves" to send messages to their homes or relatives so that they would come to offer the ransom. From the middle of the 18th century demand changed and the courtiers began to look for slaves from Africa. They would later have been sold again or brought to Ulcinj, where they might soon become free citizens and work in agriculture or seafaring. A small community of their descendants still live in Ulcinj.

== The Water Cults ==
There has always been a water cult in Ulcinj. It is believed that the image of Bindus, the Illyrian God of water and the sea, was carved into the walls of the Old Town. Many fountains were built not only for people's use, but also for the souls of the dead. Legend has it that it was better to build a fountain than a sacred building, thus, at one time, Ulcinj had more than thirty fountains, only half of which remain today.

Fountains were built as endowments (vakf) by individuals. They were made of stone and decorated with an incised tarih ("date" in Turkish) – the year of construction. The fountains in Ulcinj decorate the town with their beauty. They were harmoniously adapted to the environment where they were built. The inscription contains the name of the benefactor who built the fountain, usually with a wish and message that those who would get the nafaka ("compassionate allowance" in Turkish) – a chance to take just a sip of water from it, say a prayer for him, and wish him a place in wonderful Jannah.

The fountain in the Old Town was built in 1749-50. Water was taken from 600 metres north-west of the fortress, near a place called Javor. At this place there were a number of reservoirs where rainwater was collected which would then be used by the citizens of the Old Town if there was a siege. Kroni i zanave – "fairy's water", located on the north-western side in the Valdanos grove is the fountain most frequently sung about in Ulcinj. There are a lot of stories and legends about this beneficial and marvellous water. In the Ulcinj olive groves there are ten more nicely made water springs: Begov, Mustafës, Doçinës, Salkikinës, the Sailor's etc.. In the pine wood is the famous Ladies Beach with its sulfur springs, which are supposedly an elixir for barren women.

Physicians from the former Yugoslavia used to recommend that children with asthma should walk in the Ulcinj Pine Wood in the morning and rinse their throats with sea water.
