= Ulcinj =

Town and municipality in Coastal Montenegro

Ulcinj Улцињ Ulqin
- Town and municipality
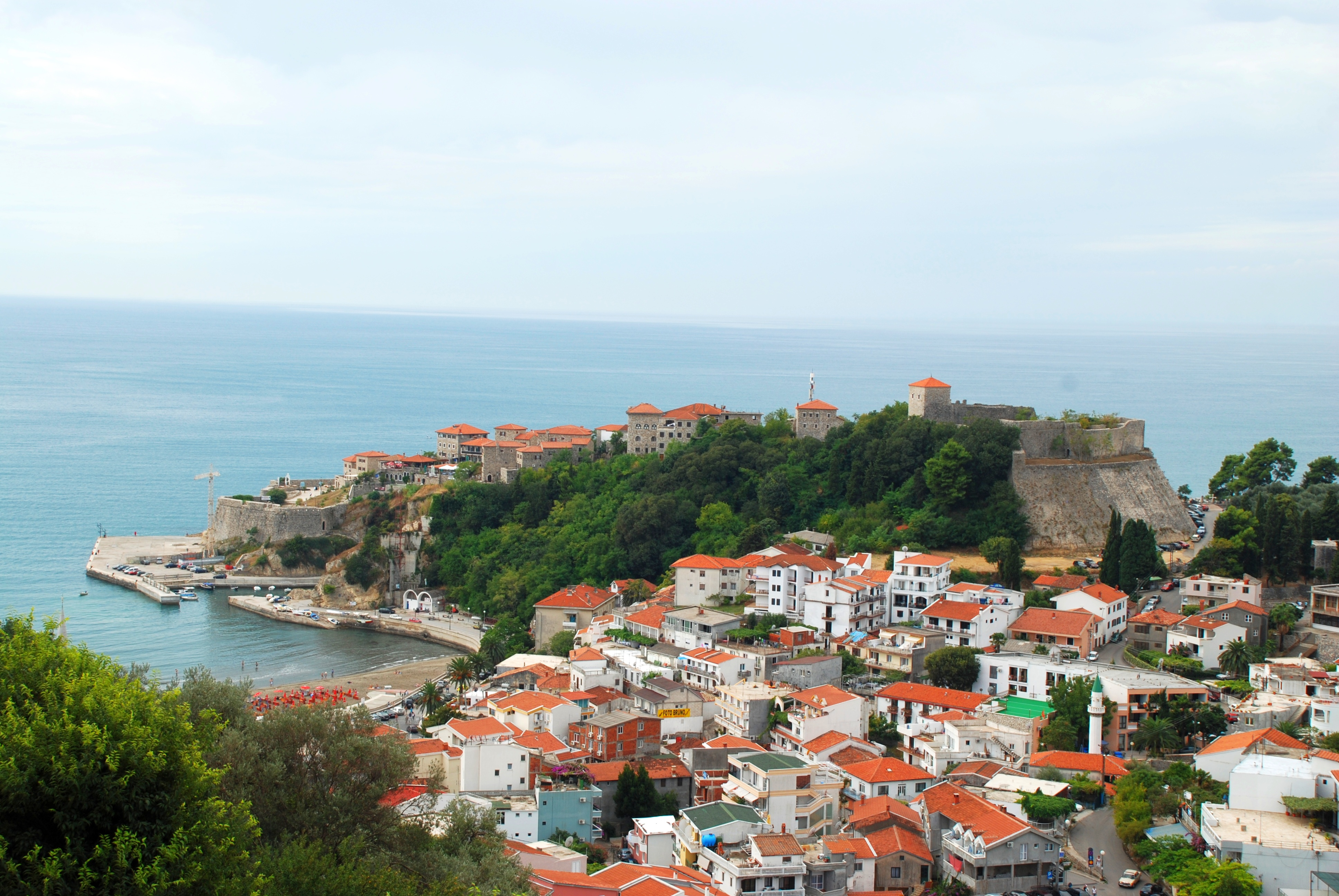
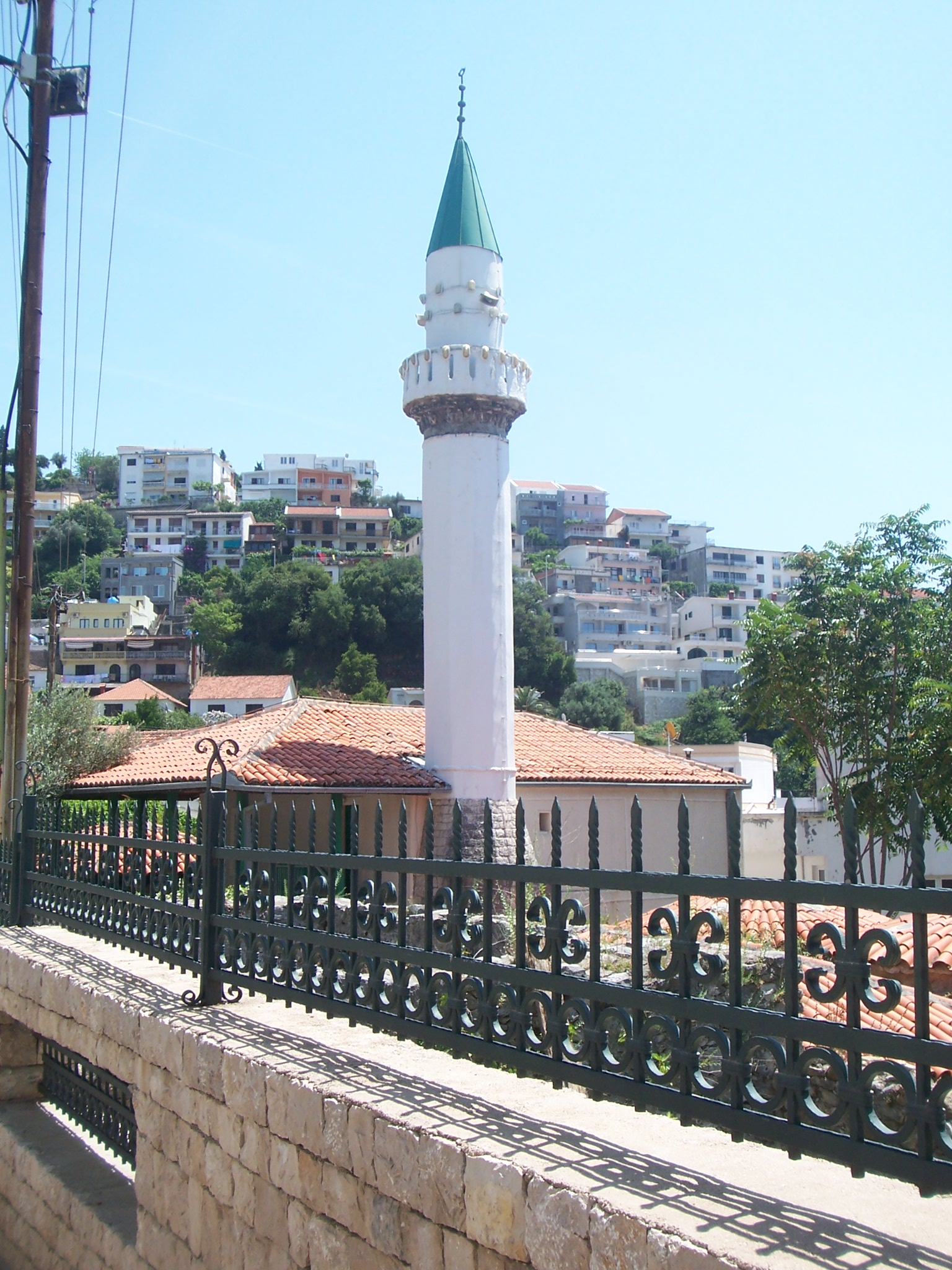
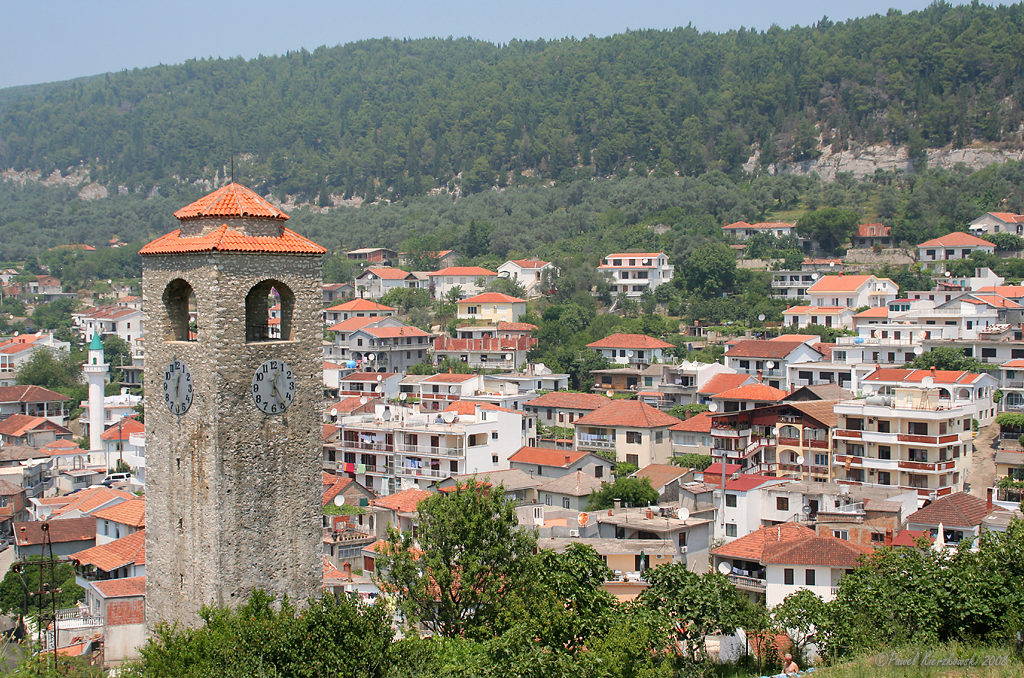
- View over Ulcinj The Pasha's Mosque The Clocktower

- Flag Coat of arms

- Location within Montenegro
- Coordinates: 41.92°N 19.20°E
- Country: Montenegro
- Region: Coastal
- Municipality: Ulcinj
- Established: 5th century BC
- Settlements: 39

Government
  - Type: Mayor-Assembly
  - Mayor: Genci Nimanbegu (FORCA)

Area
  - Town and municipality: 255 km^{2} (98 sq mi)

Population (2023 census)
  - Rank: 11th in Montenegro
  - Density: 79.47/km^{2} (205.8/sq mi)
  - Urban: 11,488 ▲
  - Rural: 9,907 ▲
  - Municipality: 21,395 ▲
- Demonym(s): Ulcinjani; Ulqinakë
- Time zone: UTC+1 (CET)
  - Summer (DST): UTC+2 (CEST)
- Postal code: 85360
- Area code: +382 30
- ISO 3166-2 code: ME-20
- Car plates: UL
- Website: Official Website

Ulcinj (Montenegrin Cyrillic: Улцињ, Albanian: Ulqin) is a town in the coastal region of Montenegro and the capital of Ulcinj Municipality. It has an urban population of 11,488.

As one of the oldest settlements in the Adriatic coast, it was founded in 5th century BC. It was captured by the Romans in 163 BC from the Illyrians. With the division of the Roman Empire, it was a part of the Byzantine Empire. In the Middle Ages, the Serbian Kingdom and the House of Balsha ruled Ulcinj until the Republic of Venice captured it in 1405 as part of Venetian Albania. It was known as a base for piracy. In 1571, Ulcinj was conquered by the Ottoman Empire with the aid of North African corsairs after the Battle of Lepanto. The town gradually became a Muslim-majority settlement. Under the Ottomans, numerous hammams and mosques, and a clock tower were built. Ulcinj remained a den of piracy until this was finally put to an end by Mehmed Pasha Bushati. Ulcinj remained an Ottoman town for more than 300 years until it was ceded to the Principality of Montenegro in 1878. During World War II, the coastal town was ceded to the Kingdom of Albania before later becoming part of Yugoslavia and, eventually, the modern state of Montenegro. It is a former medieval Catholic bishopric and remains a Latin titular see.

Ulcinj is a popular destination for tourists, because of its Long Beach, Lake Šas, Ada Bojana Island and for Ulcinj Castle, parts of which date back two millennia. There are 26 mosques in the town and surrounding countryside. Ulcinj is the centre of the Albanian community in Montenegro.

== Etymology ==
Early historian Livy (59 BC–AD 17) mentioned it, as did Pliny the Elder (23–79), who mentioned it as Olcinium, its old name Colchinium, "founded by [settlers from] Colchis" (Olchinium quod antea Colchinium dictum est a Colchis conditum). Ptolemy (90–168) mentions the city as Greek Oulkinion (Ουλκίνιον).

Although the ancient writers preferred a connection with Cholchis, the name of the settlement is connected with the Albanian word ujk or ulk (meaning wolf in English), from Proto-Albanian *(w)ulka, from Proto-Indo-European *wĺ̥kʷos.

In modern Albanian, it is known as Ulqin. The name, through Late (Vulgar) Roman, became Middle Latin Ulcinium, Italian: Dulcigno (pronounced [dulˈtʃiɲɲo]), and Dolchin, modern Italian Dulcigno Slavic: Ulcinj, Old Serbian: Льцин, Ульцин and Turkish: Ülgün.

== History ==
=== Antiquity ===
Ulcinj is an ancient seaport. The wider area of Ulcinj has been inhabited since the Bronze Age, based on dating of Illyrian tombs (tumuli) found in the village of Zogaj, in the vicinity of Ulcinj. The town is believed to have been founded in the 5th century BC by colonists from Colchis, as mentioned in the 3rd century BC poem by Apollonius of Rhodes. Illyrians lived in the region at the time as there are traces of immense Cyclopean walls still visible in the old Citadel.

All through the pre-medieval period, Ulcinj was known as a pirate capital of the Adriatic Sea. This is also seen during the later period of Illyrian Kingdom. From 20 BC to around 300 AD, the inhabitants of Ulcinj were known to be very confrontational towards foreigners they were especially concerned by border disputes.

=== Roman ===
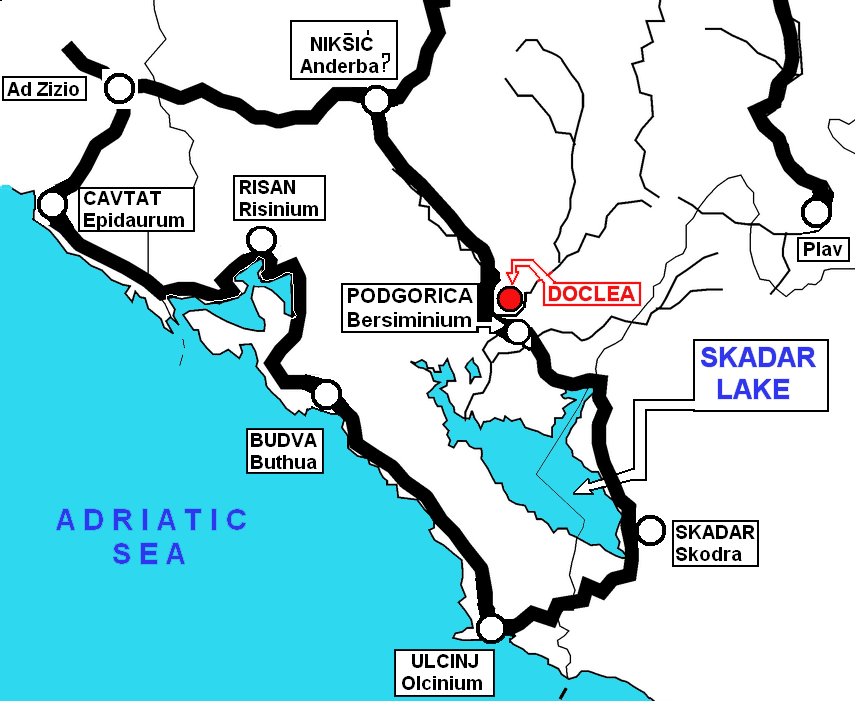
Roman Doclea

In 168 BC, during the Third Illyrian War, Olcinium broke with Gentius and defected to the Romans (Livy 45:26:2). Under Roman rule the town received the status of oppidum civium Romanorum (settlement of Roman citizens), only to be later granted municipium (independent town) status.

The Periplus Maris Erythraei names several Indian ports from where large ships sailed in an easterly direction to Khruse (Kruče - seaside village in Ulcinj).

From circa 820, the city was the see of a Diocese of Ulcinj, which was only suppressed in 1532, and would be revived as a Latin titular bishopric.

=== Medieval period ===
In the 9th century, it was in the Dyrrhachium theme, a military governorate of the Byzantine Empire. In 1010, Tsar Samuel of Bulgaria (r. 997-1014†) failed to conquer the town during the war against the Byzantines.

By 1040, archon Stefan Vojislav of Duklja conquered the region. In 1183, Serbian Prince Stefan Nemanja conquered Olcinium and the town prospered as one of the most significant coastal towns. Ulcinj remained in Nemanjić hands in their Kingdom and Empire, and after the death of Emperor Dušan (r. 1331-1355†), the region, known as Lower Zeta, was under the supervision of gospodin Žarko, a voivode of Emperor Uroš the Weak until his death in 1360. Žarko's lands were then held by the Balšić family. Under Balšić control, Ulcinj continued to be an important town and also minted coins.

=== Venetian and Ottoman rule ===
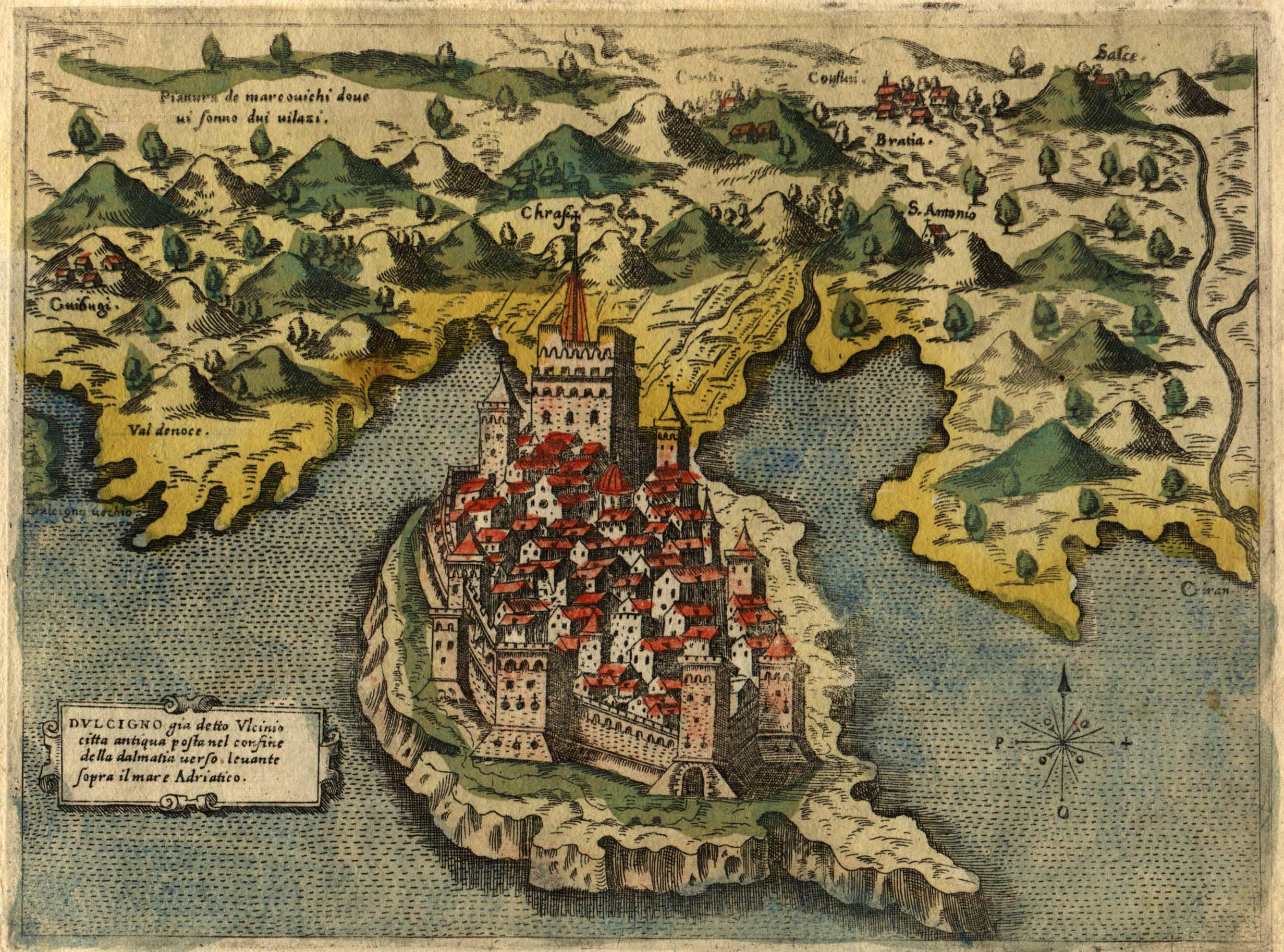
Map of Ülgün (named Dulcigno in the Italian-made map) in 1573 by Simon Pinargenti

According to historian Luigi Paulucci at the time of the Venetians the town was half Albanian, a quarter Venetian and one quarter Slavic.

In 1496 Arnold von Harff created a German-Albanian dictionary simply by interacting with the population of the city.

The Venetians attempted to capture the town twice, in 1696 and 1718, but were unsuccessful on both occasions.

During the 19th century, the town began to regain its position as a flourishing port. The geographer Antonio Baldacci reported a merchant marine of 500 ships plying the trade routes between the Adriatic and Mediterranean coasts.

In 1867, Ulcinj became a kaza of the İşkodra sanjak of Rumeli veyalet. After the Congress of Berlin in 1878, borders between Montenegro and the Ottoman Empire were redrawn, with Plav and Gusinje being ceded to Montenegro. But Muslim Albanian resistance prevented the Montenegrins from taking over Plav and Gusinje, so the Great Powers in 1880 decided to reverse the territorial transfer and offered Ulcinj, then also known as Dulcigno, to Montenegro as compensation. This led to a dispute between the Ottoman Empire and the Principality of Montenegro as the Ottoman Empire initially refused to recognize the treaty's provisions regarding Dulcigno. The Ottoman garrison in the town had been in place since the 16th century, but Montenegro claimed that the town and its surrounding territory were historically part of its territory.

In May 1880, the Great Powers (Britain, France, Germany, Austria-Hungary, Italy, and Russia) protested diplomatically and organized a naval demonstration off the coast of Dulcigno to put pressure on the Ottoman Empire to resolve the dispute peacefully. The Ottoman Empire eventually agreed to cede the town and surrounding territory to Montenegro in exchange for compensation.

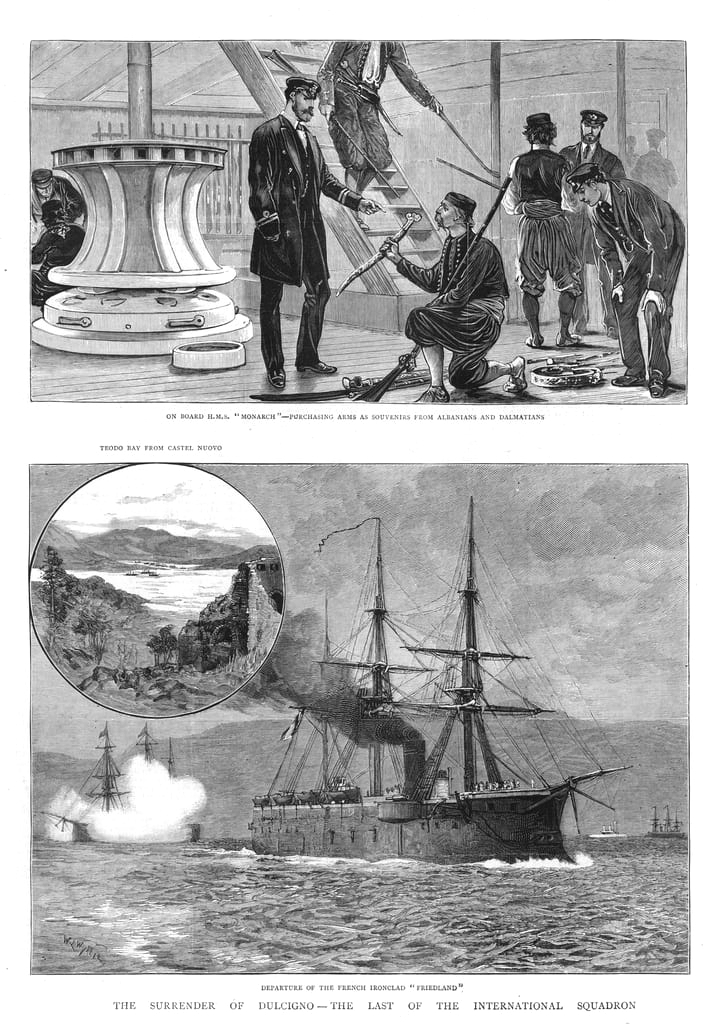
The Surrender of Dulcigno, the last of the International Squadron. The Graphic 1880

The surrender of Dulcigno to Montenegro marked a significant expansion of Montenegro's territory and was seen as a diplomatic victory for the Great Powers, who had prevented a potentially violent conflict in the region.

After the city's annexation to Montenegro, of its 8,000-strong population about 3,000 Albanians left and settled elsewhere in northern Albania. 142 Montenegrin families were brought to settle in the outskirts of Ulcinj in the 1880s. The population of Ulcinj steadily decreased until the post-WWII period.

=== 20th century to present ===
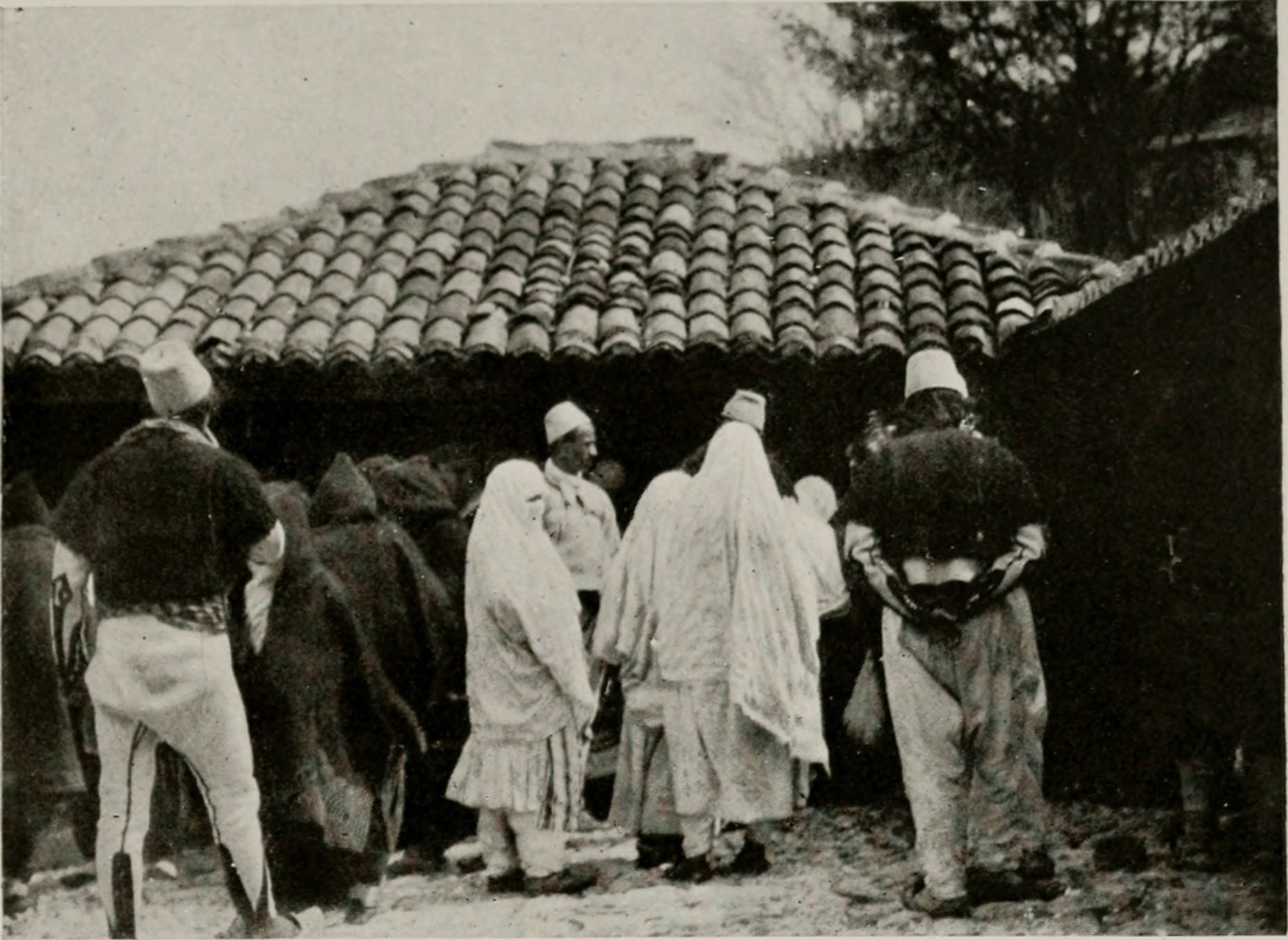
Ulcinj fish market in 1908

Ulcinj became a part of the Kingdom of Montenegro from 1878 until 1918 when Montenegro was absorbed into the Kingdom of Serbia for a short time before all would be incorporated into the first of the Yugoslav federations at the end of the year. Ulcinj remained within a Montenegrin entity whilst a South Slavic state had existed until 2006 when which it became part of an independent Montenegro following a referendum.

During the 20th century, Ulcinj survived heavy declines and new ascents. Ulcinj was the second biggest town of Montenegro when it joined the kingdom in 1880. In just three decades, it slid back to 6th place for economic development and number of inhabitants (after Podgorica, Niksic, Cetinje, Tivat and Plava). During World War I Ulcinj was conquered by Austria-Hungary in 1916 and Italy on November 4, 1918, and since 1920 it was part of the Serbo-Croatian-Slovenian Kingdom, later known as the Kingdom of Yugoslavia.

As the southernmost city of the coast of the Kingdom of Yugoslavia, Ulcinj had a strong turnaround in the 1930s with the development of the tourist industry. At that time hotels were built such as Krištja, Republic, Jadran and Koop (later Galeb). World War II halted economic momentum. From 1941 to 1944, Ulcinj was under the Albanian administration. On November 7, 1943, Ulcinj was bombarded by Allied forces, with over 46 people killed and many more injured. The Yugoslav Partisans took Ulcinj on November 26, 1944, and the city become part of Socialist Yugoslavia.

The 1950s and 1960s marked the greatest period of economic development for Ulcinj, with the construction of a range of modern hotels in the city and the Great Plain, as well as major economic collectives (NHT "Riviera of Ulcinj", "Agroulqini", Primary Building Company, "Otrantkomerc", "Ultep" and others). It demarcated the southernmost end of the Adriatic Highway ("magistrala"), also constructed in the 50s and 60s. In the catastrophic Montenegro earthquake on April 15, 1979, the city was severely damaged, but after only a few years, with the solidarity of the citizens of entire Yugoslavia, it was quickly renovated. Ulcinj at the end of the eighties had about 40 percent of the tourist turnover in Montenegro, while two-thirds of the guests were foreign, mostly German.

During the Kosovo War, in 1998 and 1999, thousands of Kosovo Albanians flocked to Ulcinj and its surroundings, where they were welcomed in the best possible conditions by the ethnic Albanian population of Ulcinj and the surrounding area.

== Geography ==
=== Neighbourhoods ===
- Çarshia (mn. Čaršija), is a neighbourhood and town centre which connects the old and new parts (neighbourhoods). In 2009 it was reconstructed, with the asphalt being changed into sett and the water and electrical system were changed. The neighbourhood has some 200 shops. There are two mosques located in this area, the Namazgjahu Mosque and Kryepazari Mosque.

=== Climate ===
Ulcinj has a Mediterranean climate (Csa) in the Köppen climate classification. Winters are cool and very rainy, and summers are hot and humid with possible afternoon thunder showers. Unlike Podgorica which is located inland, temperatures rarely exceed 35 °C (95 °F) and seldom drop below 0 °C (32 °F).

Climate data for Ulcinj (1991–2020 normals, extremes 1949–present)
Month	Jan	Feb	Mar	Apr	May	Jun	Jul	Aug	Sep	Oct	Nov	Dec	Year
Record high °C (°F)	19.6 (67.3)	26.7 (80.1)	26.8 (80.2)	31.7 (89.1)	33.9 (93.0)	37.6 (99.7)	41.1 (106.0)	41.0 (105.8)	36.0 (96.8)	32.6 (90.7)	27.9 (82.2)	20.7 (69.3)	41.1 (106.0)
Mean daily maximum °C (°F)	11.5 (52.7)	12.7 (54.9)	15.6 (60.1)	19.0 (66.2)	23.8 (74.8)	28.1 (82.6)	30.7 (87.3)	31.3 (88.3)	26.8 (80.2)	22.3 (72.1)	17.4 (63.3)	12.6 (54.7)	21.0 (69.8)
Mean daily minimum °C (°F)	3.6 (38.5)	4.4 (39.9)	6.7 (44.1)	9.6 (49.3)	13.7 (56.7)	17.6 (63.7)	19.5 (67.1)	20.1 (68.2)	16.6 (61.9)	13.0 (55.4)	9.0 (48.2)	4.7 (40.5)	11.5 (52.7)
Record low °C (°F)	−8.4 (16.9)	−8.3 (17.1)	−5 (23)	0.4 (32.7)	5.2 (41.4)	8.9 (48.0)	12.3 (54.1)	10.6 (51.1)	8.6 (47.5)	1.1 (34.0)	−2.2 (28.0)	−5.6 (21.9)	−8.4 (16.9)
Average precipitation mm (inches)	139.9 (5.51)	126.3 (4.97)	124.8 (4.91)	102.7 (4.04)	77.9 (3.07)	60.1 (2.37)	27.8 (1.09)	39.4 (1.55)	112.5 (4.43)	146.3 (5.76)	167.2 (6.58)	164.1 (6.46)	1,289 (50.75)
Average precipitation days (≥ 1 mm)	9.4	9.6	9.0	9.0	7.0	4.1	2.4	2.9	6.4	8.4	10.3	10.8	89.3
Average relative humidity (%)	66	64	66	70	71	69	62	63	66	67	69	67	67
Mean monthly sunshine hours	121.3	126.8	170.5	202.3	263.7	299.2	349.9	319.6	255.8	195.7	134.6	118.2	2,557.6
Source 1: National Oceanic and Atmospheric Administration
Source 2: Hydrological and Meteorological Service of Montenegro (humidity, sun 1961–1990)

== Demographics ==
Historical population
Year	Pop.	±%
1948	4,385	—
1953	4,919	+12.2%
1961	5,705	+16.0%
1971	7,459	+30.7%
1981	9,140	+22.5%
1991	11,144	+21.9%
2003	10,828	−2.8%
2011	10,707	−1.1%
2023	11,488	+7.3%
Source: pop-stat.mashke.org

Ulcinj is the administrative centre of Ulcinj Municipality, which has a population of 21,395. The town of Ulcinj itself has a population of 11,488. Ulcinj Municipality is the centre of the Albanian community in Montenegro. It is one of two municipalities in Montenegro where Albanians form the majority with 70%, the other being Tuzi with a 68% majority.

Population of Ulcinj (municipality) by gender
City	Population
Female	9,983(50.11%)
Male	9,938(49.89%)

Population of Ulcinj (town) by gender
City	Population
Female	5,441(50.82%)
Male	5,266(49.18%)

=== Ethnicity, language and religion ===
The majority ethnic group in Ulcinj are Albanians. The largest spoken language is Albanian.

Population by ethnicity (2011 census):

Population of Ulcinj (municipality) by ethnicity
Albanians	70.66%
Montenegrins	12.44%
Bosniaks	6.12%
Serbs	5.75%
Roma/Egyptians	1.17%
other	3.86%

Population of Ulcinj (town) by ethnicity
Albanians	60.89%
Montenegrins	17.07%
Serbs	8.54%
Bosniaks	7.30%
Roma/Egyptians	2.12%
other	4.08%

Population by ethnicity (2023 census):

Population of Ulcinj (municipality) by ethnicity
Albanians	73.66%
Montenegrins	11.9%
Serbs	5.01%
Bosniaks	3.89%
Roma/Egyptians	1.27%
other	4.27%

Population of Ulcinj (town) by ethnicity
Albanians	66.85%
Montenegrins	15.84%
Serbs	7.17%
Bosniaks	3.31%
Roma/Egyptians	2.06%
other	4.77%

Population by mother tongue (2011 census):

Population of Ulcinj (municipality) by mother tongue
Albanian	72.04%
Serbian	11.97%
Montenegrin	10.73%
Bosnian	1.04%
other	4.22%

Population of Ulcinj (town) by mother tongue
Albanian	62.29%
Serbian	18.18%
Montenegrin	13.73%
Bosnian	1.19%
other	4.61%

Population by mother tongue (2023 census):

Population of Ulcinj (municipality) by mother tongue
Albanian	74.44%
Montenegrin	11.73%
Serbian	8.34%
Bosnian	2.62%
other	2.87%

Population of Ulcinj (town) by mother tongue
Albanian	67.38%
Montenegrin	14.54%
Serbian	12.06%
Bosnian	2.43%
other	3.59%

Population by religion (2011 census):

Population of Ulcinj (municipality) by religion
Muslims	71.82%
Orthodox	14.88%
Catholics	11.02%
other	2.28%

Population of Ulcinj (town) by religion
Muslims	68.15%
Orthodox	22.65%
Catholics	6.45%
other	2.75%

Population by religion (2023 census):

Population of Ulcinj (municipality) by religion
Muslims	76.89%
Orthodox	11.53%
Catholics	9.83%
other	1.75%

Population of Ulcinj (town) by religion
Muslims	75.05%
Orthodox	16.99%
Catholics	5.86%
other	2.1%

== Tourism ==
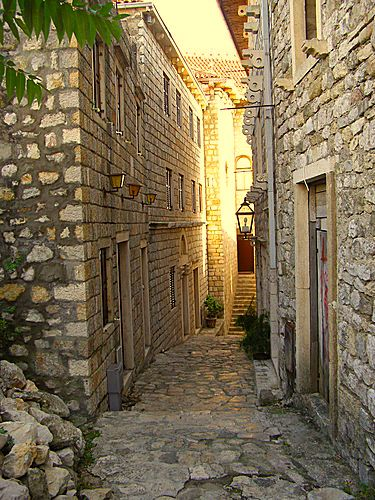
The old town of Ulcinj

Ulcinj is a tourist destination in summer. In January 2010, the New York Times named ranked the south coast region of Montenegro, featuring Velika Plaza, Ada Bojana, and the Hotel Mediteran, as one of "The Top 31 Places to Go in 2010".

Although Ulcinj is still undiscovered by many travelers from larger countries, repeat tourists and an increasing number of first-time visitors make it a hot spot for vacationers between the months of May and September. It is most famous for its sandy beaches. The most valuable resource of the Ulcinj riviera is Velika plaža (Albanian: Plazha e Madhe, lit. 'The Big Beach'), which is a 12 km (7.5 mi) long stretch of sandy beach and the longest beach on the Montenegrin coast. There is a small pebble beach called Ladies Beach which folk tradition holds to have qualities conducive to fertility.

There is also a beach called Mala Plaža (Albanian: Plazhi i Vogël, lit. 'Small Beach') which is much smaller in size, but is located in the centre of town and very popular with visitors. "The Korzo", as it is called by locals, is a promenade which separates a street lined with coffee shops from Mala plaža. At night during the summer months, the Korzo is pedestrianised and families and young people gather. There are many more less known smaller beaches that serve as get-aways from the main tourist areas. Ulcinj has also a large number of religious buildings like mosques, türbes and churches, including Pasha's Mosque, Sailors' Mosque and St. Nicholas' Church.

Ulcinj's old town is a well preserved citadel surviving from medieval times. The old town sits atop a rocky bluff overlooking the shore and is being rapidly restored as a tourist centre. Ada Bojana is popular among foreign tourists from Western Europe for its peace and atmosphere. A large naturist campsite is located in Ada Bojana. Lake Šas and Ulcinj's salt pond are visited by birdwatchers, because Ulcinj and its surroundings are major resting points for over 200 bird species on their migration paths. There are numerous cafés, discos, and bars that dot the city that are usually filled to capacity throughout the summer. The majority of tourists that visit Ulcinj are Albanians, Serbians, Croatians, Bosnians, Slovenians, Macedonians, Russians, Ukrainians, and other Europeans.

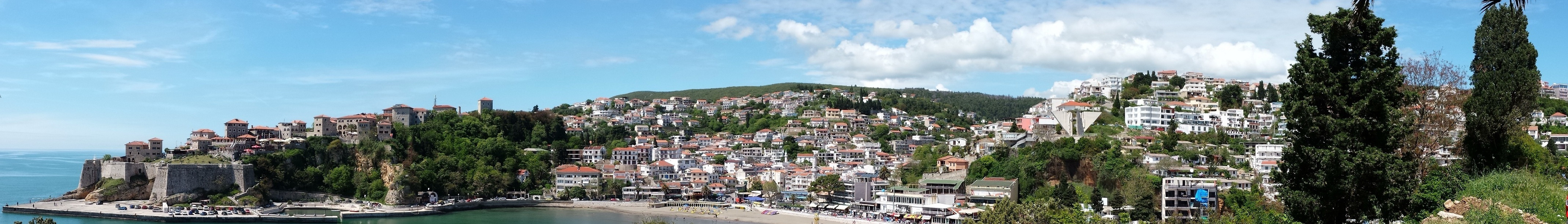
Ulcinj Panorama

== Education ==
Montenegrin name	Albanian name	Location	Language(s)
Elementary schools
Osnovna škola "Boško Strugar"	Shkolla Fillore "Boshko Strugar"	Ulcinj	Montenegrin & Albanian
Osnovna škola "Maršal Tito"	Shkolla Fillore "Marshal Tito"	Ulcinj	Montenegrin & Albanian
Osnovna škola "Bedri Elezaga"	Shkolla Fillore "Bedri Elezaga"	Vladimir	Albanian
Osnovna škola "Marko Nuculović"	Shkolla Fillore "Mark Nuculloviq"	Donji Štoj	Montenegrin & Albanian
High schools
Srednja mješovita škola "Bratstvo i jedinstvo"	Shkolla e Mesme e Kombinuar "Vëllazërim Bashkim"	Ulcinj	Montenegrin & Albanian
Gimnazija "Drita"	Gjimnazi "Drita"	Ulcinj	Albanian

== Sports and recreation ==
Ulcinj's southern coast is well known for its active sports, recreation possibilities and hunting. Kitesurfing at Ada Bojana, all manner of water sports at Velika plaža, scuba diving among wrecks and sunken cities, mountain biking, hiking, orienteering, cycling through the olive groves at Valdanos, long walks along the pristine beaches of the south coast of Montenegro, even deep sea fishing on the Adriatic, lake fishing at Lake Skadar, and river fishing in Ada Bojana, Due to the fact that the favorable habitat for wild life, has excellent conditions of hunting tourism. This place is the haven of ornithological (gourmand) hunting in Reč and Shenkol most common wildlife are woodcock, hare, wild boar, and ducks.

List of sport clubs in Ulcinj:

Name		Sport	Competing	Founded
Montenegrin name	Albanian name	Sport	Competing	Founded
Fudbalski klub "Otrant-Olympic"	Klubi Fudbolistik "Otrant-Olympic"	Football	Montenegrin Second League	1921
Košarkaški klub "Ulcinj"	Klubi i Basketbollit "Ulcinj"	Basketball	Montenegrin Basketball League	1976
RK Ulcinj	Klubi i Hendbollit "Ulcinj"	Handball	Montenegrin First League of Men's Handball	
Teniski klub "Bellevue"	Klubi i Tenisit "Bellevue"	Tennis		2009
Omladinski fudbalski klub "Federal"	Klubi Futbolistik Rinor "Federall"	Football	South Region League	2007
Karate klub "Champions"	Klubi i Karates "Champions"	Karate		
Karate Klub "Ulcinj"	Klubi i Karates "Ulqini"	Karate		
Stonoteniski Klub "Valdanos"	Klubi i Ping Pongut "Valdanos"	Table Tennis	Cadet, Junior, Senior Montenegrin League	2012

== Transport ==
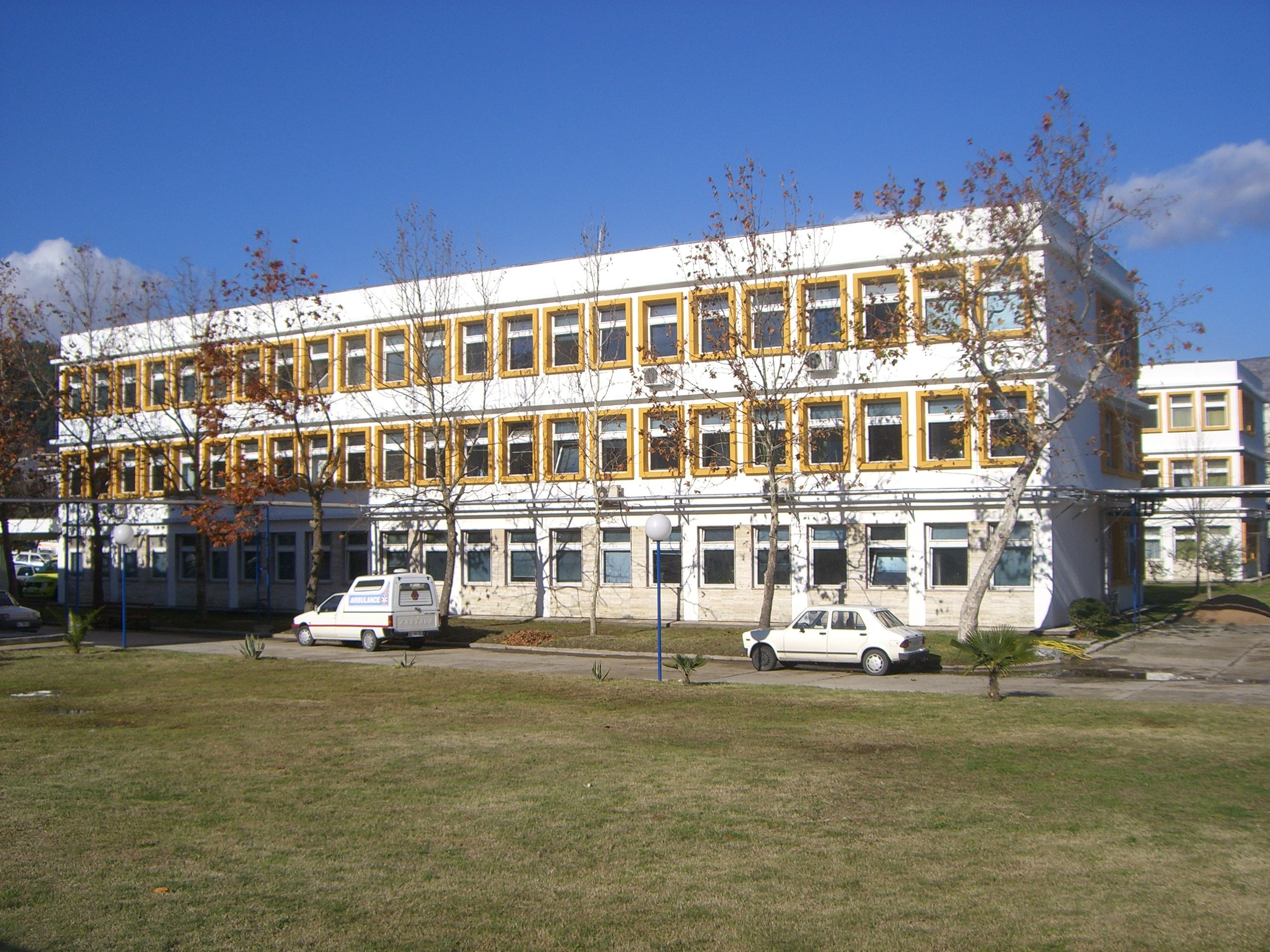
Community Health Centre in Ulcinj

Ulcinj is connected with the rest of Montenegro by a two-lane highway. It is connected with other coastal towns by the Adriatic Highway. Reaching inland is made possible by detouring from the Adriatic Highway at Budva or Sutomore (through the Sozina Tunnel).

Plans have been floated for the construction of an international airport to serve Ulcinj, with leisure conglomerate TUI expressing interest, however Ulcinj currently only has a small airfield with a 760 m grass runway. Nearby airports in Tivat and Podgorica are both around 70 km (43 mi) away. There are regular flights to Belgrade and Zürich from Tivat. Podgorica Airport has regular flights to major European destinations throughout the year. Many tourists traveling to Ulcinj from abroad arrive to the city from the airport in Tivat due to its recent renovations and general ease of navigation. There are also intercity buses that connect to other towns in the country and buses that go to Serbia, Albania, Kosovo, North Macedonia, Greece, and Germany (during tourist seasons) as well Flixbus operates in this area connecting to Shkoder and Tirana at the moment.

== International relations ==
Ulcinj is a founding member of the Union of Albanian Municipalities in the Region. Ulcinj is twinned with:

- Berat, Albania
- Deçan, Kosovo
- Liesing (Vienna), Austria
- Lukavac, Bosnia and Herzegovina
- Serik, Turkey
- Stari Grad (Sarajevo), Bosnia and Herzegovina
- (United States) Staten Island, USA
- Uzhhorod, Ukraine

=== Cooperation and friendship ===
Ulcinj also cooperates with:

- Durrës, Albania

== Notable people ==
- Đurađ II Balšić, Lord of Zeta from 1385 to 1403, member of the Balšić noble family.
- Dritan Abazović, Prime Minister of Montenegro
- Jelena Balšić, daughter of Lazar of Serbia, author of Gorički zbornik, first woman writer in South Slavs
- Gjon Buzuku, Catholic priest who wrote the first known printed book in Albanian
- Cafo Beg Ulqini, First Albanian born Mayor of the Ulcinj Municipality, Regent of the Albanian Kingdom, Leader of Second League of Prizren and Knight of the Order of Skanderbeg
- Pjetër Gjoka, actor and People's Artist of Albania
- Rizo Šurla, photographer, and actor of African descent
- John VIII or Giovanni Bruni, archbishop of Bar (1551–1571)
- Adrian Lulgjuraj, Montenegrin-Albanian singer
- Alex Rudaj, Albanian-American mobster
- Lika Ceni, Captain and Pirate Commander
- Rade Tovladijac, Serbian comic book artist
- Mark Gjonaj, Albanian-American politician
- Mujo Ulqinaku, Albanian officer and a People's Hero of Albania
- Sabbatai Zevi, İzmir born mystic, founder of the Jewish Sabbatean movement
- Andrej Nikolaidis, writer
- Božidar Đurašković, athlete
- Vladimir Mihailović, basketball player
- Gazmend Çitaku is an Albanian Montenegrin photographer, publisher, and librarian
- Miodrag Bata Kostić, Serbian musician
