= Clock Tower =

A clock tower is an architectural structure housing a turret clock.

Clock Tower may also refer to:

== Buildings ==
=== England ===
- Clock Tower (Westminster), the former name of the tower containing the Big Ben
- Clock Tower, Brighton, East Sussex
- Clock Tower, Herne Bay, Kent
- Clock Tower, St Albans, Hertfordshire

=== India ===
- Clock Tower, Anantapur, Andhra Pradesh
- Clock Tower, Erode, Tamil Nadu
- Clock Tower of Haridwar, Uttarakhand
- Clock Tower of Murshidabad, West Bengal

=== Pakistan ===
- Clock Tower, Faisalabad, Punjab
- Clock Tower, Sialkot, Punjab

=== Elsewhere ===
- The Clock Towers, Mecca, Saudi Arabia
- Clock Tower of Ateca, Spain
- Clock Tower, Hong Kong
- Clock Tower (Iquique), Chile
- Korçë Clock Tower, Albania
- Clock Tower (Podgorica), Montenegro
- Clock Tower of Guayaquil, Ecuador
- Clock Tower (Rome, Georgia), US
- Tirana Clock Tower, Albania
- Clock Tower of Ulcinj, Montenegro
- Deira Clocktower, Dubai, UAE

== Video games ==
- Clock Tower (series), a horror adventure video game series
  - Clock Tower (1995 video game), the first game in the series, released on the Super Famicom
  - Clock Tower (1996 video game), the second game in the series, released on the PlayStation

== Other uses ==
- The Clocktower (restaurant), a restaurant in New York City, US

== See also ==
- List of clock towers
- Ghanta Ghar (disambiguation) (lit. 'Clock Tower' in Indic languages)
- Big Ben (disambiguation)
- Clock Tower Square, in Thimphu, Bhutan
- Turret clock
