= Big Ben (disambiguation) =

Big Ben is a bell in Elizabeth Tower which is part of the Palace of Westminster in London, England.

Big Ben or Bigben may also refer to:

== People with the nickname ==
- Ben Bishop (born 1986), American ice hockey goaltender
- Ben Bowen (2002–2005), American cancer patient
- Ben Caunt (1815–1861), English bare-knuckle boxer who became the "heavyweight" boxing champion known as the "Torkard Giant" and "Big Ben"
- Ben Johnson (Canadian sprinter) (born 1961), Jamaican-Canadian sprinter
- Ben Maller (born 1975), American national sports radio host
- Ben Roethlisberger (born 1982), former American football quarterback for the Pittsburgh Steelers
- Ben Wallace (basketball) (born 1974), American retired basketball player
- Ben Davis (born 1977), American sports media personality and retired baseball player

== Fictional characters ==
- Big Ben (comics), a British superhero
- Big Ben (G.I. Joe), in the G.I. Joe universe
- Big Ben the Clockwork Whale, in Rudolph's Shiny New Year and Rudolph and Frosty's Christmas in July
- Big Ben, French name of Cogsworth in Beauty and the Beast (1991 film)

== Other uses ==
- Big Ben (album), a 1965 album by Jorge Ben
- Big Ben (Derain), a 1906 painting by André Derain
- Big Ben (horse, foaled 1976), a Canadian show jumping horse
- Big Ben (horse, foaled 1987), an Indonesian racehorse
- Big Ben (locomotive), a steam locomotive used in Australia
- Big Ben (card game), a patience or card solitaire game
- Big Ben (Heard Island), a volcanic massif in the southern Indian Ocean
- Bigben (computer), a Cray supercomputer
- Bigben Interactive, a video game company
- Project Big Ben, a British Second World War operation to reconstruct and evaluate captured missiles
- Big Ben, a model of alarm clock manufactured by Westclox
- "Big Ben", a song by Frock Destroyers from the 2020 album Frock4Life
- "Big Ben", a song by Jay Chou from the 2012 album Opus 12

== See also ==
- Big Ben Aden, a clock tower in Aden, Yemen
- Big Ben Bowen Highway or West Virginia Route 193
- Big Ben of Murshidabad or Clock Tower of Murshidabad
- Big Bend (disambiguation)
