= Tower Square =

Tower Square may refer to:

- Tower Square (Atlanta)
- Tower Square (Springfield, Massachusetts)

== Others ==
- Clock Tower Square, in Thimphu, Bhutan
- Martyrs' Square, Beirut, formerly Sahat al-Burj (Tower Square)
- Travelers Tower, formerly One Tower Square
