= House of Luzárraga =

Spanish house of nobility

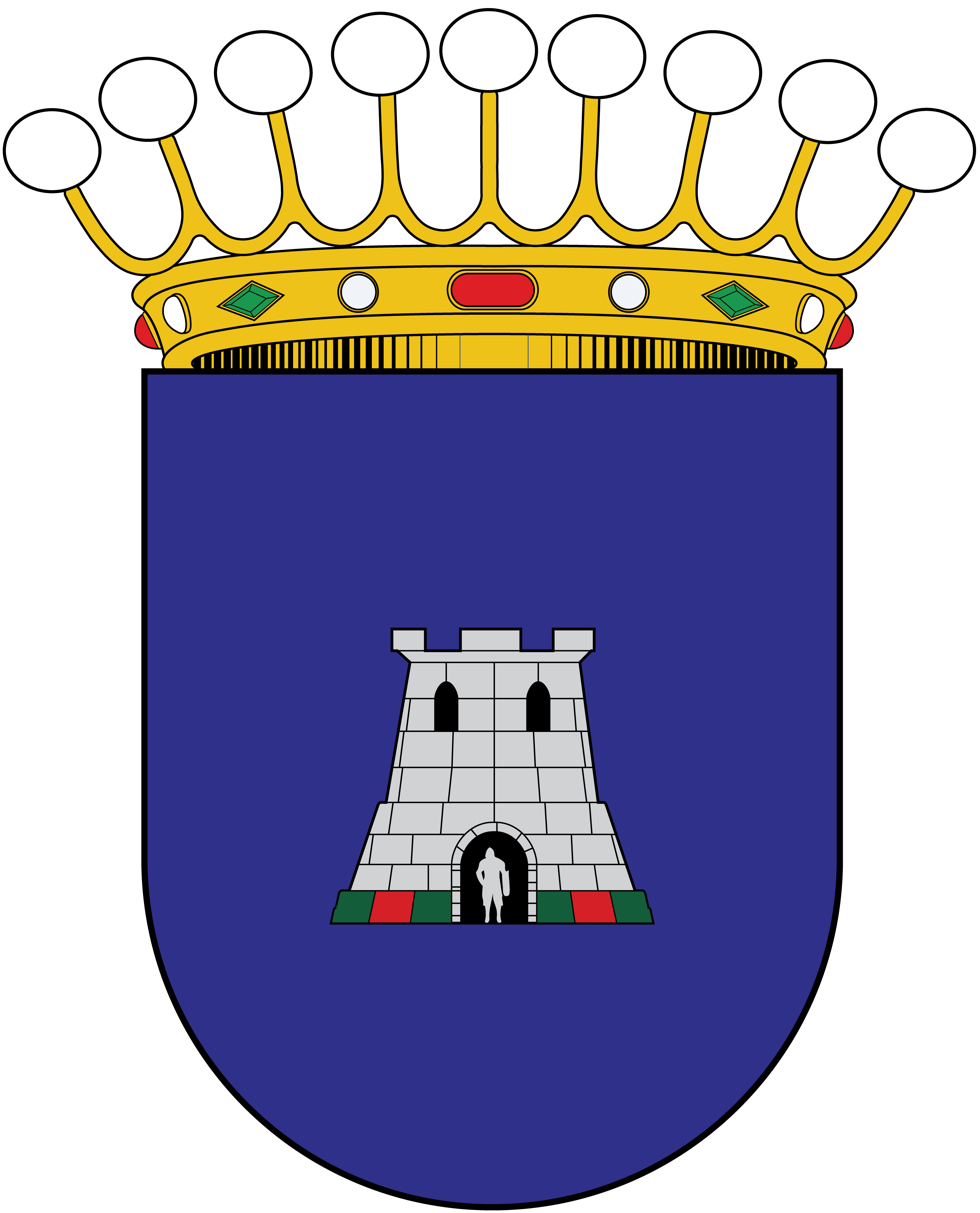
Family crest of the House of Luzárraga

The House of Luzárraga is a Spanish house of nobility whose origins date back to Basque-Navarrian nobility, and source its name to the progenitor of its most famous member, Admiral Manuel Antonio de Luzárraga y Echezuria, who would later become the governor of Guayaquil.

The Luzárraga family, originating from the Basque regions of Spain, first appears in the history of Spanish nobility when they obtained the Sello Mayor de Hidalguía in the lordships of Vizcaya and Bilbao on November 23, 1650, as a reward for their military services to Spain, although the promotion of the family would only come in 1839, by the financial support given to the crown by Queen Maria Christina of the Two Sicilies during her exile in Paris, and when the monarchy returned to the Spanish throne, her daughter, Isabel II, confirmed it by Royal Decree on January 20, 1873.

The House of Luzarraga was created by royal decree of Isabel II on January 20, 1873, and put into effect on June 30, 1876, with the Guayaquilian Francisco Gabriel de Luzárraga y Rico, son of General Manuel Antonio de Luzárraga and Francisca Rico y Rocafuerte, niece of Vicente Rocafuerte, who was president of Ecuador between 1835 and 1839. The Luzárraga family also briefly became rulers in Ecuador following the October 9 Revolution.

== Origins ==
While it is not known who the original household that adopted the house's surname was, a possible etymological origin can be found referenced in Basque author Juan Ramón de Iturriza y Gárate Zabala's book Historia General de Vizcaya. Iturriza mentions a friar, who among others in a shift of movement among churches, came to a parish in a place in the Basque region that he calls Luzarraga, although it lacks the accent possessed by the noble family.

== French-Basque Luzárragas ==
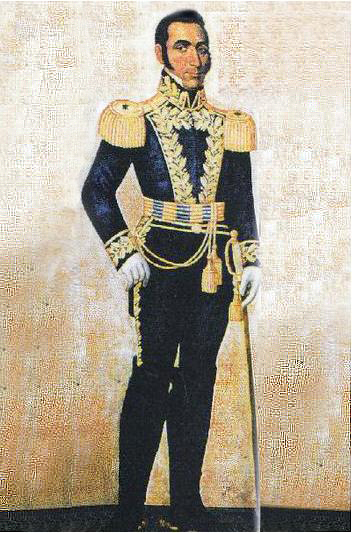
Manuel Antonio Luzárraga, 1820

While the House of Luzárraga originally lived in the regions of Pais Vasco and Navarre, the modern French branch consists of the descendants of Manuel Antonio de Luzárraga y Echezuria and Francisca Rico y Rocafuerte, who like many aristocratic families of Ecuador, undertook repeated trips to France and two of their children ended up settling in Paris, acquiring large properties, where they resided while they were educated. Manuel was the son of Miguel Antonio de Luzárraga and Maria de Echezuria. His parents married in October 1795 at the Santa Maria de la Asuncion church in Mundaca, Vizcaya.

=== Francisco Gabriel I, Count of Luzárraga ===
In Paris, Francisco Gabriel de Luzárraga y Rico met María Antonia Barrón y Añorga, daughter of Eustaquio Barrón Cantillón and Cándida Añorga Ferreira. Antonia came from a family of Mexican nobility, descendant of Gaditanos living in Tepic, the capital of the Mexican state of Nayarit.

The House of Luzárraga supplied the textile factory of Jauja, one of Eustaquio Barrón's businesses in Peru. With this background, it is possible that Francisco and Antonia met through the commercial activities of his parents.^{[says who?]}

The couple settled in France and had five children, Manuel Antonio, the future heir of the House of Luzárraga, María Cándida, Eustaquio Luzarraga, María Dolores Adela, and Gabriela Del Pilar.

Luzárraga was known for his short temper, with it being recorded that he had slapped an officer in the face after he had disrespected his commanding officer.

==== Manuel Antonio II, Count of Luzárraga ====
Manuel Antonio de Luzárraga y Barrón, in 1892, would become the head of the House of Luzárraga and a founding member of the Journal de la Société des Américanistes presided by M. Henry Vignaud and Prince Roland Napoléon Bonaparte. He died in Paris, alone in his room at the Hotel Mont-Fleuri 21, avenue de la Grande-Armée.

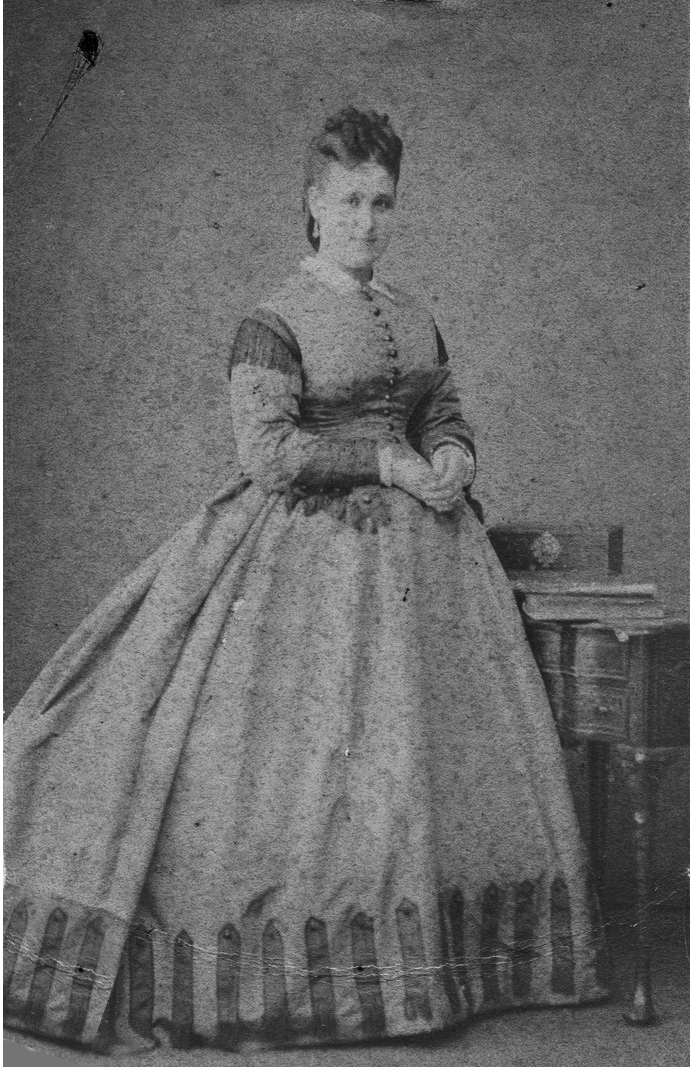
Adela de Luzárraga y Rico de Thomassa, 1860

==== María de los Dolores Adela, Countess of Ligniville ====
María de los Dolores Adela de Luzárraga y Barrón became Countess of Ligniville by her marriage in Paris to Count Gérard François Joseph de Ligniville, son of the Count Antoine Louis of Ligniville and Countess Blanche Armande of Poulletier and Auffay.

=== Adela Luzárraga y Rico ===
Adela was a survivor of the fire at the Bazar de la Charité in Paris in 1897. She was born in Guayaquil and was baptized at Saint-Pierre de Chaillot in 1873. After she married, she returned with her husband Juan Luis Thomassa to France and like her brother Francisco Gabriel, Adela entered the Parisian nobility. She died at the age of 98.

Adela and her family partly owned production of the Wheal Vor Mine in the 1850s and was guaranteed a return following the closure of the mine.

Her brother, Juan José (1830-1904), married Angelina Wright.

==== Ana María, Marquess of Cossart and Espies ====
Born in France, Ana Maria was the daughter of Manuel de Thomassa and Adela de Luzárraga y Rico, and mother of Viscount Christian Cossart of Espies, who died on November 16, 1917, in WWI.

She married Marquis Christian Cossart d'Espies on November 11, 1880, who was a descendant of Viscount Jean-Baptiste Gabriel of Cossart and Espiès, governor of Sainte-Menehould.

== The Bank of Luzárraga ==
=== Origins ===
Head of the house, Manuel Antonio Luzárraga, first arrived in Ecuador from Europe in 1814 as part of an assistance job to a schooner captain. Soon after arrival, the Luzárraga family began business dealings with locals in the country. The first bank founded in Ecuador was the "Banco Particular", founded by Manuel Antonio de Luzarraga, established in Guayaquil around 1862. It was given the authority to issue banknotes with backing in precious metals, as well as loan credit to governments.

The importance and status of the Luzárraga family in Ecuador are verified by outside sources. In his writing, Voyages dans les Ameriques, French captain Gabriel-Pierre Lafond recalls Manuel Luzárraga being among the men he encountered when he landed in Guayaquil in 1828. He referred to him as one of the authority figures in the city.

=== Role in Ecuadorian Economy & Banking ===
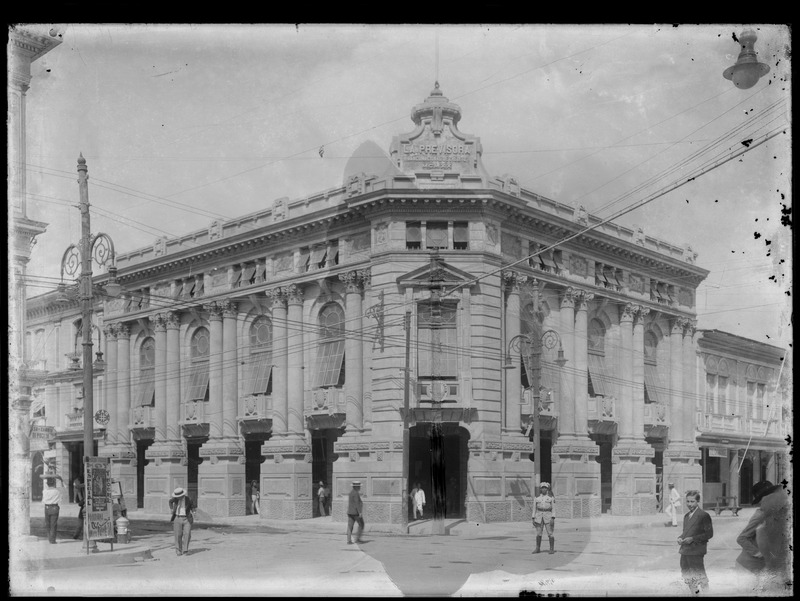
Old Previsora Bank of the House of Luzarraga, 1922

Before the family began operating their own financial establishments, Manuel had already been long involved with the production of currency, as well as debt collection, in the country. In July 1822, Luzárraga's representatives requested that a debt by General Francisco de Paula Santander, who would later become the president of Colombia, be repaid in the form of "a colonel's sword, steel scabbard, a pair of epaulettes and braid for a dolman." On August 8, 1842, Manuel was one of the men, along with other governmental officials, who were responsible for the removal and burning of currency that were the subject of errors in production. The group burned 1,903 banknotes, equating to thousands of pesos. In 1842, he was also responsible in settling on the formatting, numbering, and labelling for banknotes in production.

Upon the death of his relative in 1847, Luzarraga was designated as the executor of President Rocafuerte's will.

At the beginning of 1859, the House of Luzárraga had already amassed large fortunes, thanks in part due to the lucrative cocoa industry in the equatorial regions of South America at the time. Colombian writer Rufino Cuervo, in a letter dated November 6th, 1840, stated that he believed Manuel Antonio de Luzarraga to be "the richest man in Ecuador, and perhaps, in [all of Colombia]...."

The Ecuadorian independence hero Manuel Antonio de Luzárraga obtained authorization from the government to establish a bank in Guayaquil. A bank was created under the name of Banco de Circulación y Descuento de Manuel Antonio de Luzarraga (later to be renamed Banco de Provisora).

In November 1860, the Banco del Ecuador began operations in Guayaquil under authorization of General José Antonio Gómez Valverde. Initially, it operated with banknotes ceded by the Bank of Manuel Antonio de Luzarraga, but later it put its own banknotes into circulations with denominations of 2 and 4 reales, and 1, 5, 10, 20, 100, 500, and 1,000 pesos. The bank was given permission to issue up to 500,000 Pesos, and was allowed to maintain reserves of up to 50,000 pesos in silver coinage. Later, in 1861, the National Convention granted the bank a further right to mint 200,000 pesos worth of coinage. While it is unclear how long the bills were in circulation, there was a dispute in the 1860s about the banknotes that General Guillermo Franco authorized, but the Jefe Superior rejected as legal tender.

On banknotes printed in London in 1863 by the Bank of Luzarraga, portraits of Manuel Antonio de Luzárraga and his wife Francisca Rico Rocafuerte are present.

From 1864 to 1869, Lizardo García worked at the Bank of Luzarraga in the accounting and administration departments. He would later become the President of Ecuador.

In an 1891 deed of transaction of the sons of Manuel Luzárraga, it is mentioned that a single strip of their hacienda (named Guaquilla), located in Babahoyo, contained over 1,600 cocoa trees. For scale, the hacienda would have produced over 3,000 pounds of chocolate every year, which, adjusted for inflation, would have been worth over $20,000 at the time. The strip was sold to the government in order to build a road named "La Via Flores". They were compensated by the government by payment of 1,920 sucres, which was equivalent to 1,419 ounces of silver, or in modern currency, equivalent to over $34,500.

Gallery of Luzárragan Banknotes
1 Peso note	5 Peso note (variant 1)	5 Peso note (variant 2)	10 Peso note
1 Peso note, Historical Archives, House of Luzárraga	5 Peso note, Historical Archives, House of Luzárraga	5 Peso note, Historical Archives, House of Luzárraga	10 Peso note, Historical Archives, House of Luzárraga

== Succession ==
At the present time, the title no longer corresponds to the old family of Luzárraga, due to marriages and deaths in the various branches of the family. Since the death of Manuel Antonio Count of Luzárraga in Paris, who had no living heirs, the title passed down to the descendants of his relative Manuel Antonio de Luzárraga Wright, starting with his^{[Unclear who]} nephew Tobías de Luzárraga y Coronel.

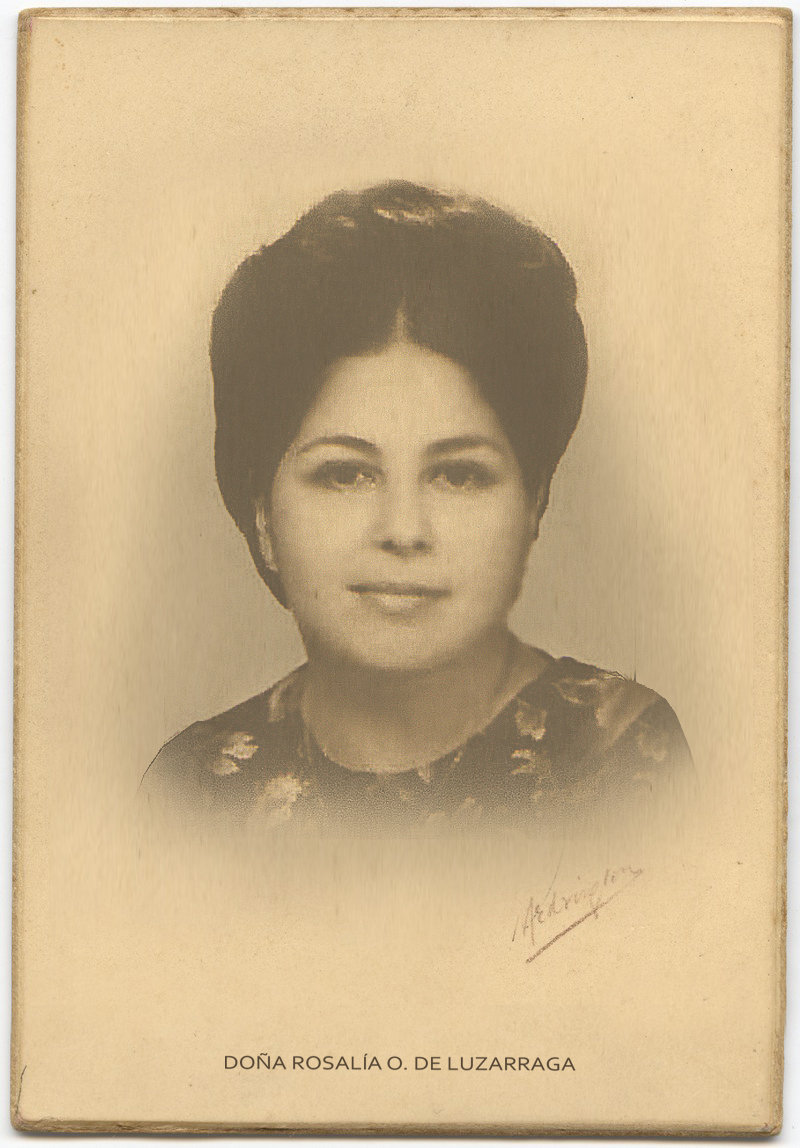
Rosalía Olvera de Luzárraga, Former Head of the House

== Title Holders ==
- General Manuel Antonio Luzárraga y Echezuria - Founder of the Basque-Navarrian Lineage
- Francisco Gabriel de Luzárraga y Rico, Count of Luzárraga, from 1873-1892
- Manuel Antonio de Luzárraga y Barron II, Count of Luzárraga, from 1892-1952
- Tobías de Luzárraga y Coronel (abdicated for his son, Laurentio Luzárraga y Valencia to marry Josefina Valencia)
- Laurentino Lusciniano, last representative of the House of Luzárraga

The title has been vacant from 1952 onwards.

== Legacy ==
=== Former Banco de Previsora building ===
Declared cultural heritage, this building was a site that held the interview between the generals Simón Bolívar and José de San Martín that occurred on July 26, 1822 (also known as the Guayaquil Conference), when the house was a family home, owned by the Manuel Antonio. For that reason, two plaques are embedded in its facade that commemorate the site.

=== Church of Santa María ===
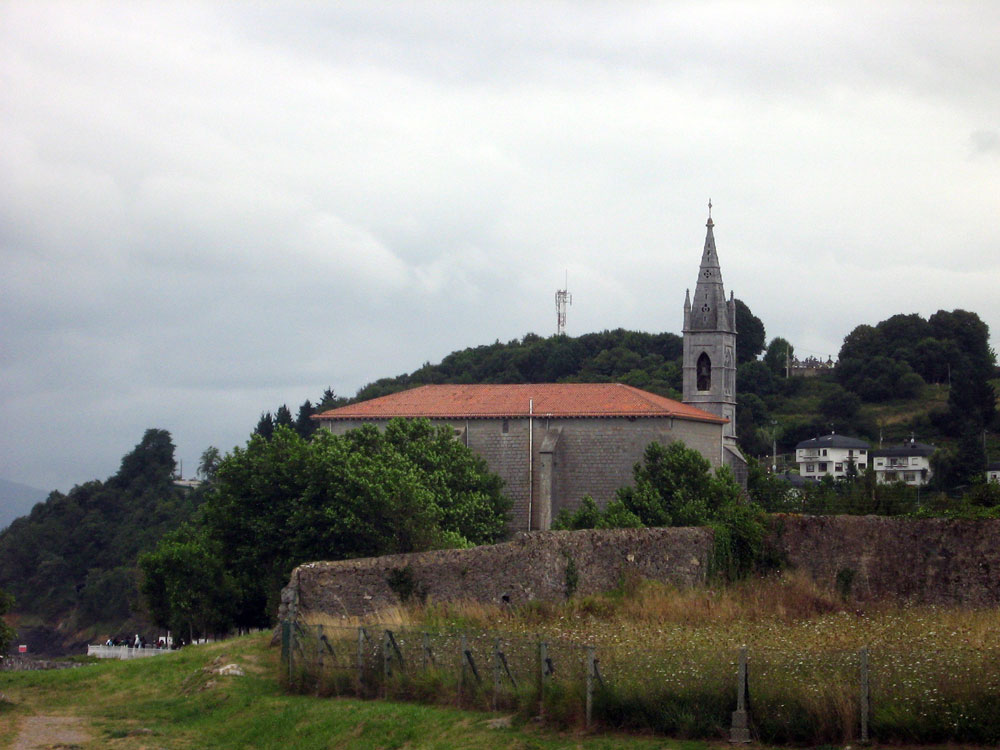
Church of Santa Maria in Mundaca

In 1852, Manuel Antonio de Luzárraga returned to Bilbao to visit his parents, taking with him large amounts of cocoa as a reconciliation gift. He extended his visit to Mundaca and gave the parish church of Santa Maria, where he had been baptized, a bronze bell that is still preserved in the church with the engraving:

Spanish: "Fue dorado este Altar y erigido su nuevo presbiterio a expensas de Don Manuel Antonio de Luzárraga."

English (translation): "This altar was and its new presbytery erected at the expense of Don Manuel Antonio de Luzárraga."

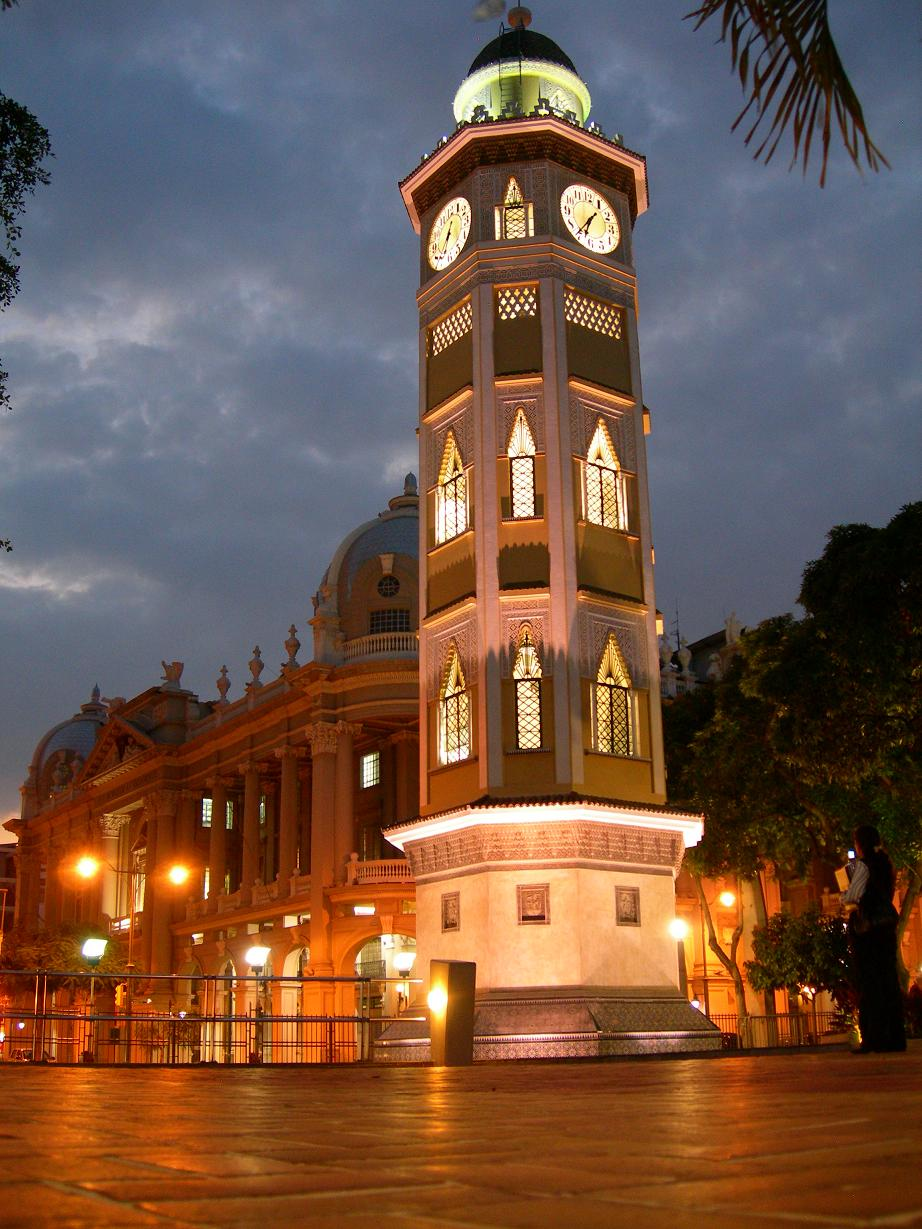
Public Clock Tower at Guayaquil

=== Sagrados Corazones Bilingual Educational Unit ===
The House of Luzárraga developed in the field of commerce, banking and industry in Guayaquil. In 1828, Manuel built from his own money the first school for girls in Ecuador that years later, in the time of Gabriel Garcia Moreno, was given to the French mothers of the Order of the Sacred Hearts.

=== The Public Clock of Guayaquil at Torre Morsica ===
At the request of the then-governor, Vicente Rocafuerte, the House of Luzárraga donated a clock to the city of Guayaquil that was purchased in England. It was chosen to be located in the location that occupied the old Jesuit clock, on the Casa del Cabildo. This is the same clock that today stands at the top of the Torre Morisca.

=== Involvement in the History of Ecuador ===
In 1834, Manuel Antonio de Luzárraga was granted the insignia of Brigadier General after having declined a previous position as chief councilor.

In 1838, he was appointed Plenipotentiary Minister of Ecuador to Mexico.

In 1839, at the blockade of the port of Guayaquil during the War of the Confederation, Luzárraga acted as parliamentarian for the signing of a peace agreement of January 19th of 1840.^{[Doesn't line up with timeline]}

In 1851, following the abolition of slavery in Ecuador, Luzárraga was offered a position on the Junta Protectora de le Libertad de Esclavos, a board to oversee the transition of slaves to free men, as well as create law to protect the free status of former slaves in the country. He turned down the offer of position for "well-founded reasons".

==== In Historical Media ====
General Luzárraga was turned into a minor character in the 1879 historical fiction novel The Secret of the Andes: A Romance by American author Friedrich Hassaurek. The novel, along with a memoir, was written by Hassaurek following his time spent as a minister to Ecuador in the 1860s, appointed by President Lincoln.

==== Naval Force of Ecuador ====
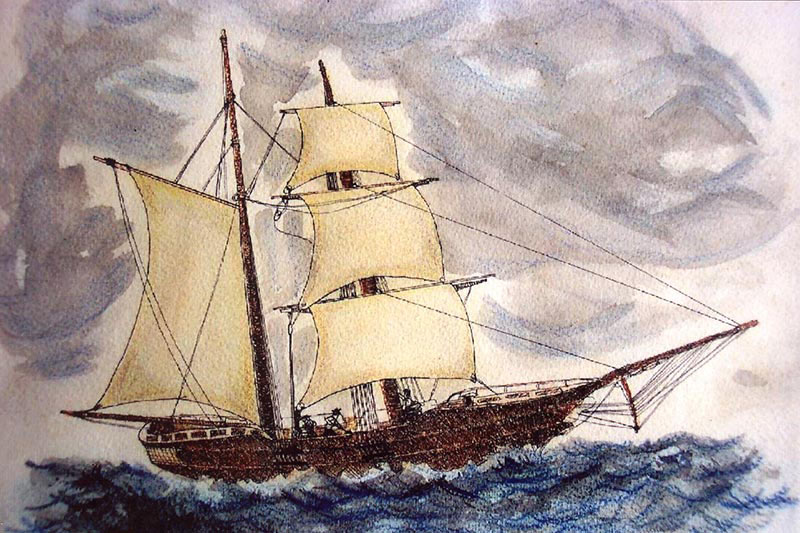
Artist's depiction of the Alcace

In 1816, Manuel, on behalf of the house, acquired the schooner Alcance from its owner José de Villamil, visiting Callao. The vessel had an exemplary performance in the liberation campaign against the Spanish. In 1818, Manuel Antonio managed the offices with Captain Manuel Loro, of Spanish nationality, This all according to the records of the National Navy, the naval history of Ecuador began with the schooner Alcance, after the Revolution of October 9, 1820, when José María Villamil was appointed as its commander.

According to Italian historican and geographer, Francesco Marmocchi^{[it]}, Manuel, along with Loro, were in part responsible for creating the movement to begin the Ecuadorian War of Independence. During the war, Luzárraga, being captain of the port of Guayaquil, was tasked by Colonel Illingworth with protecting the port to prevent people from leaving the city by locking down the estuary surrounding the port. Although he initially had government control over the port, later on, he paid 900 pesos every month for permission to use it to move his freight.

Luzárraga was also the first agent for the Pacific Steam Navigation Company in Guayaquil, shortly after their expansion to the city. In 1841, he facilitated freight and passenger ships embarkments to various other South American countries.

=== Meritorious Fire Department of Guayaquil ===
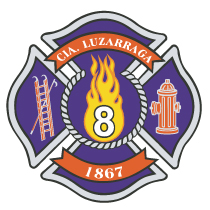
Logo of Ricofuerte and Luzárraga's Fire Department in Guayaquil

The then-president of Ecuador, Vicente Rocafuerte, member of the House of Luzárraga, was the one to create the fire department of Guayaquil in 1835. It was fellow member of the house, Manuel Luzárraga, who donated a pump to the fire department of Guayaquil, and later sponsored the department in the 1860s, being the first non-governmental benefactor of the service. A donation was made by the family following a fire that destroyed the "Senioritas Camanas" house in the form of 2 steam pump engines.

=== Basque Luzárragan Influence on Spain and Spanish Politics ===
It has been recorded that member of the Luzárraga family, Luis Luzárraga, was responsible for the restoration and reconstruction of roadpasses between Bilbao and Irun, having designed the restoration work, as well as direct the construction done to restore the pathways between the two cities.

As noted in a letter addressed to the Spanish Congress of Deputies in 1910, during a protest regarding a Supreme Court ruling on electoral law, Plácido Luzarraga, a government inspector and colleague of fellow involved politician Juan Tomás Gandarias, was beaten up by protestors and rescued by the Civil Guard after being gravely injured.

In the 1931 Spanish general election cycle, Ricardo Luzarraga was elected to city councilor in the town of Guernica.

=== Literature ===
Jose Manuel Etxeita Luzarraga was a notable Basque writer in the early 20th century who also served as the last Spanish mayor of Manila.

== See also ==
- Juan Perez de Lazarraga
- Larrinaga palace
