= Ghantasala =

Ghantasala may refer to:

== People ==
- Ghantasala (musician) (Ghantasala Venkateswara Rao, 1922–1974), Telugu singer and composer
- Ghantasala Balaramayya (1906 - after 1952), Telugu film producer and director
- Ghantasala Sai Srinivas, professionally known as S. Thaman, an Indian music composer

== Places ==
- Ghantasala, Krishna district, Andhra Pradesh, India
  - Ghantasala mandal

== See also ==
- Ghanta Ghar (disambiguation)
- Ghanta, the bell in Hindu temples
- Sala (disambiguation)
- Shala (disambiguation)
