= Ghanta Ghar =

Ghanta Ghar literally means Hour House in Hindi–Urdu and Punjabi, implying Clock House or Clock tower. There are several Ghanta Ghars in India, Nepal and Pakistan.

India

- Ghantaghar in the center of Chandni Chowk, Delhi, Punjab
- Ghanta Ghar metro station, Delhi Metro, Punjab
- Ghanta Ghar (Jodhpur) in Jodhpur, Rajasthan
- Ghanta Ghar, Mirzapur, Uttar Pradesh

Nepal
- Ghanta Ghar (Kathmandu)

Pakistan
- Clock Tower, Multan in Punjab, Pakistan
- Cunningham Clock Tower in Peshawar, Khyber-Pakhtunkhwa, Pakistan
- Clock Tower, Faisalabad in Punjab, Pakistan
- Clock Tower, Sialkot in Punjab, Pakistan

== See also ==
- Ghanta, the bell in Hindu temples
- Ghar (disambiguation)
- Ghantasala (disambiguation)
- Clock House (disambiguation)
- Clock Tower (disambiguation)
