= Clock House =

Clock House may refer to the following places in England:

- Clock House, London, an area near Beckenham, in the London Borough of Bromley
  - Clock House (ward)
  - Clock House railway station
- Clock House Brickworks, a palaeoenvironmental site in Surrey

== See also ==
- Ghanta Ghar (disambiguation)
