= Dante Reyes =

Ecuadorian fraudster (1947–2013)

- Born: Sigifredo Dante Reyes Moreno; 1 July 1947; Muisne, Esmeraldas, Ecuador
- Died: 16 December 2013 (aged 66); Quito, Pichincha, Ecuador
- Other name: "El Cuentero de Muisne"
- Education: University of Guayaquil
- Occupations: Agronomist engineer, Con artist and impostor
- Criminal charges: Fraud, theft, and murder
- Criminal penalty: 25 years in prison from April 2005 for robbery and murder, of which he served 8 years due to his death in December 2013
- Criminal status: Deceased from cardiovascular complications while serving his sentence
- Mother: Delfina Moreno

Dante Reyes, alias "El Cuentero de Muisne" (English: The Storyteller of Muisne) (1 July 1947 – 16 December 2013) was an Ecuadorian agronomist engineer who was convicted for a series of fraud cases and prison escapes. He was also accused and convicted in connection with a homicide case. He is best known for a 1980 fraud in which he sold Guayaquil's municipal Clock Tower on the Malecón Simón Bolívar in Guayaquil to a European couple using forged documents.

== Biography ==
=== Early years ===
Dante Reyes was born in Muisne, an island in Esmeraldas province, on 1 July 1947. His mother was Delfina Moreno. According to accounts published in the Ecuadorian press, his father was a farmer who named him Dante after finding a copy of Dante Alighieri's Divine Comedy on the beach. He studied at the San Luis Gonzaga school, where he stood out for having a good memory; however, according to him, from the age of six he had the habit of taking others' belongings, therefore he stated that he probably tended to be kleptomaniac. He graduated as an agronomist engineer from the Casona Universitaria Pedro Carbo at the University of Guayaquil.

=== Scams and deceptions ===
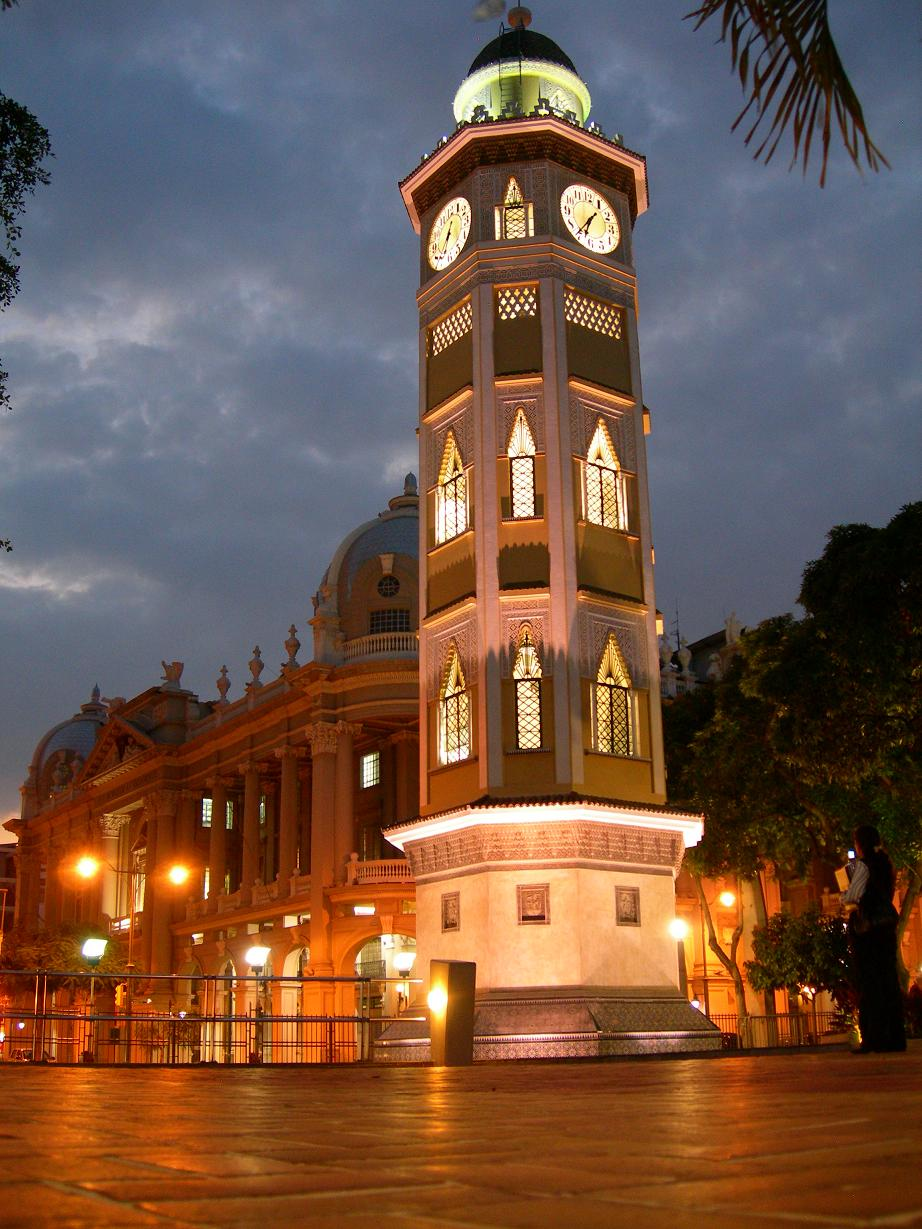
Clock Tower that the "Cuentero de Muisne" sold in 1980.

At the age of twenty-two, he posed as a Venezuelan businessman with the intention of investing and generating employment in order to stay at one of the best hotels in Esmeraldas. Due to this, a celebration was held for him at the Lions Club, where he networked with important people whom he convinced to give him 12,000 sucres as an investment; however, he was discovered shortly after and received a court sentence.

In 1967, in the town of San Carlos, he assumed the false identity of an agronomist engineer named César Temístocles Flor Yela, trafficked cocaine paste, and then married Dr. Lucila Santos, until he was discovered and imprisoned. Reyes claimed that when she discovered who he really was, they remarried under his true identity.

Between 1966 and 1968, he posed as the son of José Joaquín Trejos, president of Costa Rica, when Otto Arosemena was president of Ecuador, managing to stay at the Hotel Colón until the Ecuadorian president's daughter discovered him.

One day, while fleeing from justice from Manabí, he arrived in Cuenca, where he posed as a devout Basque to convince the bishop to appoint him priest of Santa Isabel. There he celebrated baptisms, masses, and weddings for three months; he then decided to leave before being discovered and reportedly because he saw little profit from the alms.

In the late 1970s, he reportedly obtained management of a banana plantation in Los Ríos Province by posing as a Japanese businessman named Dante Makoto Chim Bolo, with a profit of 180,000 sucres monthly. According to Dante, many Ecuadorian engineers applied for the position, but the banana company preferred a foreigner. Much later he requested a loan of 30 million sucres from the bank and after attempting to buy a company under his real name, he was sent to prison.

His best-known fraud took place in 1980, when he sold the municipal Clock Tower on Guayaquil's Malecón Simón Bolívar to a Swiss couple for 160,000 sucres using forged title documents. Other frauds attributed to him include purported sales of the Plaza de la Rotonda, the Palacio Municipal, and a pedestrian street in the Urdesa district of Guayaquil.

=== Imprisonment and escapes ===
Reyes was repeatedly imprisoned for fraud and theft. Ecuadorian press accounts state that he spent approximately 24 years in prison and escaped on numerous occasions, often using disguises. Reported escapes included leaving prison dressed as a priest, a nun, and a sanitation worker. According to press reports, he also rented out his cell on visiting days for conjugal relations. One of his most widely reported escapes occurred on 11 August 1993, when he left Quito's former García Moreno prison disguised as a priest and was recaptured later that year.

On 26 October 2004 he was captured in Esmeraldas for the theft of a truck and then escaped. Finally, on 6 April 2005, he was arrested in Santo Domingo de los Colorados and accused of stealing a vehicle from César Segovia, and of Segovia's death, who was found in a ravine in Esmeraldas, for which he was sentenced to 25 years in prison at the former García Moreno Penitentiary in Quito, where he spent the last years of his life. During his sentence he claimed to be ten years older than his real age so that his sentence would be reduced; he even claimed in an interview to have been born in 1939.

=== Private life ===
While serving his last sentence starting in 2005, he met the woman who would become his last wife, who was visiting an imprisoned brother.

During his imprisonment, Reyes gave several interviews to Ecuadorian media and stated that he was writing a memoir Yo Dante, lo vivido (I, Dante: The Life I Lived). No published edition of the book was confirmed during his lifetime.

=== Death ===
On 16 December 2013, he died of cardiac complications at the Eugenio Espejo specialty hospital in the city of Quito, after being hospitalized for over a month. Two days later, his relatives and friends came to collect his remains and he was buried in Esmeraldas the following day. According to the death certificate, Reyes died at sixty-six years of age, and not seventy-five, as had been previously believed.

== Origin of the alias "Cuentero" ==
Traditionally, in some parts of the world and in certain places in Ecuador, a cuentero is someone who masters the oral art of telling stories of imaginary genres, in order to keep the oral tradition of a culture alive. However, for Ecuadorians, it is also associated with someone who, through lies, deceives others for the purpose of fraud and who presents a pleasant appearance and is charismatic. This latter concept is associated with Dante Reyes, and to it, he owes his alias of "Cuentero de Muisne".
