= Clock Tower, Anantapur =

Clock tower in Andhra Pradesh, India

Clock Tower
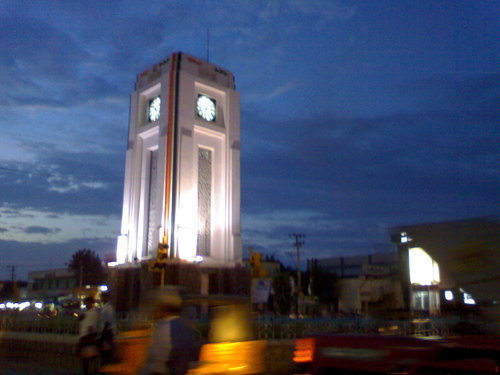
- Clock Tower in Anantapur
- Interactive map of the Clock Tower area

General information
- Location: Anantapur, Andhra Pradesh, India
- Coordinates: 50°50′12″N 4°21′6″E
- Inaugurated: 15 August 1947
- Owner: Anantapur Municipal Corporation

Height
- Height: 47 ft (14 m)

Clock Tower is a structure located at the centre of Anantapur in the Indian state of Andhra Pradesh. It was built in memory of martyrs of the Indian freedom movement. In 1945, under the leadership of M. Ramachandra Naidu, the district judge and other individuals took initiative to construct the structure. Its radius is 15 feet which signifies the date 15th. It has 8 faces which signifies the eighth month of the year i.e. August. The height of the Clock Tower is 47 feet which signifies the year 1947. There are 8 faces for this tower, which signifies 8th month.

== History ==
The clock tower was initiated by District Judge M. Ramachandra Naidu in late 1945. It was constructed in central Anantapur to memorialize those who sacrificed their lives during the freedom struggle. It was inaugurated on 15 August 1947, on the day of Independence. In December 2021, during road extension at Saptagiri Circle, the peripheral fixtures and statues were removed. By 19 February 2022, all statues from the traffic island surrounding the Clock Tower had been dismantled and placed in storage.

== Clock Tower Bridge ==
The Clock Tower Bridge in Anantapur is a four-lane overbridge connecting NH 44 with NH 42 as part of a ₹310 crore, 9.2 km widening of SH-32 through the city center. Built in a record two years and five months on a "war footing", it was inaugurated on 29 May 2023 and opened to traffic from 31 May 2023, restoring direct highway flow and dramatically reducing congestion through Saptagiri Circle. The bridge’s completion has not only eased long-standing traffic bottlenecks but also underpins broader urban and economic development in Anantapur.
