= Ben Bowen =

American boy diagnosed with cancer (2002–2005)

- "Big Ben" Bowen
- Born: Benjamin David "Ben" Bowen; November 14, 2002; Huntington, West Virginia, US
- Died: February 25, 2005 (aged 2); Huntington, West Virginia, US
- Cause of death: Brain cancer (ATRT)
- Resting place: Ridgelawn Memorial Park
- Other name: "Big Ben"
- Website: http://www.bens-story.com

Benjamin David "Ben" Bowen (November 14, 2002 – February 25, 2005), commonly called Big Ben Bowen, was an American boy from Huntington, West Virginia who was diagnosed with an aggressive brain tumor in 2004. His family has used his story to raise awareness of childhood cancer and to raise almost $4 million for St. Jude Children's Research Hospital in Memphis, Tennessee.

== Bowen's life ==
On November 14, 2002, Ben Bowen was born to Tom and Jennifer Bowen. Ben had a normal infancy until age 16 months, when he was diagnosed with a golf-ball–sized tumor in the middle of his brain. Bowen went to Cincinnati Children's Hospital for emergency brain surgery. The tumor proved to be a very aggressive, rare, and fast-growing atypical teratoid rhabdoid tumor (AT/RT). The Bowens transferred to St. Jude Children's Research Hospital in March 2004.

Ben's initial treatments included four brain surgeries, chemotherapy, and radiation therapy. During this treatment period, Ben Bowen picked up the nickname "Big Ben" because of his "big" demeanor, bravery and smile. The tumor reoccurred by November 2004, and no known medicines or treatments were left to help him.

With assistance from FedEx and the family of a victim in the September 11 attacks (whom Tom assisted in the recovery of), the Bowen family took Ben on a special two-week trip to Disney World, where they celebrated his second birthday.

== Fundraising ==
The Bowens wanted to create a legacy in their son's name and thank St. Jude for caring for Bowen and providing family housing. The Bowens started a fund raising program selling "Big Ben" awareness bracelets for Valentine's Day. The wristband project ended up raising over US$120,000

The 2007 fundraising drive was a raffle for a house (called The House that Ben Built) located in Putnam County, West Virginia, which brought in $808,000. Governor Joe Manchin changed WV state law to make this raffle possible. As a result, St. Jude launched a WV field office that organizes all state fundraising for the hospital. In 2008 the Bowen family organized a second St. Jude Dream Home Giveaway raffle in Hurricane, WV and raised over $1,000,000. The third annual WV St. Jude Dream Home was scheduled to expand to two locations, Milton and Morgantown, WV, in 2009.

== Death ==
Bowen's last months were physically painful. Morphine did not manage his pain adequately, his body tripled in size, and he would regurgitate fecal matter. The neuropathic pain became so severe, his parents could not hold him. Ben died on February 25, 2005.

Funeral services were held on Tuesday, March 1, 2005, at River Cities Community Church in Huntington, West Virginia. The funeral cortege traveled on the highway that now bears Ben's name on the way to the cemetery. Survivors include his parents, an older brother Eli, two brothers and two sisters born after his death. Ben's family moved to the Memphis, Tennessee area, and Tom Bowen first went to work for St. Jude Children's Hospital raising funds to cure pediatric cancer, later working on creating the Childhood Cancer Network as Ben Bowen's legacy.

== Honors ==
- Ben Bowen was the St. Jude Children's Hospital Patient of the Month for September 2004.
- Shelby County, Tennessee Sheriff Mark Luttrell declared December 6, 2004, to be Benjamin Bowen Day.

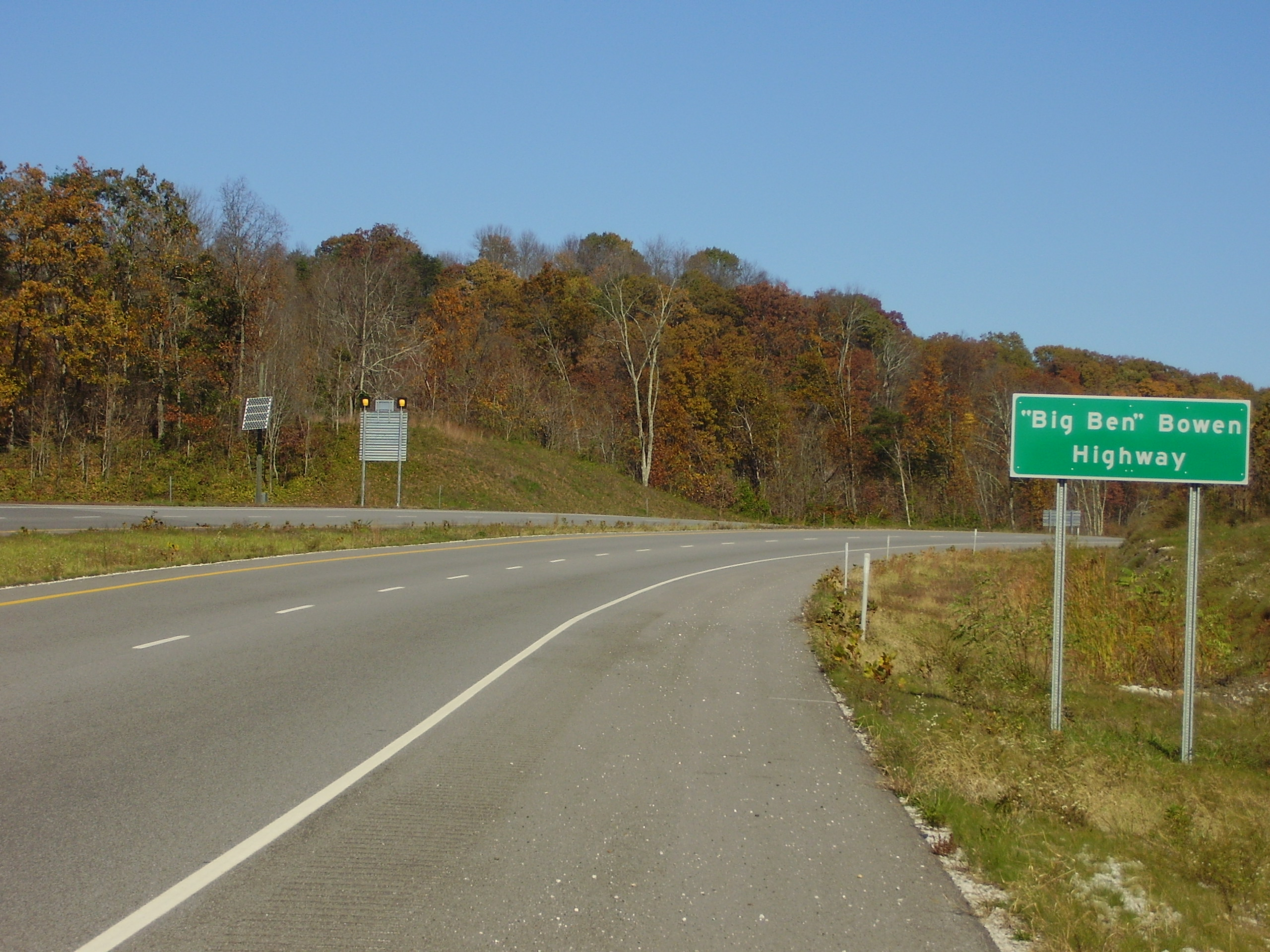
WV 193 is also called the "Big Ben" Bowen Highway.

- West Virginia Governor Joe Manchin honored Bowen's life with a special citation on February 13, 2005.
- The State Journal honored Bowen and his family as one of 55 Good Things about West Virginia in May, 2005 This honor was published in a 2005 State Journal special issue. This story was also featured in an associated TV program, which was broadcast on a number of West Virginia Media Holdings stations.
- Huntington, West Virginia started the "Annual Big Ben 5K for Kids". It has been held each June and benefits St. Jude Children's Hospital as well as families with sick children.
- A new four-lane bypass, West Virginia Route 193, near Huntington, West Virginia was named the "Big Ben" Bowen Highway in September, 2006.

== Ben Bowen's influence ==
- Ben Bowen's story has raised almost $4 million for St. Jude Children's Hospital.
- Ben Bowen and his family were featured in the 2004 Autumn issue of Saint Jude's Promise, a magazine published by the hospital. It described how the 9/11 families that firefighter Tom Bowen helped, in turn helped Ben Bowen.
- St. Jude's Children's Hospital produced one-hour special TV show, Fighting for Life that featured Ben Bowen as one of six patients being treated for childhood cancer at Saint Jude. Alan Alda narrated Bowen's story. This special has been broadcast a number of times since its first airing in 2005 and has raised substantial funds for cancer research at St. Jude Children's Hospital.
- In 2007, WCHS Eyewitness News and Fox 11 produced a seven-part series on Ben Bowen's life and St. Jude Children's Hospital to help raise funds for Saint Jude's via a raffle for the "House That Ben Built." It raised over $800,000.

== See also ==
- List of notable brain tumor patients
