= West Virginia Route 193 =

State highway in Cabell County, West Virginia, United States

West Virginia Route 193

Route information
- Maintained by WVDOH
- Length: 3.6 mi (Note: Calculated using trip planning software) (5.8 km)
- Existed: Winter 2005–present

Major junctions
- South end: US 60 in Barboursville
- I-64 in Barboursville
- North end: WV 2 near Lesage

Location
- Country: United States
- State: West Virginia
- Counties: Cabell

Highway system
- West Virginia State Highway System; Interstate; US; State
← WV 180	→ WV 210

West Virginia Route 193 (also known as the "Big Ben" Bowen Highway) is a north–south route extending from U.S. Route 60 at Barboursville to West Virginia Route 2 just east of Huntington.

== History ==
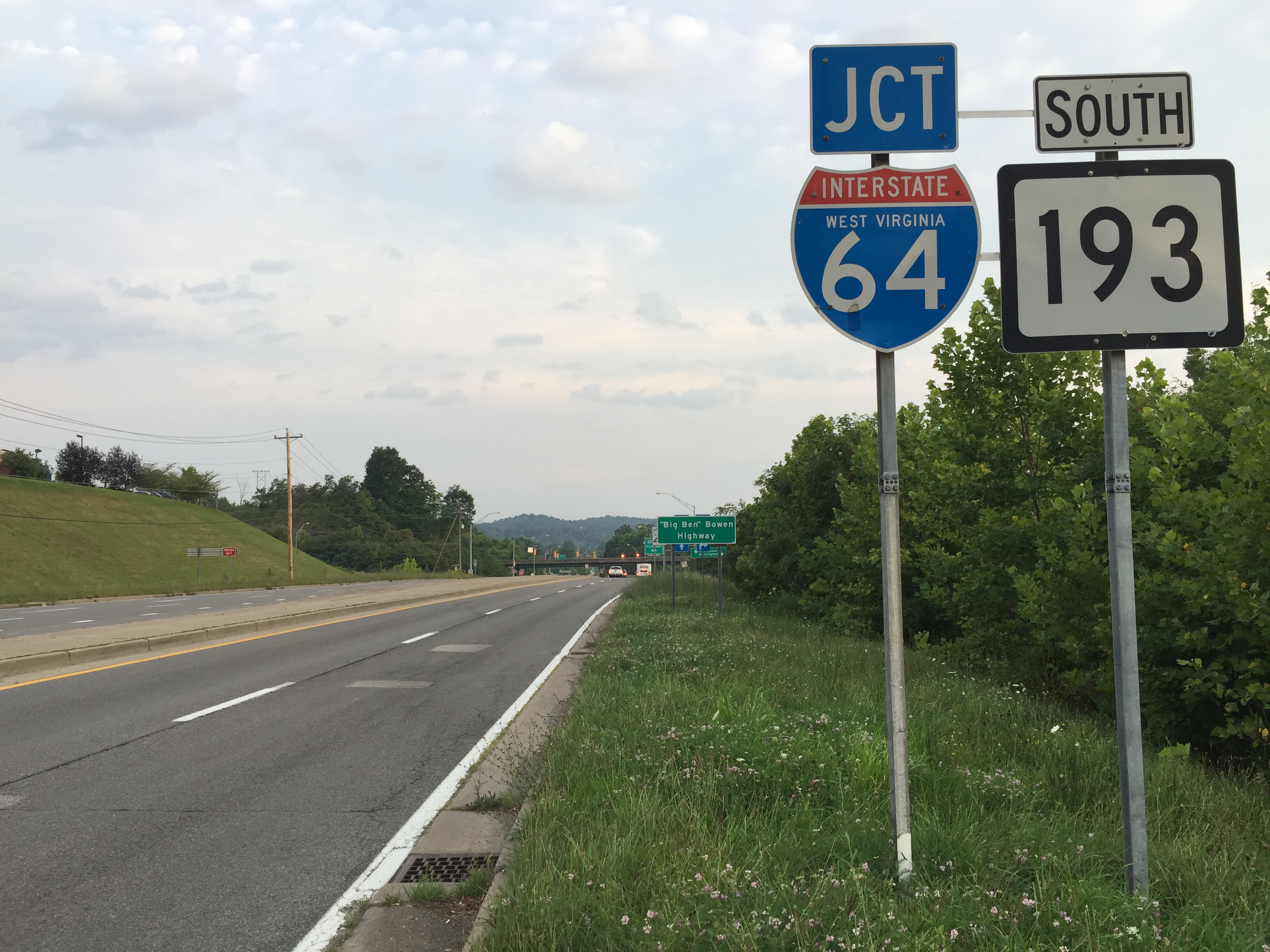
View south along WV 193 at CR 19 just north of I-64 in Barboursville

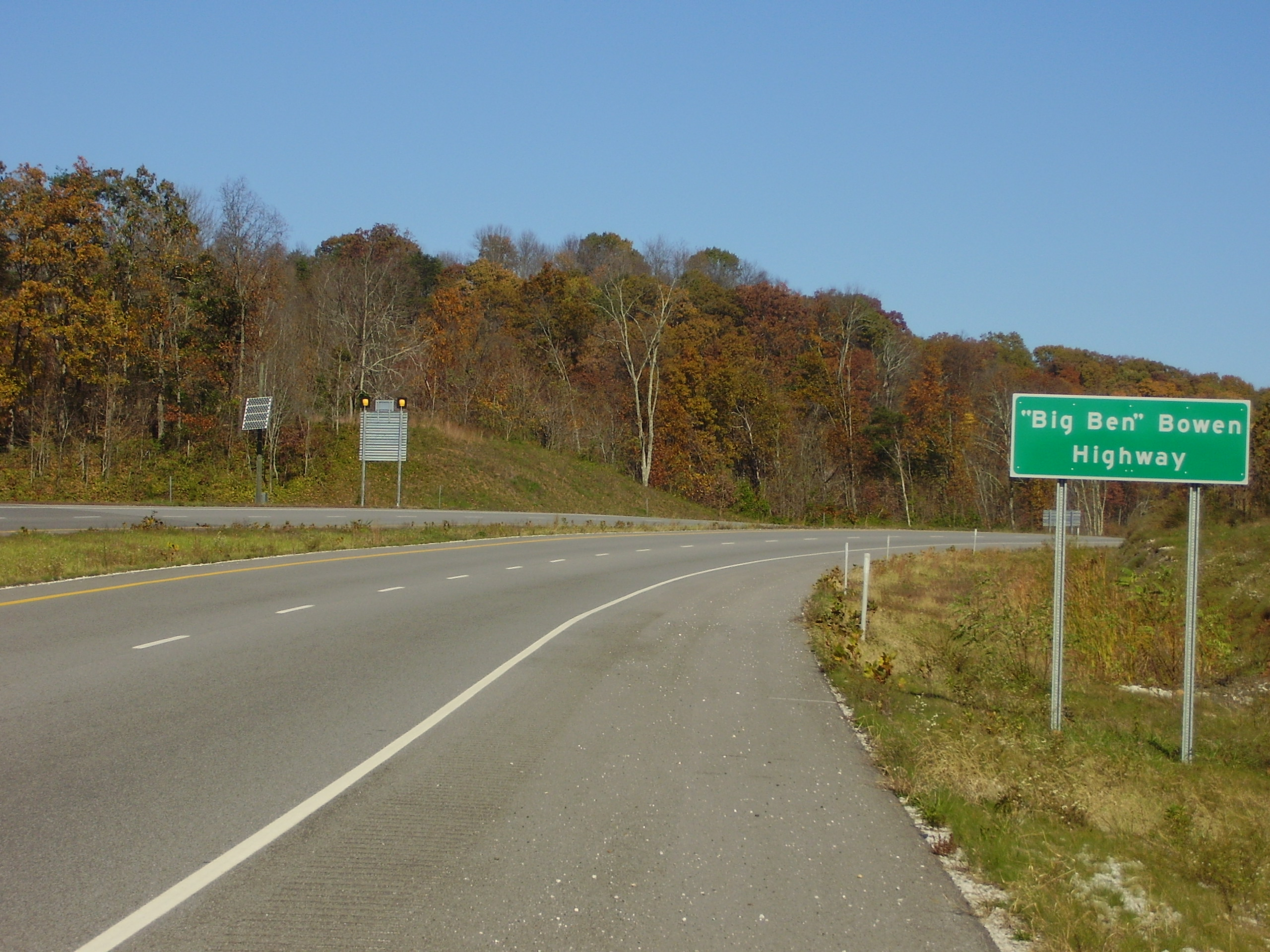
WV 193 is also called the "Big Ben" Bowen Highway

Construction began in 1999 on the Merritts Creek Connector, a four-lane divided highway from U.S. Route 60 in Barboursville to WV 2 near Lesage. The highway would bypass the existing two-lane County Route 19 (Merritts Creek Road). A 1/2 mile segment opened in 2000 that linked U.S. Route 60 in Barboursville to County Route 19. A new interchange at milepost 18 on Interstate 64 was completed as part of this phase.

In 2001, a 1.64-mile (2.64 km) northern extension from County Route 19 to County Route 24 was completed at a cost of $13.35 million. Signage and all traffic elements were completed but the road was not opened to traffic as it connected to a one-lane county route that was inadequate of handling large traffic volumes.

In late 2003, work began on the final segment of the Merritts Creek Connector that extends from County Route 24 to WV 2 near Lesage after a long delay due to a lack of funding. The final 1.45-mile (2.33 km) segment to be completed was projected to cost $15 million and was to be open by October 2004, however, it did not open until March 2005. Later that year, it was revealed with new signs that the Merrick Creek Connector would be designated West Virginia Route 193.

On September 8, 2006, Governor Joe Manchin officially declared that the route would, in addition to its WVDOT designation, would also be named the "Big Ben" Bowen Highway after Ben Bowen, an area toddler who died from cancer.

== Major intersections ==
The entire route is in Cabell County.

Location	mi	km	Destinations	Notes
Barboursville	0.0	0.0	US 60 – Milton, Huntington	
Barboursville	0.3	0.48	I-64 – Huntington, Charleston	I-64 exit 18
Barboursville	0.8	1.3	CR 19 (Merritts Creek Road)	
	3.6	5.8	WV 2 – Huntington, Point Pleasant	
1.000 mi = 1.609 km; 1.000 km = 0.621 mi
