= Big Ben (Derain) =

Painting by André Derain

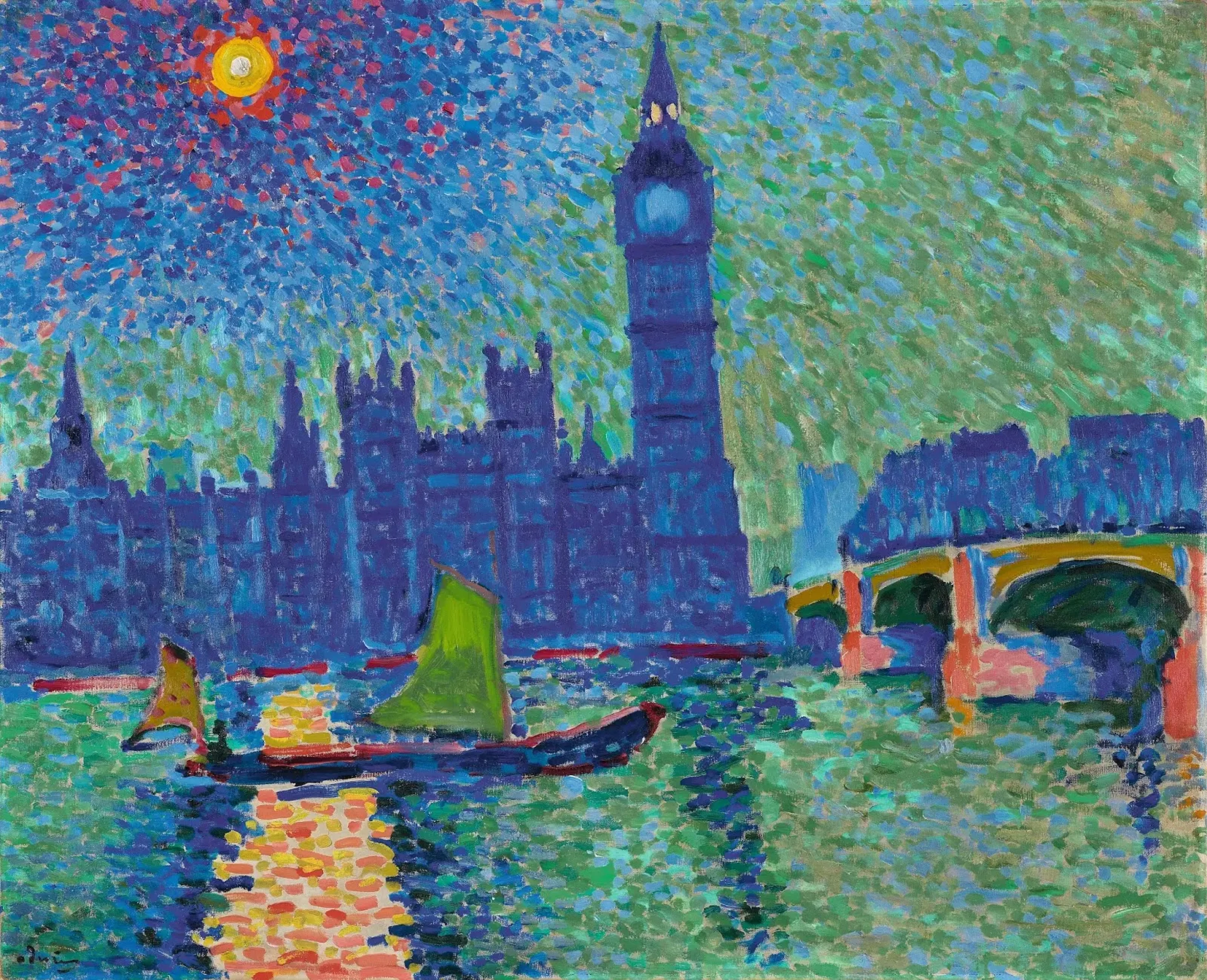
- Artist: André Derain
- Year: 1906
- Medium: oil on canvas
- Dimensions: 79 cm × 98 cm (31 in × 39 in)
- Location: Musée d'art moderne de Troyes, Troyes

Big Ben, also known as Big Ben, London, is an oil on canvas painting by the French painter André Derain, from 1906. It is held at the Musée d'art moderne de Troyes, in Troyes.

== History and description ==
This horizontal canvas in the fauvist style is an urban landscape depicting a view of London, with the Big Ben overlooking the River Thames, while in the foreground a small sailboat approaches Westminster Bridge. The Sun illuminates the cloudy atmosphere of the scene. The painting was part of a commission of fifty paintings made by the marchand Ambroise Vollard to the artist, who visited London from January to May 1906, and would return in 1907. Derain drew open inspiration from previous paintings made in London by Claude Monet, and often followed his subjects.

== Provenance ==
Purchased from Derain by Ambroise Vollard, and later acquired by Pierre and Denise Lévy, the work has been housed since 1976 at the Musée d'art moderne de Troyes.
