= Clock Tower, Sialkot =

Clock tower in Sialkot, Pakistan

- گھنٹہ گھر
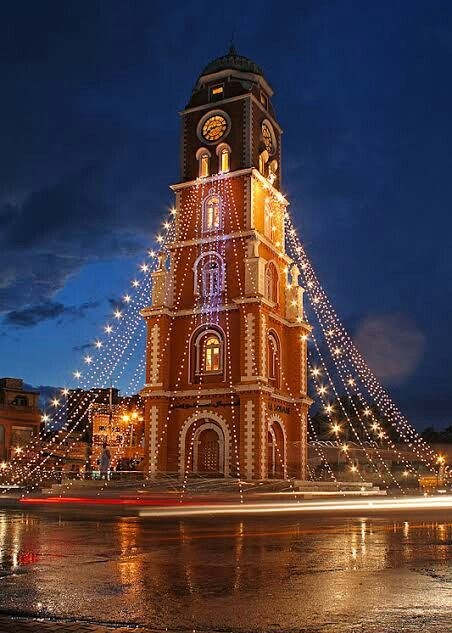
- Interactive map of the Clock Tower, Sialkot area
- Alternative names: Ghanta Ghar

General information
- Type: Clock tower
- Location: Sialkot, Punjab, Pakistan, Pakistan
- Coordinates: 32°30′58″N 74°33′23″E
- Completed: 1922
- Owner: Sialkot Cantonment

The Clock Tower, Sialkot (Urdu: سیالکوٹ گھنٹہ گھر), commonly called Ghanta Ghar, is a five-storey brick clock tower that dominates Iqbal Square in Sialkot Cantonment, Punjab, Pakistan. Completed late in the period of British India, the tower remains the city's most recognisable civic landmark and a fixed point around which commercial life in the adjoining Saddar Bazaar revolves.

== History ==
It was built in 1922. Local philanthropists Sheikh Ghulam Qadir and Seth Rai Bahadur laid the foundation stone of the tower.

After the partition, the tower served both as a ceremonial flag-raising site and as a navigational marker for trade convoys bound for the city’s sporting-goods factories.

== Architecture ==
The tower rises in five receding brick stages capped by a castellated parapet. Each elevation carries a cast-iron dial with Roman numerals, enabling time to be read from every axis of the square. Blind arches, chamfered cornices and brick pilasters lend the exterior a restrained vertical emphasis, while the unpainted brickwork harmonises with neighbouring late-Victorian storefronts. A narrow wrought-iron stair ascends to the machinery room where the original weight-driven escapement, now assisted by the 2012 quartz module, still powers an hourly chime audible across the cantonment.

== See also ==
- List of clock towers in Pakistan
- Sialkot
- Clock Tower
- Ghanta Ghar (disambiguation)
