= Korçë Clock Tower =

- Kulla e Sahatit të Korçës
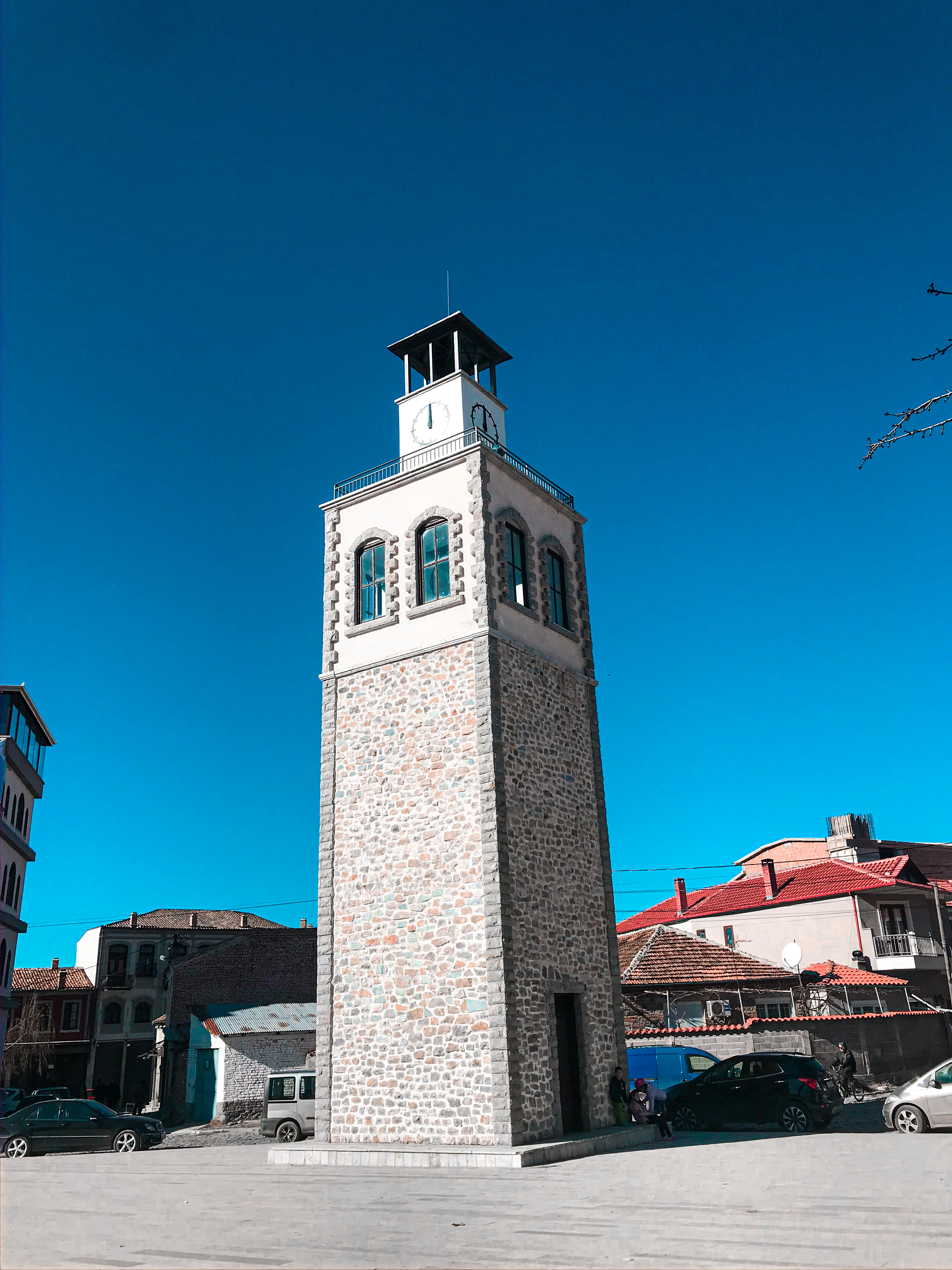
- Clock Tower of Korçë
- 40.61621°N 20.77520°E
- Type: Clock tower
- Location: Rruga "Asim Vokshi", Korçë, Albania

History
- Founder: Ilyas bey Mirahori; Local government
- Built: 2016

Site notes
- Height: 17 m (56 ft)
- Architectural style: Ottoman style
- Owner: Municipality of Korçë

The Clock Tower of Korçë (Albanian: Kulla e Sahatit të Korçës) is a clock tower located in Korçë, Albania. Rising adjacent to the Mirahori Mosque, just south of the city’s Old Bazaar, its construction was inspired by the original 18th century Ottoman-era clock tower that was destroyed by the earthquake of 1960.

== History ==
Over the centuries, Korçë transformed from a small dependency under the Sanjak of Ohrid into a thriving urban center. By the late 19th century, it had a population of 18,000 and featured two mosques, two hammams, a clock tower, a civic building and four churches.

In his encyclopedia, Sami Frashëri describes it as "a city with 757 shops and warehouses, 23 hans, two hammams, a flour mill and a clock tower".

The clock tower stood in the courtyard of the mosque built by Ilias bey Mirahori, part of the mosque’s architectural complex. Situated near the old bazaar, the tower’s positioning allowed its bell to be heard clearly by merchants and customers alike.

The original tower was constructed in 1784 by the bakers’ guild, composed of Gheg muslims and Orthodox christians from Moscopole. The guild divided its responsibilities: muslims would build the tower, while christians provided the clock and its base.

The first clock weighed 40 okas (approximately 51 kilograms), but it eventually broke down due to the absence of skilled menders. In 1893, a new clock was imported from Europe at a cost of 180 Ottoman liras and the tower was updated to accommodate it.

On January 28, 1931, a powerful earthquake struck Korçë and its surrounding villages, including Polenë, Lavdar, Gjonomadh and Voskopojë. Additional tremors occurred later that year. Reports from the time indicate that the clock had already stopped working and the tower sustained structural cracks.

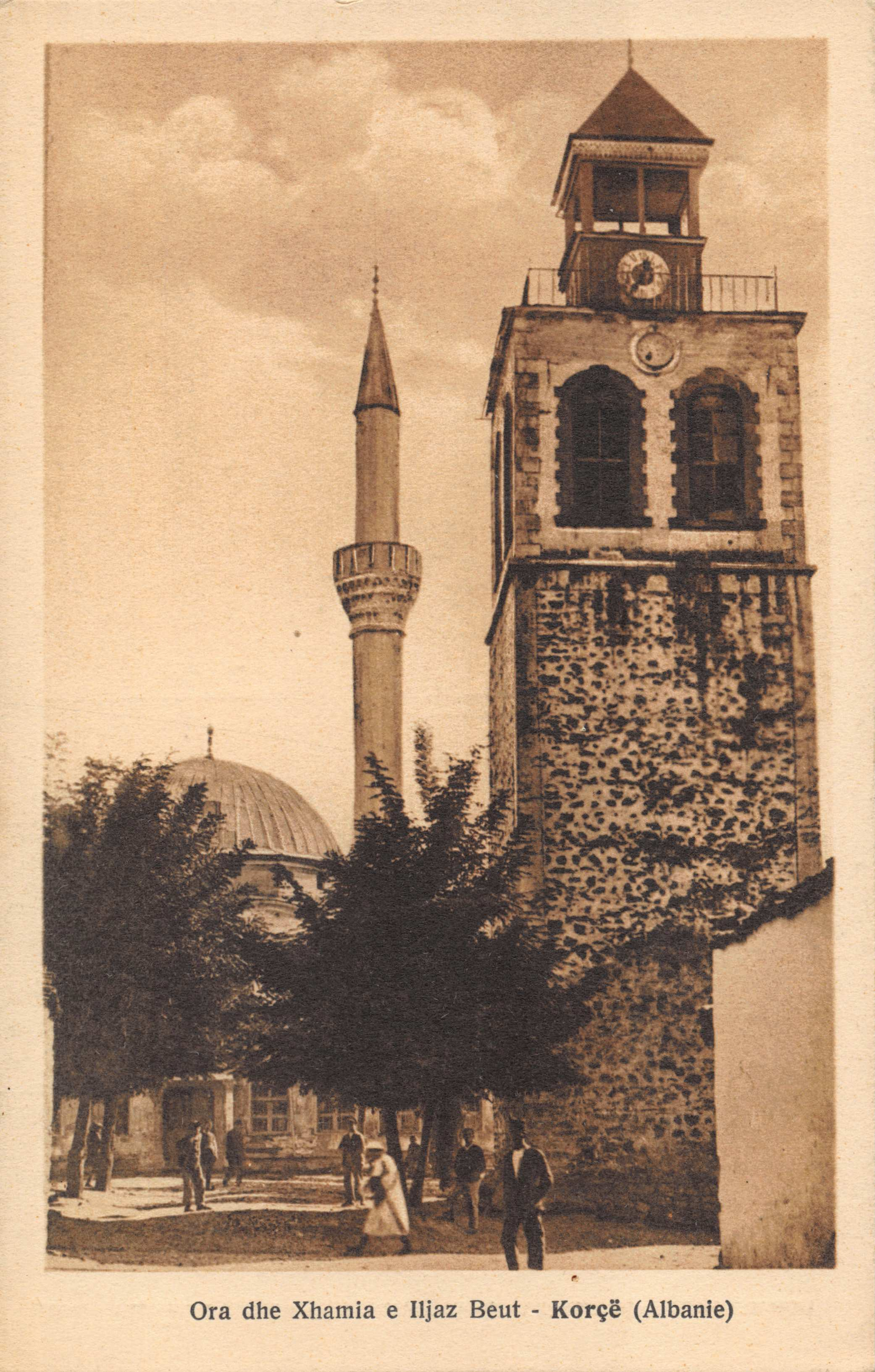
Postcard depicting the original clock tower and the Mirahori Mosque (c. 1934)

In 1933, the municipality initiated a reconstruction project to address the damage. Contemporary newspaper articles quoted snippets of the plan to modernize the tower, which was to add reinforced concrete to its upper sections and raise its height by two meters. The old stone walls were repaired and strengthened with concrete and iron. By the time renovations were complete, the clock tower featured four faces, while its base displayed arched windows.

Photographs from this period show significant changes to the structure, including the closure of its original windows, plastering over the stonemasonry and the addition of new elements such as iron railings.

The clock tower underwent two documented reconstructions: the first in 1893, when the clock mechanism was replaced and the second in 1933, when it was reinforced and modernized. However, no records exist of earlier repairs or modifications prior to 1893.

Despite these efforts, the tower was severely damaged during an earthquake on May 21, 1960 and the clock mechanism was destroyed.

== Architecture ==
The original tower was square-shaped, with an entrance facing south.

In 2015, as part of a broader restoration of the city's old bazaar, plans were initiated to reconstruct the tower near its historic site. Completed in 2016, the new structure was built using modern construction materials and methods while incorporating stone cladding to reflect the tower’s original appearance.

The new clock tower measures 4.5 x 4.5 meters at its base and rises to a full height of 17 meters, with the lower 13.3 meters clad in stone.
