= Clock Tower of Guayaquil =

Clock tower in Guayaquil, Ecuador

- Torre del Reloj
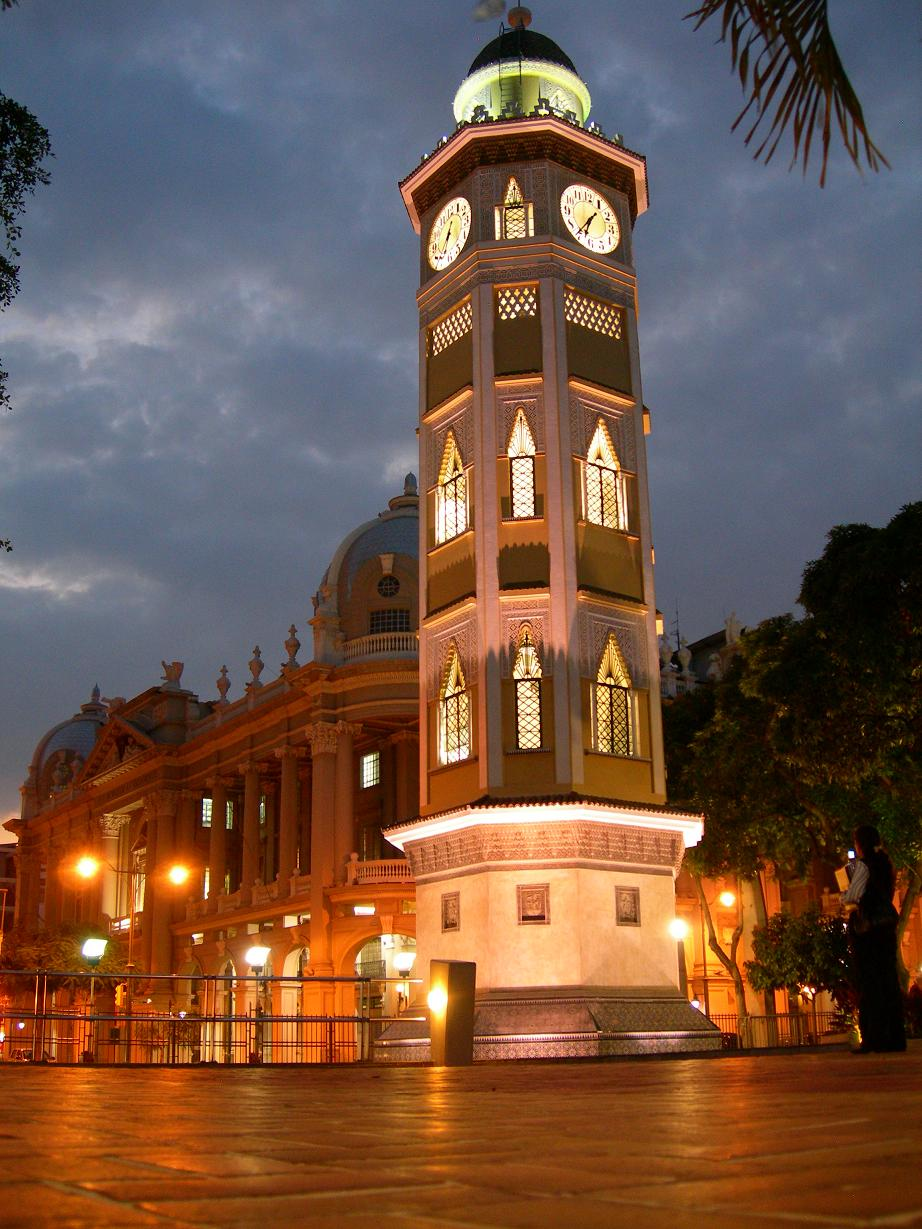
- The tower lit up at night in 2007
- Interactive map of the Clock Tower of Guayaquil area

General information
- Type: Clock tower
- Architectural style: Byzantine
- Location: Malecón 2000, Guayaquil, Ecuador
- Coordinates: 2°11′39″S 79°52′48″W
- Elevation: 23 meters
- Year built: 1930–1931
- Inaugurated: May 24, 1931; 95 years ago
- Renovated: June 3, 2013

Design and construction
- Architect: J. Pérez Nin y Landín
- Engineer: Francisco Ramón
- Other designers: Juan Orús Madinyá

The Clock Tower of Guayaquil (Spanish: Torre del Reloj), also known as the Moorish Tower (Spanish: Torre Morisca), is a structure located in Guayaquil, Ecuador. It has gone through several incarnations before its current form, which ended construction in 1931.

== History ==
In 1842, at the request of Governor Vicente Rocafuerte, the House of Luzárraga loaned 6,000 pesos to the city. The funds were used to acquire an English-made clock to be put in place of the old clock of the Jesuits above the Casa del Cabildo. The clock was initially placed at the top of the tower on Diez de Agosto Street, and it was later moved to the tower of the Guayaquil food market in 1921.

The food market was closed in 1923, and a special tower was built in its place, where the clock remained until 1925. It was moved due to concerns of a lack of security in the construction of the building, with concerns that the building would not be able to support its weight in the long-term. In 1930, Miguel Ángel Garbo, the then-president of the Municipal Council, ordered construction of the Moorish Tower, which began construction in 1930. It was inaugurated on May 24, 1931, at its current location.

=== First clock tower ===
The monastery and school of San Francisco Javier was founded in 1705 by the Society of Jesus. It was extant until 1769, when it complied with an edict by Charles III of Spain from March 27, 1767, which ordered it to depart from the Americas. This was the location of the first clock tower, which had been constructed the mid-18th century by the members of the order.

The tower was dismantled, and later rebuilt by Salvador Sánchez Pareja in 1783. In 1800, Santiago Espantoso bought the Jesuit's building, including its clock and bell. The clock was in continuous operation until 1829.

=== Casa del Cabildo ===
On February 25, 1817, the Casa del Cabildo was inaugurated, where the current municipal building is located. It was made from wood and was attached to the old food market, with which it shared the block. The organization bought the clock from Espantoso for 300 pesos and installed it on the roof of their new building.

Following its transfer to the new building, the old clock did not work properly due to mistakes made during disassembly and reassembly, or because it had suffered damage during its transfer. A shortage of funds led to a lack of work to repair it.

==== New clock ====
In 1837, magistrate Juan de Avilés requested that a new clock be purchased, since the old one was considered out of commission. The funds were initially considered too expensive for purchase, but eventually businessman Manuel Antonio de Luzarraga loaned the money necessary to purchase a clock from England. On September 9, 1842, it was announced that the clock had arrived in Ecuador, and Octobober of that year saw its inauguration.

=== Move to the market ===
Following the Great Fire of Guayaquil, widespread belief that tall buildings encouraged the spread of fires. This led to the removal of the clock and eventual dismantling of the tower on the roof that the clock was held in. In 1905, the clock was moved to a building in the new Mercado de la Orilla. The cabildo building, made out of wood, was heavily dilapidated and was considered to be in ruins, hence why the clock was not kept there. It was destroyed in 1908 for safety.

In 1909, the building was extended by two floors to make the clock more visible from further distances, also creating better acoustics for allowing the chime to be heard better throughout the city. In 1920, it was decided that the clock should be moved. The following year, the council decided to create a standalone site for it on Malecón street. On June 6, 1921, the city government contracted the construction of an iron tower covered in cement in front of Díez de Agosto Avenue.

The project was estimated to cost 10,000 sucres, and was planned to be constructed under architect Nicolás Virgilio Bardellini Seminario. with decoration done by Emilio Soro. The project was formally approved on July 26, but Bardellini died on August 9, upon which it was decided that the hiers to his business would fulfill the project. Construction began on September 22, 1921 and the building was inaugurated on April 25, 1923. This tower was 23.5 meters tall. The structure was eventually disbanded because there had been an error in the calculations and the building would not be structurally sound for a very long time.

== Current location ==
The current clock tower was built from August 1, 1930 and inaugurated on May 24, 1931. In 1930, plans were finalized for construction of the building now known as "Torre Morisca" by engineer Francisco Ramón and the architect J. Pérez Nin y Landín. Later, in 1937, architect Juan Orús Madinyá modified both the interior and exterior with additional ornamentation, which remains today and is an iconic part of the building. The tower was constructed using reinforced concrete and is a four-storied building on an octagonal base of 28 m². It is topped by a Byzantine dome and is 23 meters tall.

On June 3rd, 2013, the clock was repaired by Relojes Olvera III Generación, a Mexican company from Zacatlán. The bell was repaired to correctly ring every hour as well. Since June 2023, the clock is open to the public 10:00 AM to 5:00 PM Thursday through Sunday.

== See also ==
- El Cuentero de Muisne
