= Project Big Ben =

1944 British project to find and investigate a captured V2 rocket

"Big Ben" was the World War II code name for the British project to reconstruct and evaluate captured German missiles such as the V-2 rocket. On 31 July 1944, after the UK agreed to exchange Supermarine Spitfires for the wreckage of a V-2 in Sweden during World War II, experts at Farnborough began an attempt to reconstruct the missile.

In late July 1944, Operation Most III the Polish resistance movement (Armia Krajowa) succeeded in capturing an intact V2 rocket near the Pustkow Testing Centre. It had been launched for a test flight, failed but did not explode and then retrieved still intact from the Bug River, and transferred secretly to London.

== See also ==
- V-1 and V-2 Intelligence
- Home Army and V1 and V2 — Polish resistance efforts.
- Operation Crossbow
- Operation Hydra (1943)
