= Clock Tower Square =

Town center of Thimphu, Bhutan

Coordinates: 27.4703°N 89.6397°E

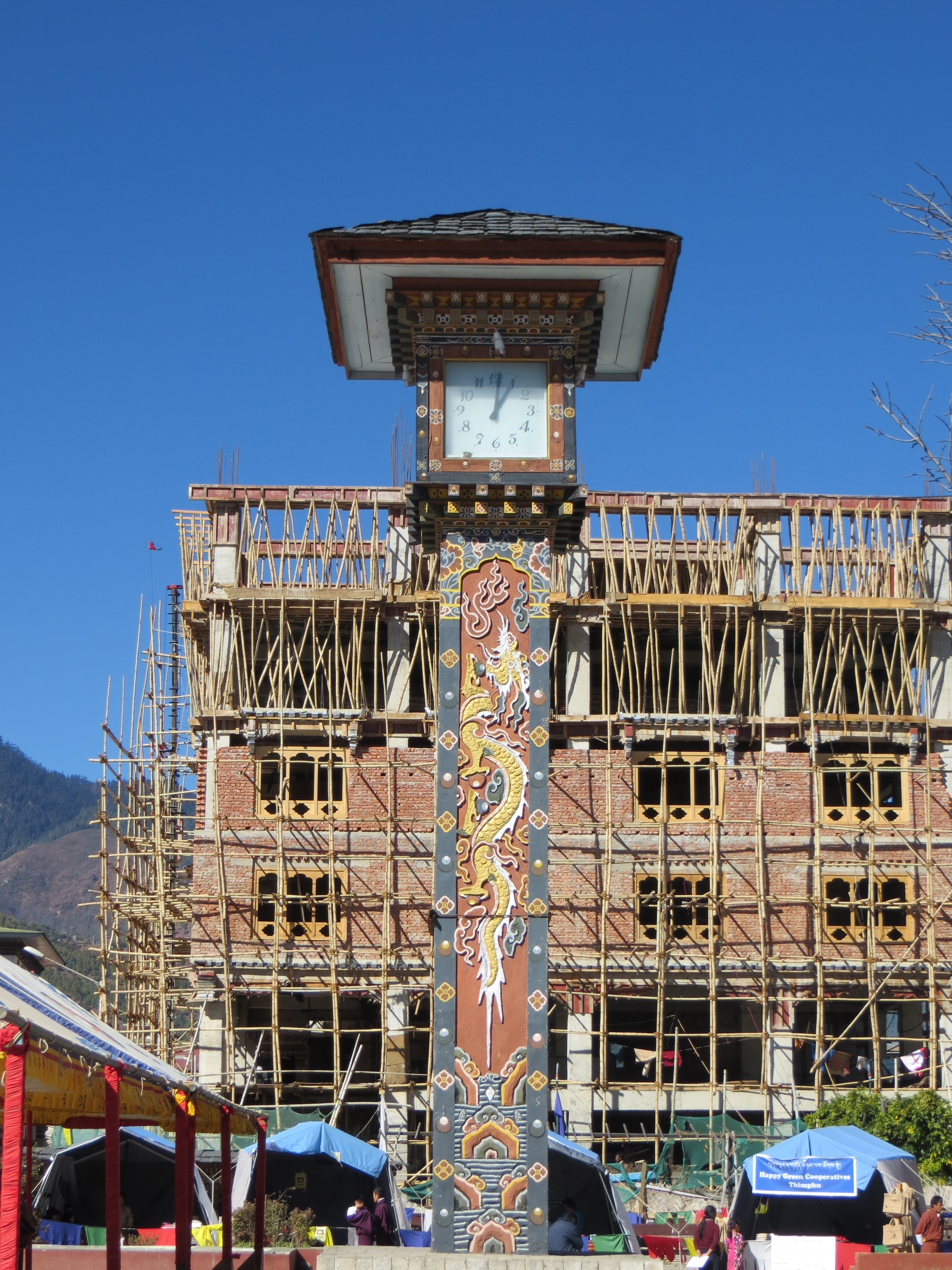
The clock tower

Clock Tower Square is a square in Thimphu, Bhutan, and is the site of the famous tower with four clock faces. There are also many shops, hotels and restaurants surrounding the square.

== Location ==
The Clock Tower Square is located below Norzin Lam, Thimphu above the national football stadium in the heart of the capital.

== Architecture ==
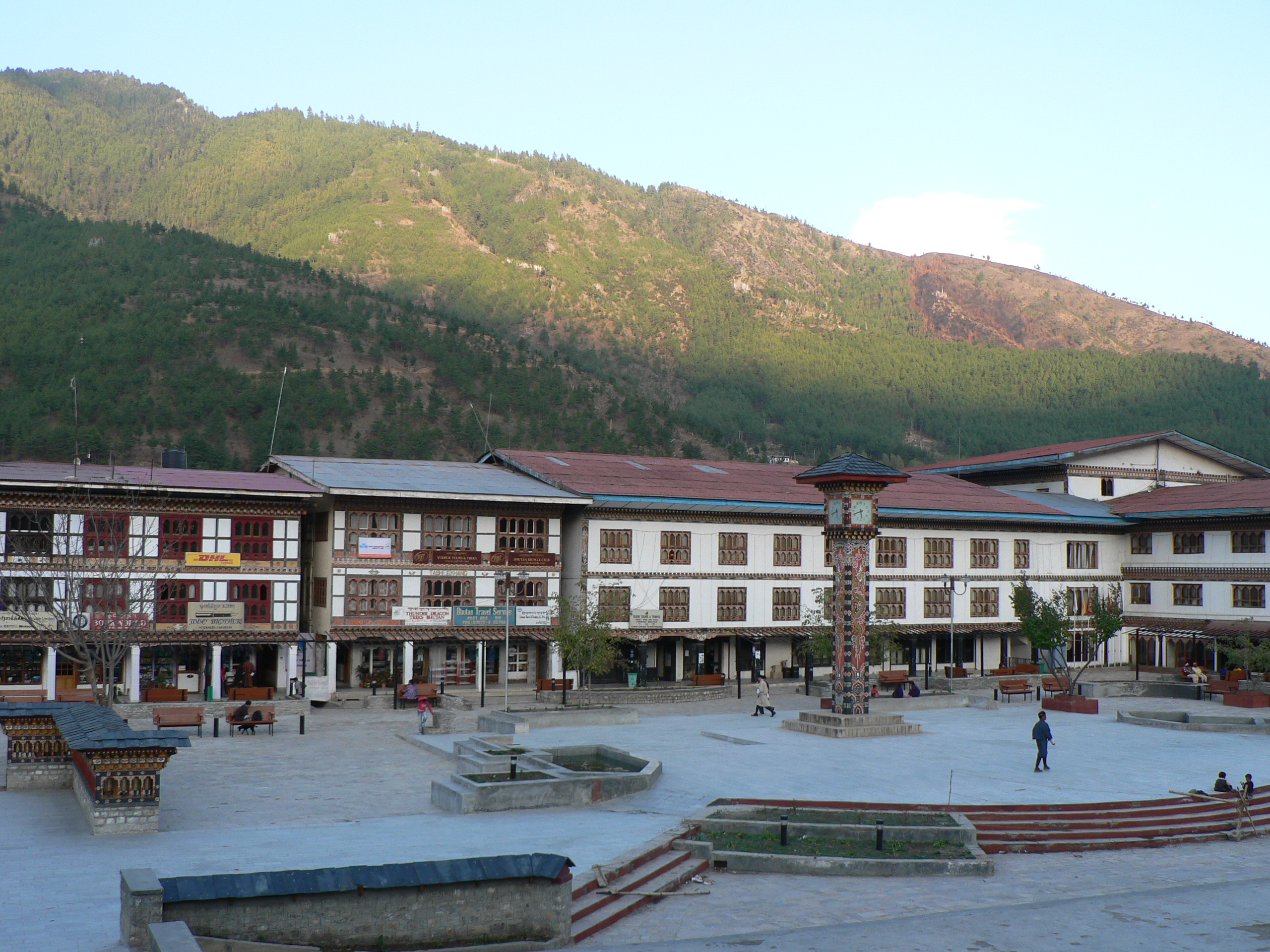
Clock Tower square, Norzin Lam, Thimphu

The Clock-tower has a typical Bhutanese architectural outlook with rich Bhutanese carvings and paintings. There are traditional hand crafted dragons with golden paintings on all four faces of the tower which symbolizes the county as an independent dragon kingdom. The tower has beautiful paintings and carvings of flowers which add more magnificence to the tower. The shops, restaurants and hotels in the clock tower square have a blend of fine traditional and modern architectural Bhutanese design with multi-coloured wood frontages, small arched windows, and sloping roofs. The buildings around the square are all small three-storied structures.

== Other attractions ==
Water fountains and traditional Bhutanese Mani Lhalhor (prayer wheels) make the place an ideal location to catch up with Thimphu. Prayer wheels are seen almost everywhere around the country which is a Bhutanese way of life and belief that turning them brings good luck. The square often serves as a platform for various events and activities such as fund-raising events, movie award ceremonies, trade fairs, live musical shows and many more. There is also a small playground opposite to the tower where kids can play. The square has even played host to the Indo-Bhutan friendship car rally.
