= Camalaú =

Municipality in Paraíba, Brazil

- Municipality
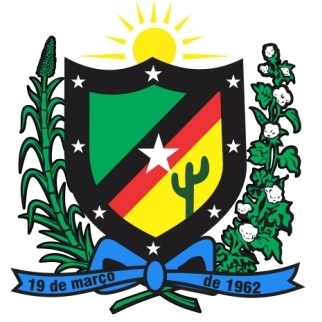
- Flag Coat of arms

- Location of Camalaú within the state of Paraíba
- Coordinates: 7°53′11″S 36°49′30″W
- Country: Brazil
- Region: Northeast
- State: Paraíba
- Mesoregion: Borborema
- Microregion: Cariri Ocidental
- Incorporated: March 19, 1962

Government
  - Type: Council-Manager
  - Mayor: Aristeu Chaves

Population (2020)
  - Total: 6,031
  - Density: 9.1/km^{2} (24/sq mi)
- Time zone: UTC−3 (BRT)

Camalaú (Central northeastern portuguese pronunciation: [kɐmɐlɐˈuˑ]) is a municipality in the state of Paraíba (Brazil) in the mesoregion of Borborema and the West Cariri microregion. In 2020, it had an estimated population of 6,031. It has an area of 603 km^{2}.

== History ==
The village was founded on June 21, 1895, when Domingos Ferreira Brito and his wife Rosa Maria da Conceição officially donated more than sixteen hectares of land to the Catholic Church in order to found the Hermitage of San Jose. They did so on the instigation of Jose Cardoso da Silva, who is now considered the founder of the city. On March 19, 1962, Camalaú officially became a city.

The name is of indigenous origin. It may have been the name of the leader of a group of indigenous inhabitants who lived in the vicinity of where the city is now located. Alternatively, it may simply have been the name of the area where they resided.

Another theory holds that the name is a corruption of a Tupi phrase.

== Location ==
Located in West Cariri, Camalaú borders on the state of Pernambuco. Nearby cities are: São João do Tigre (22 km), São Sebastião do Umbuzeiro (37 km), Monteiro (35 km), Sumé (26 km), and Congo (20 km). The distance to the capital is 331.7 km

Camalaú's temperature averages around 25 °C.

== Rivers ==
The municipality of Camalaú is on the Sierra and Paraíba rivers. There is a weir and a dam. Some other important streams include Raposa, Ipueira, Aguazinha, Craibeira, Lamarão, and Pinheiro.
