= 20000 Varuna =

Large trans-neptunian object

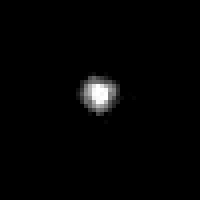
- Hubble Space Telescope image of Varuna, taken in 2005

Discovery
- Discovered by: Spacewatch (Robert McMillan)
- Discovery date: 28 November 2000

Designations
- Pronunciation: /ˈværənə/ VARR-ə-nə; Sanskrit वरुण [ˈʋɐɾuɳɐ]
- Named after: Varuna
- Alternative designations: 2000 WR_{106}
- Minor planet category: TNO · classical (hot); Scat-Ext
- Adjectives: Varunian /vəˈruːniən/
- Symbol: (astrological)

Orbital characteristics
- Epoch 2025-05-05 (JD 2460800.5)
- Uncertainty parameter 0
- Observation arc: 70.28 yr (25,670 days)
- Earliest precovery date: 24 November 1954
- Aphelion: 45.448 AU (6.7989 Tm)
- Perihelion: 40.827 AU (6.1076 Tm)
- Semi-major axis: 42.718 AU (6.3905 Tm)
- Eccentricity: 0.0536
- Orbital period (sidereal): 279.21 yr (101,980 d)
- Average orbital speed: 4.53 km/s
- Mean anomaly: 114.900°
- Mean motion: 0° 0^{m} 12.523^{s} / day
- Inclination: 17.140°
- Longitude of ascending node: 97.213°
- Time of perihelion: 1932-Mar-29
- Argument of perihelion: 272.579°
- Known satellites: 0 (1 suspected)
- Neptune MOID: 12.040 AU (1.8012 Tm)

Physical characteristics
- Mean diameter: 654+154 −102 km 668+154 −86 km
- Mean density: 0.992+0.086 −0.015 g/cm^{3}
- Synodic rotation period: 6.343572±0.000006 h
- Geometric albedo: 0.127+0.04 −0.042
- Spectral type: IR (moderately red); B−V=0.88±0.02; V−R=0.62±0.01; V−I=1.24±0.01
- Apparent magnitude: 20.3 (opposition)
- Absolute magnitude (H): 3.79; 3.83 (V-band)

20000 Varuna (Note: With stress on the first syllable) (provisional designation 2000 WR_{106}) is a large trans-Neptunian object in the Kuiper belt. It was discovered in November 2000 by American astronomer Robert McMillan during a Spacewatch survey at the Kitt Peak National Observatory. It is named after the Hindu deity Varuna, one of the oldest deities mentioned in the Vedic texts.

Varuna's light curve is compatible with the body being a Jacobi ellipsoid, suggesting that it has an elongated shape due to its rapid rotation. Varuna's surface is moderately red in color due to the presence of complex organic compounds on its surface. Water ice is also present on its surface, and is thought to have been exposed by past collisions which may have also caused Varuna's rapid rotation. Although no natural satellites have been found or directly imaged around Varuna, analysis of variations in its light curve in 2019 suggests the presence of a possible satellite orbiting closely around Varuna. Assumptions that the body is in hydrostatic equilibrium (and thus a dwarf planet) result in a calculated density so low that it is likely not a dwarf planet anyway.

== History ==
=== Discovery ===
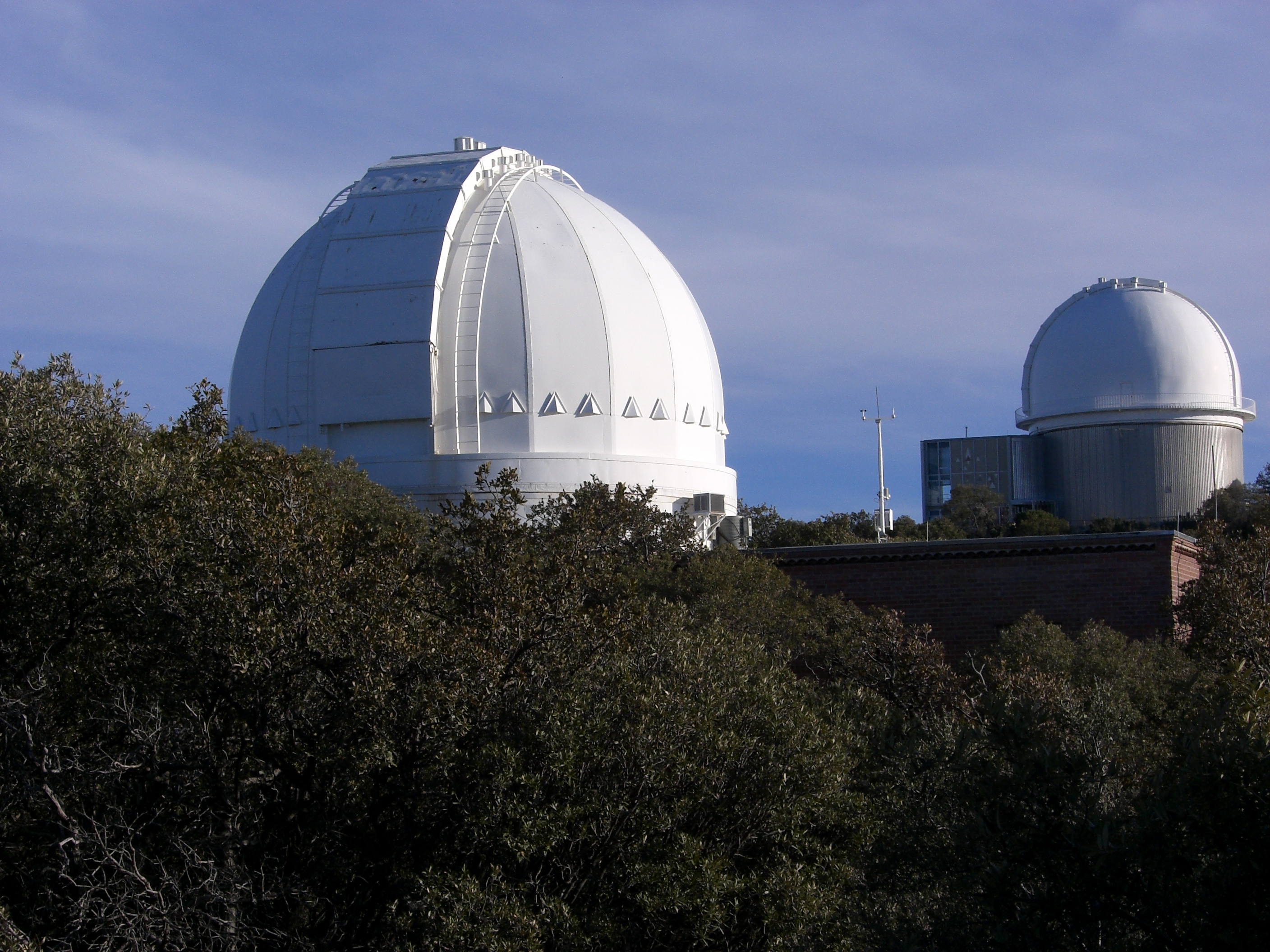
Varuna was discovered with the Spacewatch 0.9-meter telescope at the Kitt Peak National Observatory.

Varuna was discovered by American astronomer Robert McMillan using the Spacewatch 0.9-meter telescope during a routine survey on 28 November 2000. The Spacewatch survey was conducted by McMillan at the Kitt Peak National Observatory near Tucson, Arizona. At the time of discovery, Varuna was located at a moderately dense star field close to the northern galactic equator. Although Varuna was not detected by McMillan's real-time computer software, he was able to identify Varuna moving slowly among the background stars by manually comparing multiple scans of the same region using the blinking technique. After McMillan's observing shift, follow-up observations of Varuna were conducted by astronomer Jeffrey Larsen in order to confirm the object. By the end of Larsen's observing shift, both McMillan and Larsen had made a total of 12 observations that spanned three nights.

The discovery of Varuna was formally announced in a Minor Planet Electronic Circular on 1 December 2000. It was given the provisional designation 2000 WR_{106}, indicating that it was discovered during the second half of November 2000. Varuna was the 2667th object observed in the latter half of November, as indicated by the last letter and numbers in its provisional designation. At the time, Varuna was thought to be one of the largest and brightest minor planets in the Solar System due to its relatively high apparent magnitude of 20 for a distant object, which implied that it might be around one-fourth the size of Pluto and comparable in size to the dwarf planet Ceres.

Subsequently, after the announcement of Varuna's discovery, precovery images of Varuna were found by German astronomers Andre Knofel and Reiner Stoss at the Palomar Observatory. One particular precovery image, which was taken with the Palomar Observatory's Big Schmidt telescope in 1955, showed that Varuna was located three degrees away from its extrapolated location based on the approximate circular orbit determined in December 2000. The oldest known precovery image of Varuna was taken on 24 November 1954. These precovery images along with additional observations from Japan, Hawaii, and Arizona helped astronomers refine its orbit and determine Varuna's proper classification.

In January 2001, Varuna was assigned the minor planet number 20000 by the Minor Planet Center as its orbit was well determined from precovery images and subsequent observations. The minor planet number 20000 was particularly chosen to commemorate Varuna's large size, being the largest classical Kuiper belt object known at that time and was believed to be as large as Ceres. The number 20000 was also chosen to commemorate the coincidental 200th anniversary of the discovery of Ceres, which occurred in the same month as the numbering of Varuna.

=== Name ===
Varuna is named after the eponymous Hindu deity Varuna, following the International Astronomical Union naming convention for non-resonant Kuiper belt objects after creator deities. The name was proposed by Indian choreographer Mrinalini Sarabhai, and was approved by the IAU in March 2001. Varuna is one of the oldest Vedic deities of Hindu literature, being mentioned in the earliest hymns of the Rigveda. In Hindu literature, Varuna created and presided over the waters of the heaven and of the ocean. Varuna is the king of gods and men and the universe, and has unlimited knowledge.

Planetary symbols are no longer much used in astronomy, so Varuna never received a symbol in the astronomical literature. There is no standard symbol for Varuna used by astrologers either. Denis Moskowitz, a software engineer in Massachusetts who designed the symbols for most of the dwarf planets, proposed a symbol for Varuna: it derives from the Devanagari letter va व and Varuna's snake-lasso. This symbol is occasionally mentioned on astrology websites, but is not broadly used. Another sometimes seen is a variant of Neptune ( with a globe and outward-facing tines), as Varuna is the Hindu equivalent of Neptune.

== Orbit and classification ==
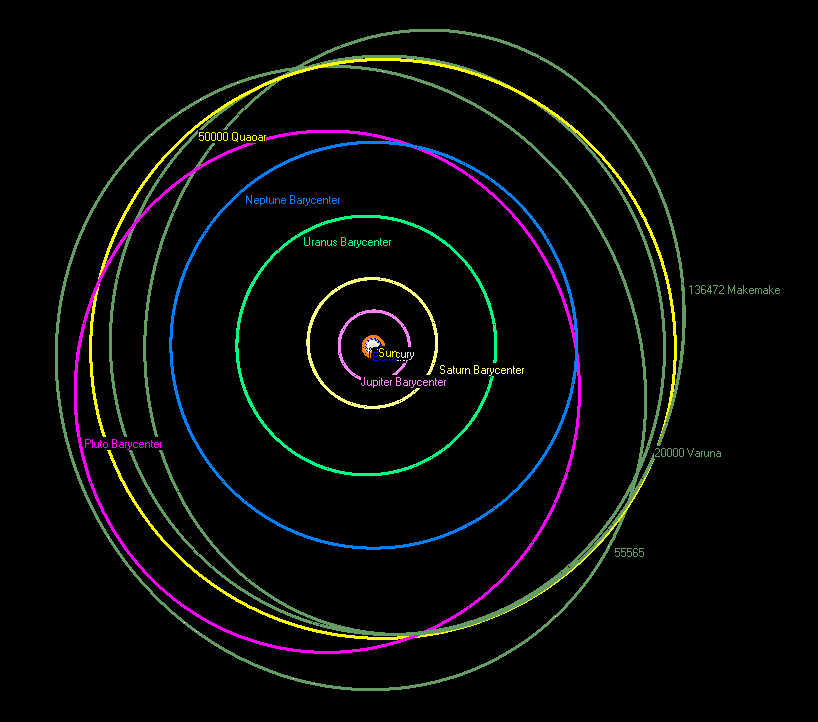
Polar and ecliptic view of the orbits of Varuna (blue), Pluto (red), and Neptune (white). The orbital inclinations of Varuna and Pluto as shown in the ecliptic view are similar. The image on the right shows the orbits of several other large Kuiper belt objects including Pluto.

Varuna orbits the Sun at an average distance of 42.7 AU (6.39 billion km; 3.97 billion mi), taking 279 years to complete a full orbit. Its orbit is nearly circular, with a low orbital eccentricity of 0.056. Due to its low orbital eccentricity, its distance from the Sun varies only slightly over the course of its orbit. Varuna's minimum distance possible (MOID) from Neptune is 12.04 AU. Over the course of its orbit, Varuna's distance from the Sun ranges from 40.3 AU at perihelion (closest distance) to 45.1 AU at aphelion (farthest distance). Varuna's orbit is inclined to the ecliptic by 17 degrees, similar to Pluto's orbital inclination. Varuna passed perihelion in 1932 and is currently moving away from the Sun, and will pass aphelion in 2073.

With a nearly circular orbit at around 40 to 50 AU, Varuna is classified as a classical Kuiper belt object (KBO), or sometimes a "cubewano". Varuna's semi-major axis of 42.8 AU is similar to that of other large classical KBOs such as Quaoar (a=43.7 AU) and Makemake (a=45.6 AU), although other orbital characteristics such as inclination widely differ. Varuna is a member of the "dynamically hot" class of classical KBOs, meaning that it has an orbital inclination greater than 4 degrees, the imposed maximum inclination for dynamically cold members of its population. As a classical KBO, Varuna is not in orbital resonance with Neptune and is also free from any significant perturbation by Neptune.

== Rotation ==
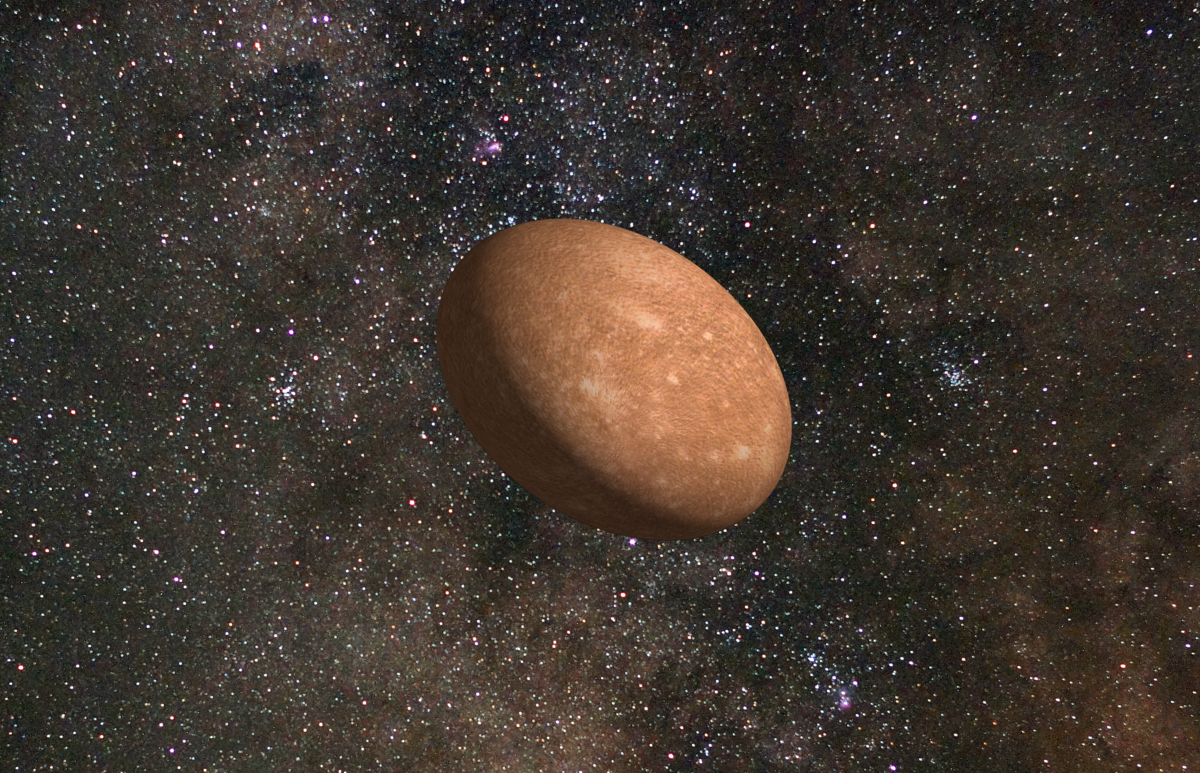
Art concept of Varuna, incorporating some of what is known including its shape and coloration from spectral analysis.

Varuna has a rapid rotation period of approximately 6.34 hours, derived from a double-peaked solution for Varuna's rotational light curve. Varuna's rotation was first measured January 2001 by astronomer Tony Farnham using the McDonald Observatory's 2.1-meter telescope, as part of a study on the rotation and colors of distant objects. CCD photometry of Varuna's light curve in 2001 revealed that it displays large brightness variations with an amplitude of about 0.5 magnitudes. The measured rotational light curve of Varuna provided two ambiguous rotation periods of 3.17 and 6.34 hours, for a single-peaked and a double-peaked solution, respectively. Additional possible rotation periods of 2.79 and 3.66 hours were also obtained by Farnham, although these values could not be ruled out at the time.

A single-peaked interpretation of Varuna's rotational light curve (3.17 h) would assume a spherical shape for Varuna, with albedo features on its surface that would account for its brightness variations. However, in order for this interpretation to be valid, Varuna must have a density much greater than 1 g/cm^{3} (roughly the density of water), otherwise it would deform and break apart as the given rotation period exceeds the critical rotation rate of ~3.3 hours for a body with a density of 1 g/cm^{3}. A double-peaked interpretation of Varuna's rotational light curve (6.34 h) would assume that Varuna's shape is an elongated ellipsoid, with an estimated a/b aspect ratio of 1.5–1.6. The rotational light curve of Varuna was later investigated by astronomers David C. Jewitt and Scott Sheppard during February and April 2001, and concluded that the double-peaked interpretation for Varuna's light curve is the most plausible solution due to the absence of rotational variation in Varuna's color in the visible spectrum.

Examination of past photometric observations of Varuna's light curve has shown that its light curve amplitude had increased by roughly 0.13 magnitudes from 2001 to 2019. This increase in amplitude is due to the combined effects of Varuna's ellipsoidal shape, rotation, and varying phase angle. Geometric models for Varuna's changing amplitude have provided several possible solutions for the orientation of Varuna's rotational poles in ecliptic coordinates, with the best-fit solution adopting a spin axis right ascension and declination of 54° and −65°, respectively. (Note: The given right ascension and declination values specify the position of an object in the geocentric equatorial coordinate system. The right ascension is the angular distance eastward of the celestial equator starting at the vernal (March) equinox while the declination is the angular distance perpendicular or vertical to the celestial equator.) The best-fit pole orientation of Varuna implies that it is being viewed at a near-edge on configuration, in which Varuna's equator nearly faces directly toward Earth. (Note: Varuna's north pole points in the direction of RA = 54° and Dec = −65°, meaning that pole's right ascension points nearly perpendicular to the vernal equinox (resulting in an edge-on view of Varuna's equator) and the negative declination indicating that Varuna's north pole points downwards, 65° south of the celestial equator.)

Varuna's rapid rotation is believed to have resulted from disruptive collisions that have sped up its rotation during the formation of the Solar System. The present collision rate in the trans-Neptunian region is minimal, though collisions were more frequent during the formation of the Solar System. However, Jewitt and Sheppard calculated that the rate of disruptive collisions among large trans-Neptunian objects (TNOs) during the Solar System's formation is extremely uncommon, contradictory to the current abundance of binary and rapidly rotating TNOs that are believed to have originated from such collisions. To explain the abundance of binary and rapidly rotating TNOs, the rate of collisions among TNOs had likely increased as a result of Neptune's outward migration perturbing the orbits of TNOs, thus increasing the frequency of collisions which may have led to Varuna's rapid rotation.

== Physical characteristics ==
=== Size and shape ===
Size estimates for Varuna
Year	Diameter (km)	Method	Refs
2000	900+129 −145	thermal	
2002	1060+180 −220	thermal	
2002	~788	best fit albedo	
2005	936+238 −324	thermal	
2005	600±150	thermal	
2005	586+129 −190	thermal	
2007	502+64.0 −69.5 or 412.3~718.2 or ≤744.1	thermal (Spitzer 1-Band)	
2007	>621+178.1 −139.1	thermal (Spitzer 2-Band)	
2007	500±100	thermal (adopted)	
2008	714+178 −128	thermal	
2010	1003±9 (long-axis minimum only)	occultation	
2013	668+154 −86	thermal	
2013	~816	best fit albedo	
2013	~686	occultation	
2014	~670 (minimum)	occultation	
2019	654+154 −102	thermal	

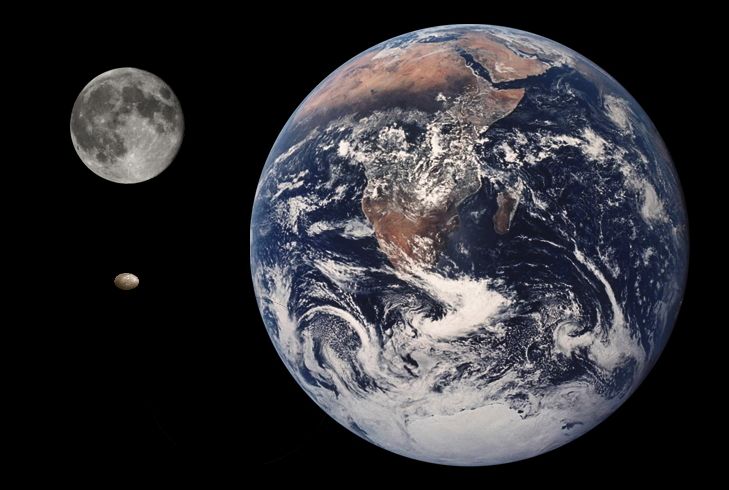
Varuna compared to the Earth and the Moon

As a result of its rapid rotation, the shape of Varuna is deformed into a triaxial ellipsoid. Given the rapid rotation, rare for objects so large, Varuna's shape is described as a Jacobi ellipsoid, with an a/b aspect ratio of around 1.5–1.6 (in which Varuna's longest semi-axis a is 1.5–1.6 times longer than its b semi-axis). Examination of Varuna's light curve has found that the best-fit model for Varuna's shape is a triaxial ellipsoid with the semi-axes a, b, and c in ratios in the range of b/a = 0.63–0.80, and c/a = 0.45–0.52.

Due to Varuna's ellipsoidal shape, multiple observations have provided different estimates for its diameter, ranging from 500–1,000 km (310–620 mi). Most diameter estimates for Varuna were determined by measuring its thermal emission, although size estimates have been constrained to smaller values as a result of higher albedos determined by space-based thermal measurements. Observations of stellar occultations by Varuna have also provided varying size estimates. An occultation by Varuna in February 2010 yielded a chord length of 1,003 km (623 mi), inferred to be across its longest axis. Later occultations in 2013 and 2014 yielded mean diameters of 686 km (426 mi) and 670 km (420 mi) respectively.

Since the discovery of Varuna, Haumea, another larger rapidly rotating (3.9 h) object over twice the size of Varuna, (Note: Haumea's dimensions are 2322 km × 1704 km × 1026 km, with 2322 km being the longest semi-axis. In comparison, Varuna's longest semi-axis is 1003 km, less than half than that of Haumea. In fact, Haumea's polar semi-axis of 1026 km is also over twice as long as Varuna's, which has a polar semi-axis around 400–500 km based on apparent oblateness values from occultations in 2010 and 2013.) has been discovered and is also thought to have an elongated shape, albeit slightly less pronounced (estimated ratios of b/a = 0.76~0.88, and c/a = 0.50~0.55, possibly due to a higher estimated density approximately 1.757–1.965 g/cm^{3}).

==== Status as a dwarf planet uncertain ====
Astronomer Gonzalo Tancredi considered Varuna likely to be a dwarf planet and a Jacobi ellipsoid in shape. Based on a best-fit Jacobi ellipsoid model for Varuna, Lacerda and Jewitt estimate that Varuna has a quite low density, of 0.992 g/cm^{3}, just under Tancredi's minimum density criterion. Despite this, they assumed Varuna was in hydrostatic equilibrium for their calculations. Astronomer William Grundy and colleagues propose that dark, low-density TNOs around the size range of approximately 400–1,000 km (250–620 mi) are likely to be uncompressed, partially porous bodies. While the larger objects in this range, such as Varuna, may have fully collapsed into solid material in their interiors, their mantles likely remain uncompressed. That is, they would not be in hydrostatic equilibrium and not dwarf planets.

==== Thermal measurements ====
Ground observations of Varuna's thermal emission from 2000 to 2005 yielded large diameter estimates ranging from 900 km (560 mi) to 1,060 km (660 mi), making it comparable to the size of Ceres. Contrary to the ground-based estimates, space-based thermal observations from the Spitzer Space Telescope provided a smaller diameter range of 450–750 km (280–470 mi). The discrepancy between ground-based and space-based size estimates are due to the limited observable wavelengths for ground-based observations, as a result of absorption of Earth's atmosphere. Distant trans-Neptunian objects such as Varuna intrinsically emit thermal radiation at longer wavelengths due to their low temperatures. However, at long wavelengths, thermal radiation cannot pass through Earth's atmosphere and ground-based observations could only measure weak thermal emissions from Varuna at near-infrared and submillimeter wavelengths, hindering the accuracy of ground-based thermal measurements.

Space-based observations provided more accurate thermal measurements as they are able to measure thermal emissions at a broad range of wavelengths that are normally interfered by Earth's atmosphere. Preliminary thermal measurements with Spitzer in 2005 provided a higher albedo constraint of 0.12 to 0.3, corresponding to a smaller diameter constraint of 450–750 km (280–470 mi). Further Spitzer thermal measurements at multiple wavelength ranges (bands) in 2007 yielded mean diameter estimates around ~502 km and ~621 km for a single-band and two-band solution for the data, respectively. From these results, the adopted mean diameter was 500 km (310 mi). Follow-up multi-band thermal observations from the Herschel Space Observatory in 2013 yielded a mean diameter of 668+154
−86 km, consistent with previous constraints on Varuna's diameter.

==== Occultations ====
Previous attempted observations of stellar occultations by Varuna in 2005 and 2008 were unsuccessful due to uncertainties in Varuna's proper motion along with undesirable conditions for observing. In 2010, an occultation by Varuna was successfully observed by a team of astronomers led by Bruno Sicardy on the night of 19 February. The occultation was observed from various regions in southern Africa and north-eastern Brazil. Although observations of the occultation from South Africa and Namibia had negative results, observations from Brazil, particularly at São Luís in Maranhão, successfully detected a 52.5-second occultation by Varuna of an 11.1 magnitude star. The occultation yielded a chord length of 1003±9 km, quite large compared to mean diameter estimates from thermal measurements. Because the occultation occurred near Varuna's maximum brightness, the occultation was observing the maximum apparent surface area for an ellipsoidal shape; the longest axis of Varuna's shape was observed during the occultation. São Luís was also located very close to the predicted centerline of Varuna's shadow path, meaning the chord length was close to the longest measurable during the event, closely constraining the possible maximum equatorial diameter.

Results from the same event from Camalaú, Paraíba, approximately 450 km (280 mi) south (and on what was predicted to be the very southern extent of the shadow path), showed a 28-second occultation, corresponding to an approximately 535 km (332 mi) chord, much longer than might otherwise have been expected. However, Quixadá, 255 km (158 mi) south of São Luís–between it and Camalaú–paradoxically had a negative result. To account for the negative Quixadá results, the apparent oblateness (flattening) of Varuna was imposed at a minimum value of approximately 0.56 (aspect ratio c/a ≤ 0.44), corresponding to a minimum polar dimension of approximately 441.3 km (274.2 mi), based on the given chord length of 1003±9 km. (Note: Polar dimension calculated by multiplying the chord 1003±9 km with the c/a ratio of 0.44, calculated from 1 – 0.56, the maximum oblateness imposed by Braga-Ribas et al. in 2014.) The resulting lower bound on Varuna's polar dimension is approximately equal to Lacerda and Jewitt's lower bound c/a aspect ratio of 0.45, which they previously calculated in 2007. A preliminary conference presentation, given before the Camalaú results were fully analyzed, concluded that the São Luís and Quixadá results together suggested a significantly elongated shape is required for Varuna.

Later occultations in 2013 and 2014 yielded mean diameters of 686 km (426 mi) and 670 km (420 mi), respectively. The mean diameter of 678 km (421 mi), calculated from both chords from the occultations, (Note: The mean diameter of ≈678 km is calculated as the average diameter of the 2013 and 2014 occultation chords of ~686 km and ≈670 km, respectively.) appears seemingly consistent with the Spitzer and Herschel thermal measurement of 668 km (415 mi). While the apparent oblateness of Varuna could not be determined from the single chord obtained from the 2014 occultation, the 2013 occultation yielded two chords, corresponding to an apparent oblateness of approximately 0.29. The imposed oblateness for the 2013 chord length of 686 km as Varuna's diameter corresponds to a polar dimension of approximately 487 km (303 mi), (Note: Polar dimension calculated by multiplying the 2013 chord 686 km with the c/a ratio of 0.71, calculated from 1 – 0.29, the apparent oblateness imposed by Braga-Ribas et al. in 2014.) somewhat consistent with the calculated 2010 minimum polar dimension of 441.3 km.

=== Spectra and surface ===
Comparison of sizes, albedo, and colors of various large trans-Neptunian objects. The gray arcs represent uncertainties of the object's size.

Varuna's spectrum was first analyzed in early 2001 with the Near Infrared Camera Spectrometer (NICS) at the Galileo National Telescope in Spain. Spectral observations of Varuna at near-infrared wavelengths revealed that the surface of Varuna is moderately red and displays a red spectral slope between the wavelength range of 0.9 and 1.8 μm. Varuna's spectrum also exhibits strong absorption bands at wavelengths of 1.5 and 2 μm, indicating the presence of water ice on its surface.

The red color of Varuna's surface results from the photolysis of organic compounds being irradiated by sunlight and cosmic rays. The irradiation of organic compounds such as methane on Varuna's surface produces tholins, which are known to reduce its surface reflectivity (albedo) and are expected to cause its spectrum to appear featureless. Compared to Huya, which was observed along with Varuna in 2001, it appears less red and displays more apparent water ice absorption bands, suggesting that Varuna's surface is relatively fresh and had maintained some of its original material in its surface. The fresh appearance of Varuna's surface may have resulted from collisions that have exposed fresh water ice beneath Varuna's layer of tholins above its surface.

Another study of Varuna's spectra at near-infrared wavelengths in 2008 yielded a featureless spectrum with a blue spectral slope, contrary to earlier results in 2001. The spectra obtained in 2008 showed no clear indication of water ice, contradictory to the 2001 results. The discrepancy between the two results was interpreted as an indication of surface variation on Varuna, though this possibility was later ruled out by a 2014 study of Varuna's spectra. The 2014 results closely matched the previous spectra obtained in 2001, implying that the featureless spectra obtained in 2008 is likely erroneous.

Models for Varuna's spectrum suggest that its surface is most likely formed of a mixture of amorphous silicates (25%), complex organic compounds (35%), amorphous carbon (15%) and water ice (25%), with a possibility of up to 10% methane ice. For an object with a size similar to Varuna, the presence of volatile methane could not be primordial as Varuna is not massive enough to retain volatiles on its surface. An event that had occurred subsequently after Varuna's formation–such as an energetic impact–would likely account for the presence of methane on Varuna's surface. Additional near-infrared observations of Varuna's spectra were conducted at the NASA Infrared Telescope Facility in 2017 and have identified absorption features between 2.2 and 2.5 μm that might be associated with ethane and ethylene, based on preliminary analysis. For mid-sized bodies such as Varuna, volatiles such as ethane and ethylene are more likely to be retained than lighter volatiles such as methane according to volatile retention theories formulated by astronomers Schaller and Brown in 2007.

==== Brightness ====
Varuna's apparent magnitude, its brightness as seen from Earth, varies from 19.5 to 20 magnitude. At opposition, its apparent magnitude can reach up 20.3 magnitudes. Combined thermal measurements from the Spitzer Space Telescope and the Herschel Space Observatory in 2013 obtained a visual absolute magnitude (H_{V}) of 3.76, comparable to that of the similarly-sized Kuiper belt object Ixion (H_{V}=3.83). Varuna is among the twenty brightest trans-Neptunian objects known, despite the Minor Planet Center assuming an absolute magnitude of 3.6.

The surface of Varuna is dark, with a measured geometric albedo of 0.127 based on thermal observations in 2013. Varuna's geometric albedo is similar to that of the possible dwarf planet Quaoar, which has a geometric albedo of 0.124. Varuna was initially thought to have a much lower geometric albedo, as early ground observations of Varuna's thermal emissions from 2000 to 2005 estimated albedo values ranging from 0.04 to 0.07, around eight times darker than Pluto's albedo. Later thermal measurements of Varuna with space-based telescopes refuted these previous albedo measurements: Spitzer measured a higher geometric albedo of 0.116 while further thermal measurements from Spitzer and Herschel in 2013 estimated a geometric albedo of 0.127.

Photometric observations of Varuna in 2004 and 2005 were carried out to observe changes in Varuna's light curve caused by opposition surges when the phase angle of Varuna approaches zero degrees at opposition. The photometry results showed that Varuna's light curve amplitude had decreased to 0.2 magnitudes at opposition, less than its overall amplitude of 0.42 magnitudes. The photometry results also showed an increase in asymmetry of Varuna's light curve near opposition, indicating variations of scattering properties over its surface. The opposition surge of Varuna differs from those of dark asteroids, which gradually becomes more pronounced near opposition in contrast to Varuna's narrow opposition surge, in which its light curve amplitude sharply changes within a phase angle of 0.5 degrees. The opposition surges of other Solar System bodies with moderate albedos behave similarly to Varuna, indirectly suggesting that Varuna might have a higher albedo in contrast to ground-based albedo estimates. This implication of a higher albedo for Varuna was confirmed in subsequent thermal measurements from Spitzer and Herschel.

=== Internal structure ===
Varuna is estimated to have a bulk density of 0.992 g/cm^{3}, marginally less than that of water (1 g/cm^{3}). Varuna's low bulk density is likely due to a porous internal structure composed of a nearly proportional ratio of water ice and rock. To explain its porous internal structure and composition, Lacerda and Jewitt suggested that Varuna may have a granular internal structure. Varuna's granular internal structure is thought to have resulted from fractures caused by past collisions likely responsible for its rapid rotation. Other objects including Saturn's moons Tethys and Iapetus are also known to have a similarly low density, with a porous internal structure and a composition that is predominantly water ice and rock. William Grundy and colleagues proposed that dark, low-density TNOs around the size range of approximately 400–1,000 km (250–620 mi) are transitional between smaller, porous (and thus low-density) bodies and larger, denser, brighter and geologically differentiated planetary bodies (such as dwarf planets). The internal structures of low-density TNOs, such as Varuna, had only partially differentiated, as their likely rocky interiors had not reached sufficient temperatures to melt and collapse into pore spaces since formation. As a result, most mid-sized TNOs had remained internally porous, thus resulting in low densities. In this case, Varuna may not be in hydrostatic equilibrium.

== Possible satellite ==
Photometric observations of Varuna's light curve, led by Valenzuela and colleagues in 2019, indicate that a possible satellite might be orbiting Varuna at a close distance. By using the Fourier analysis method of combining four separate light curves obtained in 2019, they derived a lower-quality light-curve amplitude with a greater amount of residuals. Their result indicated that Varuna's light curve experiences subtle changes over time. They plotted the residuals of the combined light curve in a Lomb periodogram and derived an orbital period of 11.9819 hours for the possible satellite. The satellite varies in brightness by 0.04 magnitudes as it orbits Varuna. Under the assumption that Varuna's density is 1.1 g/cm^{3} and the satellite is tidally locked, the team estimates that it orbits Varuna at a distance of 1,300–2,000 km (810–1,240 mi), just beyond the estimated Roche limit of Varuna (~1000 km). Due to the satellite's close proximity to Varuna, it is not yet possible to resolve it with space-based telescopes such as the Hubble Space Telescope as the angular distance between Varuna and the satellite is smaller than the resolution of current space-based telescopes. Although direct observations of Varuna's satellite are unfeasible with current telescopes, Varuna's equator is being directly viewed at an edge-on configuration, implying that mutual events between the satellite and Varuna could possibly occur in the future.

== Exploration ==
Planetary scientist Amanda Zangari calculated that a flyby mission to Varuna could take just over 12 years using a Jupiter gravity assist, based on a launch date of 2035 or 2038. Alternative trajectories using gravity assists from Jupiter, Saturn, or Uranus have been also considered. A trajectory using gravity assists from Jupiter and Uranus could take just over 13 years, based on a launch date of 2034 or 2037, whereas a trajectory using gravity assists from Saturn and Uranus could take under 18 years, based on an earlier launch date of 2025 or 2029. Varuna would be approximately 45 AU from the Sun when the spacecraft arrives before 2050, regardless of the trajectories used.
