= Robert S. McMillan (astronomer) =

American astronomer

Robert S. Mcmillan
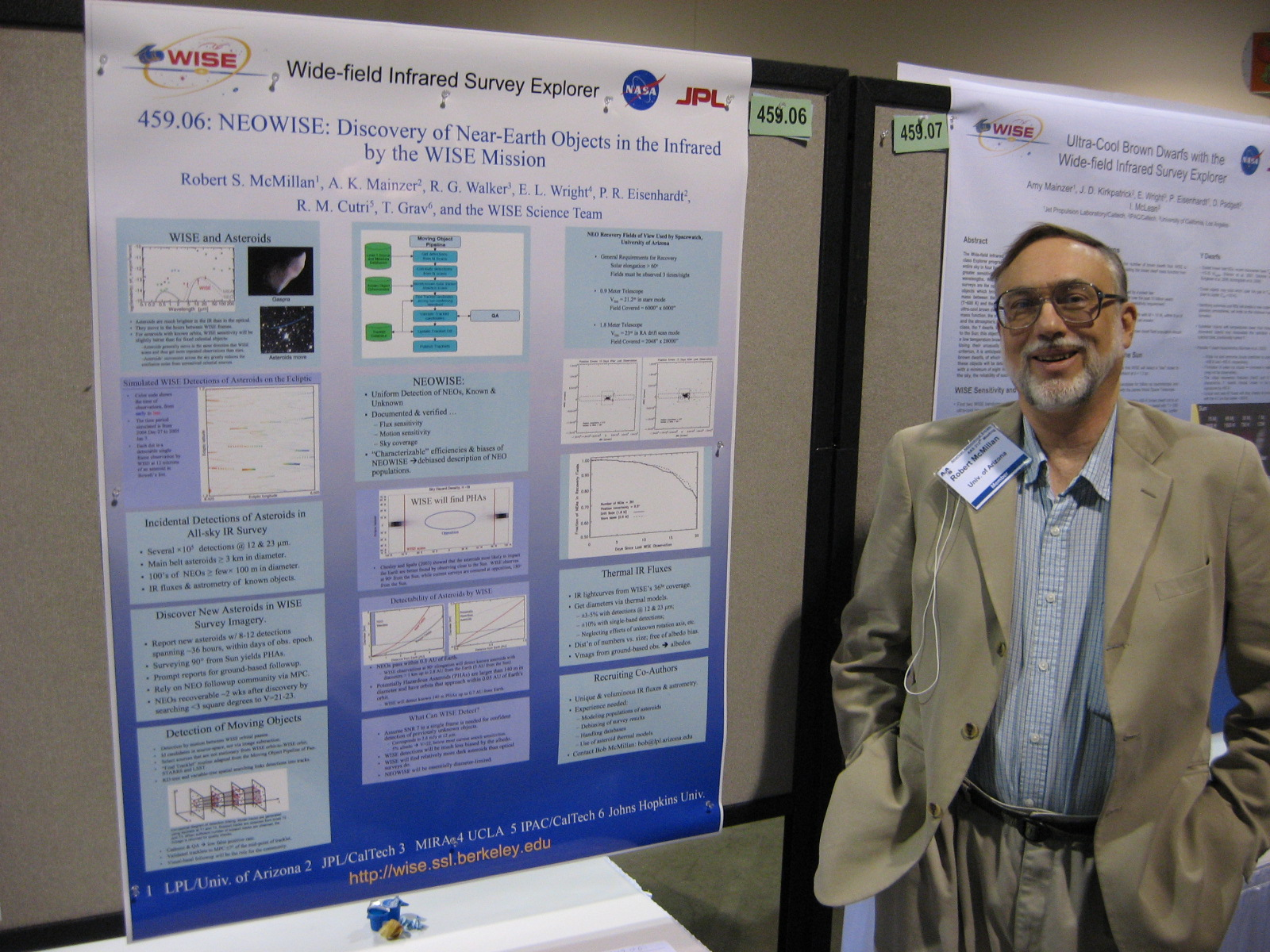
- McMillan in January 2009
- Education: Case Institute of Technology; University of Texas at Austin
- Known for: Discovery of 20000 Varuna, 208P/McMillan
- Scientific career
- Fields: Astronomy, physics
- Workplaces: Lunar and Planetary Laboratory; University of Arizona
- Thesis: New Constraints on the Composition of Interstellar Grains from Observations of Extinction and Polarization (1977)

Robert Scott McMillan is an American astronomer and retired research professor affiliated with the Lunar and Planetary Laboratory (LPL) at the University of Arizona.

He is known for his work in studying minor planets, stellar radial velocities, and astronomical instrumentation.

McMillan served as the Principal Investigator of the Spacewatch Project, a program dedicated to surveying and tracking small bodies in the solar system. He has made various discoveries, including notably 20000 Varuna. On October 19, 2008, he discovered a short-periodic comet 208P/McMillan.

== Education and career ==
McMillan earned a Bachelor of Science degree in Astronomy with High Honors from the Case Institute of Technology in June 1972.

His senior thesis, titled Absolute Magnitudes Determined from the Catalogue of Bright Stars, marked the beginning of his scholarly engagement with stellar properties.

He continued his academic career at the University of Texas at Austin, where he received a Master of Arts degree in Astronomy in 1974. His master's thesis, Intracluster Dust and the Wavelength Dependence of Interstellar Polarization, focused on the physical properties of cosmic dust within galaxy clusters. McMillan completed his Ph.D. in Astronomy at the University of Texas in December 1977.

His doctoral dissertation, New Constraints on the Composition of Interstellar Grains from Observations of Extinction and Polarization, provided important insights into the nature and behavior of interstellar dust.

McMillan has served as a Co-Investigator on NASA’s Wide-field Infrared Survey Explorer (WISE) and its extended mission, NEOWISE, both of which have played critical roles in surveying the sky in infrared wavelengths and detecting near-Earth objects.

His work has contributed to improving the understanding of asteroids, comets, and other small bodies in the solar system.

He served on NASA’s Task Force for the Scientific Use of the Space Station from 1984 to 1986, and was involved in a proposal effort for an orbiting Astrometric Imaging Telescope aimed at detecting extrasolar planets, a project that spanned from 1984 to 1992.

He has been a member of the American Astronomical Society (AAS) since 1971, and is affiliated with its Division for Planetary Sciences (DPS). McMillan has also been a member of the International Astronomical Union (IAU) since 1988, and the International Society for Optics and Photonics (SPIE) since 1984.

After four decades of service, McMillan officially retired from the University of Arizona on June 30, 2019. He remains involved with the Spacewatch Project and participates in observational work.

=== Stellar and Planetary Astronomy ===
At the Lunar and Planetary Laboratory, McMillan contributed to developing techniques for measuring stellar radial velocities with high precision.

His group was the first to publish stellar Doppler shift measurements with a precision better than ±20 meters per second in a refereed journal.

In 2007, McMillan collaborated on a project that utilized a prototype dispersed Fourier Transform Spectrometer with the 2.3-meter Bok Telescope to measure radial velocities of binary stars.

=== Spacewatch Project ===
McMillan joined the Spacewatch Project in 1980 as Co-Investigator and Project Scientist under founder Tom Gehrels.

He played a role in adapting charge-coupled device (CCD) technology for use in asteroid and comet surveys. McMillan became Principal Investigator of the project in 1997. Under his leadership, the project completed significant instrumentation upgrades, including constructing a 1.8-meter telescope (completed in 2002) and automating and re-equipping the 0.9-meter telescope (rebuilt and automated by 2006). A new imaging system added to the 1.8-meter telescope 2011 increased the observation rate and improved measurement precision.

=== Discoveries ===
McMillan has made several discoveries of minor bodies in the solar system. He discovered Trans-Neptunian Object (20000) Varuna in 2000 and the near-Earth asteroid 2005 YU55 in December 2005. The latter made a close approach to Earth in November 2011.

He was also part of the team that recovered asteroid 719 Albert, a long-lost object first observed in 1911. In 2000, through orbital calculations by Gareth V. Williams of the Minor Planet Center, the asteroid was confirmed as Albert.

In 2008, McMillan discovered comet 208P/McMillan, a short-period comet with an orbital period of 8.1 years. The asteroid 2289 McMillan, discovered in 1960 by Cornelis Johannes van Houten, is named in his honor.

== Selected publications ==
- Lockwood, G. W.; McMillan, R. S. (1974). "Near-infrared photometry of unidentified IRC stars. II". The Astrophysical Journal. 192: 113. Bibcode:1974ApJ...192..113L. doi:10.1086/153041. ISSN 0004-637X.
- McCuskey, S. W.; McMillan, R. S. (1973). "Mean absolute magnitudes and dispersions for selected spectral groups". The Astronomical Journal. 78: 73. Bibcode:1973AJ.....78...73M. doi:10.1086/111375. ISSN 0004-6256.
- McMillan, R. S.; Breger, M.; Ferland, G. J.; Loumos, G. L. (August 1976). "A survey for small-amplitude variability among population II stars". Publications of the Astronomical Society of the Pacific. 88: 495. Bibcode:1976PASP...88..495M. doi:10.1086/129975. ISSN 0004-6280.
- McMillan, R. S. (1976). "Interstellar polarization in front of the young cluster NGC 7380". The Astronomical Journal. 81: 970. Bibcode:1976AJ.....81..970M. doi:10.1086/111977. ISSN 0004-6256.
- McMillan, R. S.; Tapia, S. (1977). "The wavelength dependence of polarization in the Cygnus OB2 association - A new determination of interstellar birefringence". The Astrophysical Journal. 212: 714. Bibcode:1977ApJ...212..714M. doi:10.1086/155096. ISSN 0004-637X.
- McMillan, R. S. (1977). "Walker No. 67 in NGC 2264 - A candidate for strong interstellar circular polarization". The Astrophysical Journal. 216: L41. Bibcode:1977ApJ...216L..41M. doi:10.1086/182505. ISSN 0004-637X.
- Smith, P. H.; McMillan, R. S. (1988). "Short Period Oscillations in Acturus, Aldebaran, and Pollux". The Impact of Very High S/N Spectroscopy on Stellar Physics. 132: 291. Bibcode:1988IAUS..132..291S. ISSN 1743-9221.
- McMillan, Robert S.; Smith, Peter H.; Perry, Marcus L.; Moore, T. L.; Merline, William J. (1990-07-01). "Long-term stability of a Fabry-Perot interferometer used for measurement of stellar Doppler shift". In Crawford, David L. (ed.). Instrumentation in Astronomy VII. Vol. 1235. SPIE. p. 601. doi:10.1117/12.19123.
- McMillan, R. S.; Smith, P. H.; Moore, T. L.; Perry, M. L. (1992). "Variation of the radial velocity of Epsilon Cygni A". Publications of the Astronomical Society of the Pacific. 104: 1173. Bibcode:1992PASP..104.1173M. doi:10.1086/133105. ISSN 0004-6280.
- Larsen, J. A.; McMillan, R. S.; Scotti, J. V.; Hicks, M.; Fevig, R.; Williams, G. V. (May 2000). "(719) Albert = 2000 JW8". International Astronomical Union Circular (7420): 1. Bibcode:2000IAUC.7420....1L. ISSN 0081-0304.

== See also ==
- Near-Earth Object Camera
- Pioneer 11
- Spacewatch
- Wide-field Infrared Survey Explorer
