= São Sebastião do Umbuzeiro =

Town in Paraíba, Brazil

- Municipality
- The Municipality of São Sebastião do Umbuzeiro
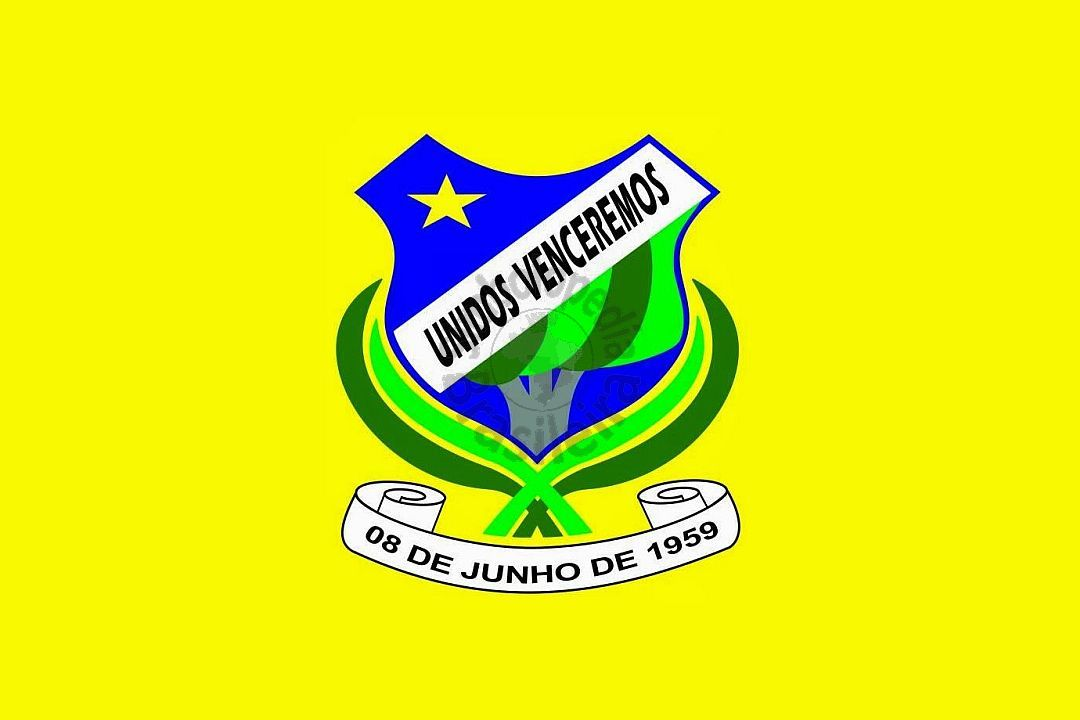
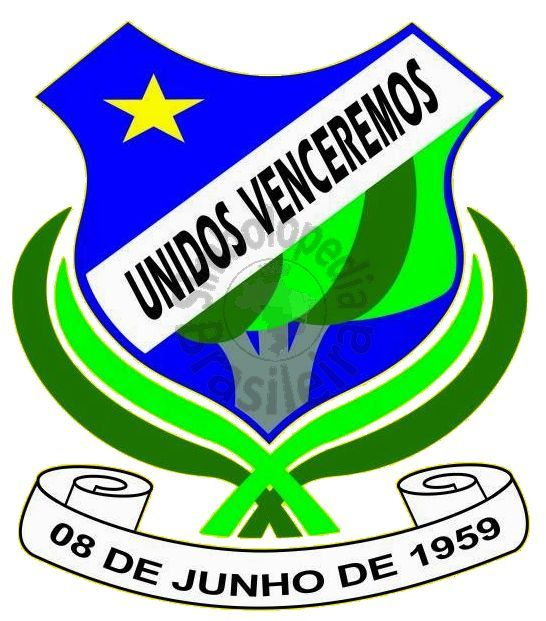
- Flag Coat of arms

- Location of São Sebastião do Umbuzeiro in the State of Paraíba
- Coordinates: 08°09′07″S 37°00′36″W
- Country: Brazil
- Region: Northeast
- State: Paraíba
- Founded: June 8, 1959

Government
  - Mayor: Alexandre Fernandes Batista de Andrade (PMDB)

Area
  - Total: 460.569 km^{2} (177.827 sq mi)

Population (2020)
  - Total: 3,512
  - Density: 6.5/km^{2} (17/sq mi)
- Time zone: UTC−3 (BRT)
- HDI (2000): 0.574 – medium

São Sebastião do Umbuzeiro (Central northeastern portuguese pronunciation: [ˈsɐ̃w sɛbɐʃtjˈɐ̃w du ũbuˈzeɾu]) is the southernmost town in the Brazilian state of Paraíba.
