= São João do Tigre =

Municipality in Paraíba, Brazil

Coordinates: 8°04′S 36°52′W

- Municipality
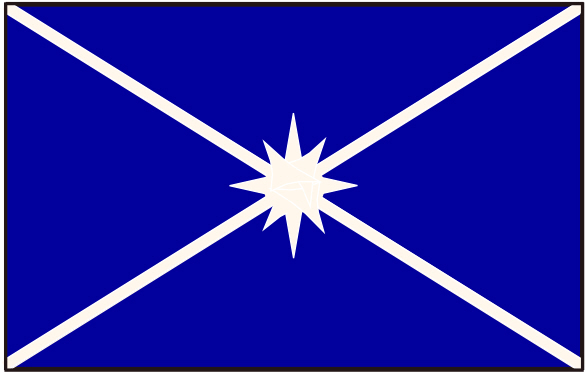
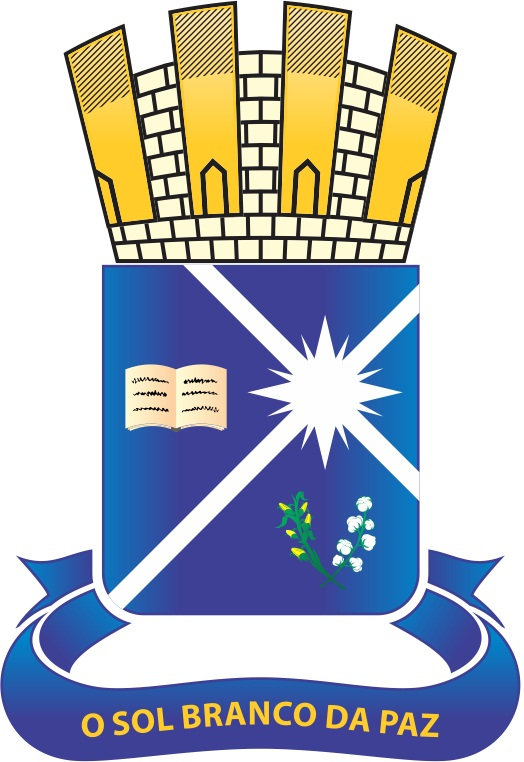
- Flag Coat of arms
- Interactive map of São João do Tigre
- Country: Brazil
- Region: Northeast
- State: Paraíba
- Mesoregion: Boborema

Population (2020)
  - Total: 4,415
- Time zone: UTC−3 (BRT)

São João do Tigre (Central northeastern portuguese pronunciation: [ˈsɐ̃w ˈʒ͡wɐ̃w du ˈtiɡɾi]) is a municipality in the state of Paraíba in the Northeast Region of Brazil.

== See also ==
- List of municipalities in Paraíba
