= Sumé =

Coordinates: 7°39′S 36°55′W

- Municipality
- Flag Coat of arms
- Interactive map of Sumé
- Country: Brazil
- Region: South America
- State: Paraíba
- Mesoregion: Boborema

Population (2020)
  - Total: 17,031
- Time zone: UTC−3 (BRT)

Sumé (Central northeastern portuguese pronunciation: [suˈmɛ]) is a municipality in the state of Paraíba in the Northeast Region of Brazil.

== See also ==
- List of municipalities in Paraíba
